= Danzig Research Society =

Scientific society (1743–1936)

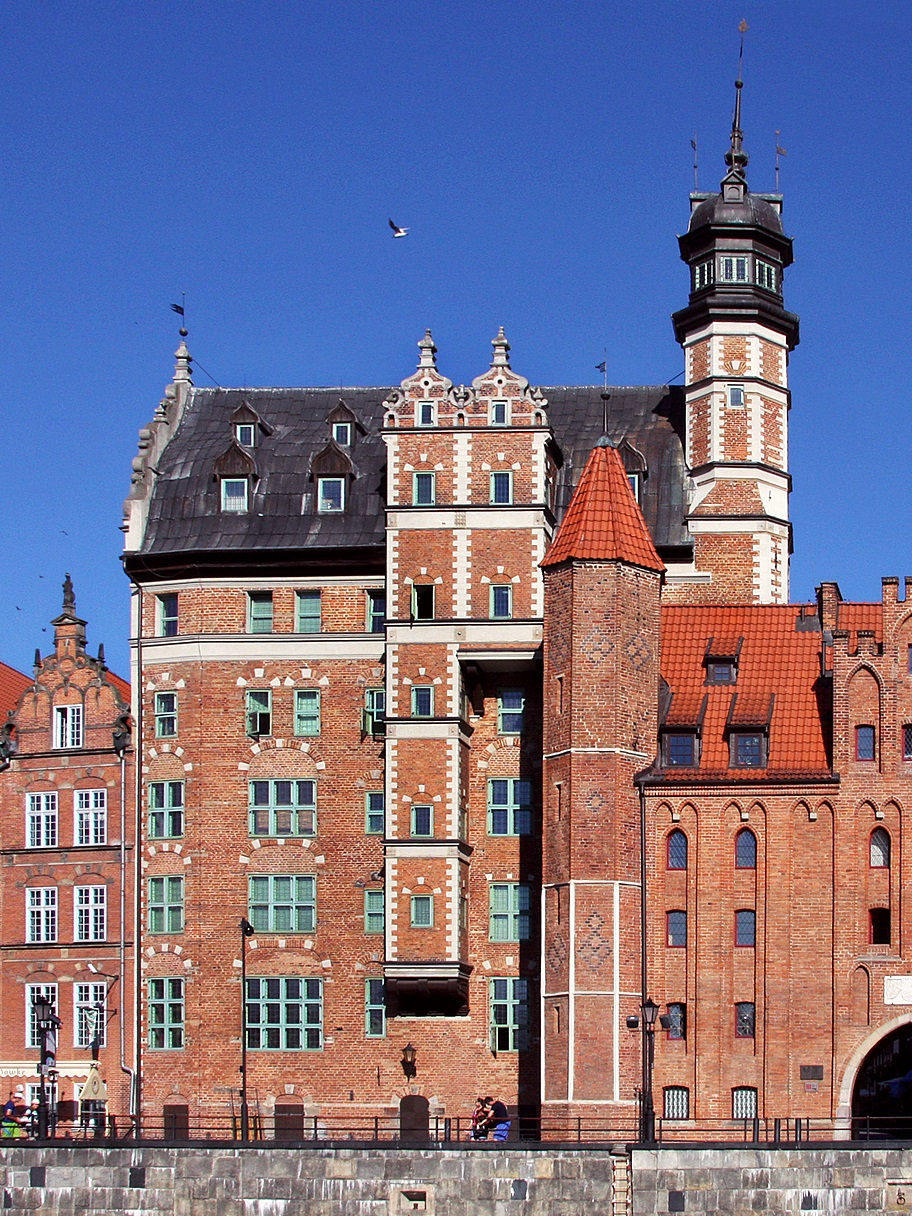
- Seat of the organization in 1846–1936
- Formation: 1743
- Founder: Daniel Gralath
- Dissolved: 1936
- Coordinates: 54.349°N 18.657°E

The Naturforschende Gesellschaft in Danzig (translated Danzig Research Society, Latin: Societas Physicae Experimentalis, Polish: Gdańskie Towarzystwo Przyrodnicze) was a scientific organization, founded in 1743 in Danzig (Gdańsk), Poland, which continued in existence until 1936. The Societas Physicae Experimentalis (Experimental Physics Society) was one of the oldest research societies in the Polish–Lithuanian Commonwealth and in Central and Eastern Europe.

== History ==
Already in 1670, the physician Israel Conradi (1634–1715) had tried to organize a scientific society in the city, without success. Several others tried after him, until Daniel Gralath (1708–1767) finally succeeded. His father-in-law was Jacob Theodor Klein (1685–1759), a city secretary and also a very distinguished scientist, nicknamed Gedanensium Plinius.

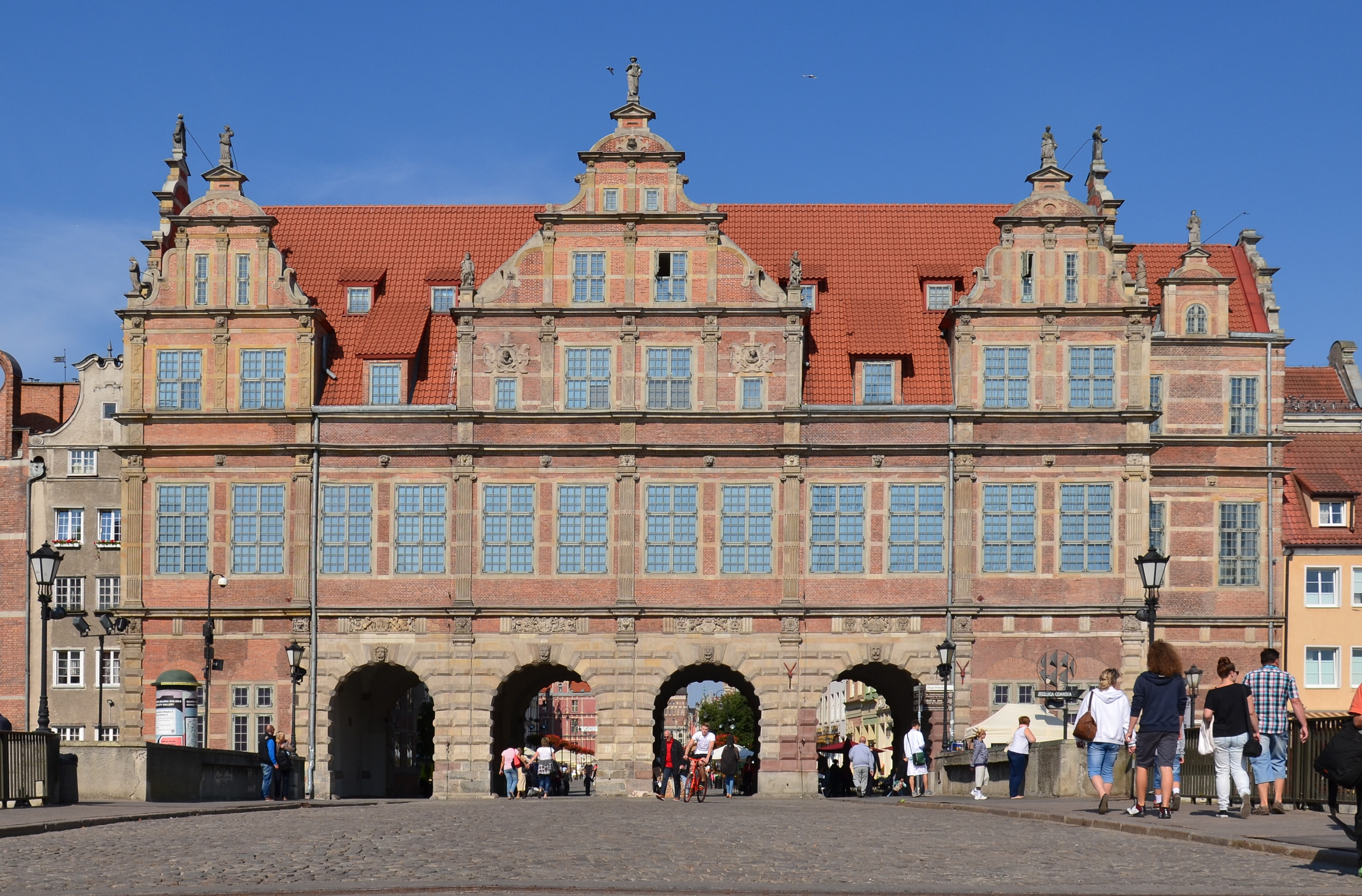
Green Gate, seat of the organization from 1746 to 1846

At the end of 1742, Gralath had gathered a group of learned men for his purpose, an Experimental Physics Society (Societas Physicae Experimentalis), one of the oldest research societies of its type. The first organizing meeting took place on 7 November 1742, the first scientific meeting was called on 2 January 1743. The aim of the Society was to practice and popularize science, among others through weekly public demonstrations of the most interesting experiments in physics. Often the effects of electricity were studied, with the help of the Leyden jar. Since 1746 these took place in the Great Hall of the Green Gate. Gralath also became a councilman and, in 1763, mayor of Danzig. The Society was also supported by Polish King Stanisław August Poniatowski.

Known members were Nathanael Matthaeus von Wolf, Michael Christoph Hanow, Gottfried Lengnich, Johann Jacob Mascov, who wrote the Geschichte der Teutschen, also Daniel Gabriel Fahrenheit and the prince-bishop Adam Stanisław Grabowski.

The sessions of the Society were also attended by many famous persons of the Polish–Lithuanian Commonwealth like Great Lithuanian Hetman Michał Kazimierz "Rybeńko" Radziwiłł, August Fryderyk Moszyński, Joachim Chreptowicz.

After the annexation of the city by Prussia in the Second Partition of Poland and during the Napoleonic Wars, the organization fell into such decline that in 1812 it was proposed to dissolve it, however, several members decided to continue its activity.

In 1840 Alexander von Humboldt accompanied Prussian King Frederick William IV on the way to Königsberg, and Humboldt received an honorary membership in the Society. Later, the society offered Humboldt stipends. The collections of the Society were displayed in the West-Prussian Provincial Museum located at the Green Gate.

In 1845 the society was located in a Renaissance-era building at the Motława, an arm of the Vistula River. The new seat housed research facilities, a small museum and a library, and was decorated with portraits of former prominent members of the organization, as well as a portrait of Nicolaus Copernicus, and a bust of Johannes Hevelius received as a gift from Polish King Stanisław August Poniatowski in the 18th century. In 1866, an astronomical observatory was placed in its tower.

After 200 years of existence, the society ceased to exist in 1936. The building and many priceless valuables were destroyed during the Soviet offensive in 1945, two years after the 200th anniversary.

The building at the Motława river was rebuilt after the war. It houses an Archaeological Museum today.
