= Academic Gymnasium Danzig =

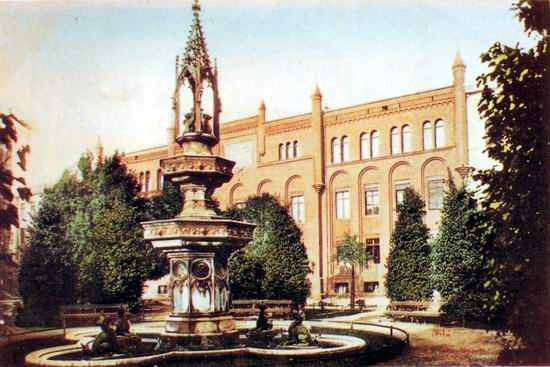
- Academic Gymnasium Danzig (painting by Leopold von Winter)
- Gdańsk; Poland

Information
- Established: 1558
- Campus: Urban

The Academic Gymnasium Danzig (German: Akademisches Gymnasium Danzig, Polish: Gdańskie Gimnazjum Akademickie, Latin: Gymnasium Dantiscanum) was a school founded in Gdańsk, Poland. It was founded in 1558 by Johann Hoppe (1512–1565), who had previously worked at schools in Kulm and Elbing until Catholic Prince-Bishop Stanislaus Hosius closed them. For most of its existence it had a character similar to that of a university.

== History ==
It was in operation as educational gymnasium for Lutheran clergy until 1817. It was one of the most developed educational centers in the Polish–Lithuanian Commonwealth. It also was the site of Collegium Medicum-one of the first associations of doctors in the Polish–Lithuanian Commonwealth.

In the 16th century, as many cities in the Polish province of Royal Prussia became Lutheran, the population began to seek a Lutheran education. The University of Königsberg in neighbouring Ducal Prussia, founded in 1544, was not big enough to educate all the new Protestant clerics and administrators needed for the newly Lutheran state in addition to arrivals from other parts of the Polish–Lithuanian Commonwealth, so local Latin schools in the Commonwealth were upgraded. The future home of the Gymnasium would be the former Franciscan monastery turned into a school. In 1539, a Schola Dantiscana program was started by Andreas Aurifaber. In 1558 Johann Hoppe founded a secular gymnasium that would become the Academic Gymnasium Danzig. Achatius Curaeus (1531–1594), from the University of Wittenberg, was made the first rector, but due to the theological conflicts between Gnesio-Lutherans and Philippists, he soon left.

In 1580, the school received the title Academic Gymnasium. Along with similar schools in Elbląg and Toruń, the gymnasium transformed the province of Royal Prussia into a center of classical studies in the 16th century. The university ambitions of the Gymnasium can be proved by the fact that in 1580-1611 the following chairs were created: theology, philosophy, law and history, rhetoric, mathematics, medicine with anatomy, Greek, Hebrew and oriental languages. In 1589 a Polish language course was created.

In 1817, after the Partitions of Poland, when Gdańsk became part of the Kingdom of Prussia, the municipal gymnasium was founded and named Städtisches Gymnasium Danzig (City High School of Danzig), in contrast to the earlier (royal) Königliches Gymnasium. The Academic Gymnasium Danzig was in operation until March 1945, when Danzig fell to the Red Army. Subsequently, the city as Gdańsk, became again part of Poland.

== Notable people ==
Notable lecturers of the Academic Gymnasium include Bartholomäus Keckermann, Peter Crüger, Krzysztof Celestyn Mrongovius, Jan Schultz-Szulecki, Abraham Calovius, Michael Christoph Hanow (Hanovius), Gottfried Lengnich, Paweł Świetlicki, Joachim Pastorius, Paweł Pater. Among its students and alumni were Johannes Hevelius, Andreas Gryphius, Gottfried Lengnich, Hugo Münsterberg, Daniel Gralath, Zbigniew Gorajski, Christian Hoffmann von Hoffmannswaldau, Paweł Świetlicki, Wawrzyniec Gabler, Márton Szepsi Csombor.

In June 2008, the National Museum in Gdańsk unveiled a memorial table dedicated to Academic Gymnasium to mark the 450th anniversary of its founding.

== Rectors ==
Rectors of Akademic Gymnasium Danzig:

First rector Humanist Achatius Curaeus, advisor Johann Hoppe

- 1580–1629 Jacob Fabritius
- 1602–1609 Bartholomäus Keckermann (co-rector with Fabritius)
- 1631–1643 Johann Botsack
- 1643–1650 Abraham Kalau (Calovius)
- 1651–1669 Johann Maukisch
- 1670–1682 Aegidius Strauch
- 1685–1715 Samuel Schelwig
- 1717– Michael Christoph Hanow (Hanovious)
- 1717–1730 Johann Georg Abicht
- 1732–1752 Albert Menon Verpoorten
- 1753–1769 Ernst August Bertling
- 1770–1794 Wilhelm Paul Verpoorten
- 1799–1809 Daniel Gralath? relative of Daniel Gralath
- 1810–1811 Friedrich Theodor Rinck
- 1812–1813 Nicolaus Gottfried Eckermann
- 1814–1817 Christian Gottfried Ewerbeck

== Literature ==
- L.Mokrzecki: Studium z dziejów nauczania historii. Rozwój dydaktyki przedmiotu w Gdańskim Gimnazjum Akademickim do schyłku XVII, Gdańsk 1973
- Sven Tode: Bildung und Wissenskultur der Geistlichkeit im Danzig der Frühen Neuzeit, in: Bildung und Konfession, hg. v. H.J. Selderhuis/ M. Wriedt, Siebeck Mohr Tübingen 2006, S. 61 ff. ISBN 3-16-148931-4
- Martin Brecht u.a. (Hg.): Geschichte des Pietismus, Bd. I., Göttingen 1993 ISBN 3-525-55343-9
- Siegfried Wollgast: Philosophie in Deutschland zwischen Reformation und Aufklärung 1550-1650, Akademie-Verlag Berlin 1993 ISBN 3-05-002099-7
- 425 Jahre Städtisches Gymnasium Danzig. 1558 - 1983. Gedenkschrift für die Ehemaligen und Freunde der Schule, hg. v. Bernhard Schulz, Gernsbach 1983
- Reinhard Golz, Wolfgang Mayrhofer: Luther and Melanchthon in the Educational Thought of Central and Eastern Europe, 1998, ISBN 3-8258-3490-5 Luther and Melanchthon in the Educational Thought of Central and Eastern Europe
