= History of biology =

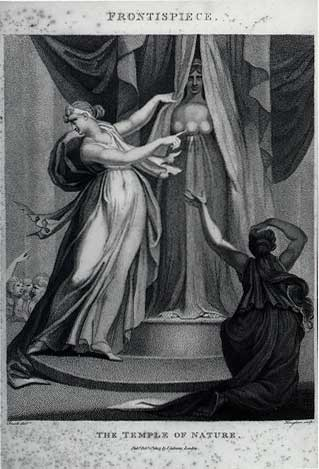
The frontispiece to Erasmus Darwin's The Temple of Nature shows a goddess pulling back the veil from nature (in the person of Artemis). Allegory and metaphor have often played an important role in the history of biology.

The history of biology traces the study of the living world from ancient to modern times. Although the concept of biology as a single coherent field arose in the 19th century, the biological sciences emerged from traditions of medicine and natural history reaching back to Ayurveda, ancient Egyptian medicine and the works of Aristotle, Theophrastus and Galen in the ancient Greco-Roman world. This ancient work was further developed in the Middle Ages by Muslim physicians and scholars such as Avicenna. During the European Renaissance and early modern period, biological thought was revolutionized in Europe by a renewed interest in empiricism and the discovery of many novel organisms. Prominent in this movement were Vesalius and Harvey, who used experimentation and careful observation in physiology, and naturalists such as Linnaeus and Buffon who began to classify the diversity of life and the fossil record, as well as the development and behavior of organisms. Antonie van Leeuwenhoek revealed by means of microscopy the previously unknown world of microorganisms, laying the groundwork for cell theory. The growing importance of natural theology, partly a response to the rise of mechanical philosophy, encouraged the growth of natural history (although it entrenched the argument from design).

Over the 18th and 19th centuries, biological sciences such as botany and zoology became increasingly professional scientific disciplines. Lavoisier and other physical scientists began to connect the animate and inanimate worlds through physics and chemistry. Explorer-naturalists such as Alexander von Humboldt investigated the interaction between organisms and their environment, and the ways this relationship depends on geography—laying the foundations for biogeography, ecology and ethology. Naturalists began to reject essentialism and consider the importance of extinction and the mutability of species. Cell theory provided a new perspective on the fundamental basis of life. These developments, as well as the results from embryology and paleontology, were synthesized in Charles Darwin's theory of evolution by natural selection. The end of the 19th century saw the fall of spontaneous generation and the rise of the germ theory of disease, though the mechanism of inheritance remained a mystery.

In the early 20th century, the rediscovery of Mendel's work in botany by Carl Correns led to the rapid development of genetics applied to fruit flies by Thomas Hunt Morgan and his students, and by the 1930s the combination of population genetics and natural selection in the "neo-Darwinian synthesis". New disciplines developed rapidly, especially after Watson and Crick proposed the structure of DNA. Following the establishment of the Central Dogma and the cracking of the genetic code, biology was largely split between organismal biology—the fields that deal with whole organisms and groups of organisms—and the fields related to cellular and molecular biology. By the late 20th century, new fields like genomics and proteomics were reversing this trend, with organismal biologists using molecular techniques, and molecular and cell biologists investigating the interplay between genes and the environment, as well as the genetics of natural populations of organisms.

== Prehistoric times ==
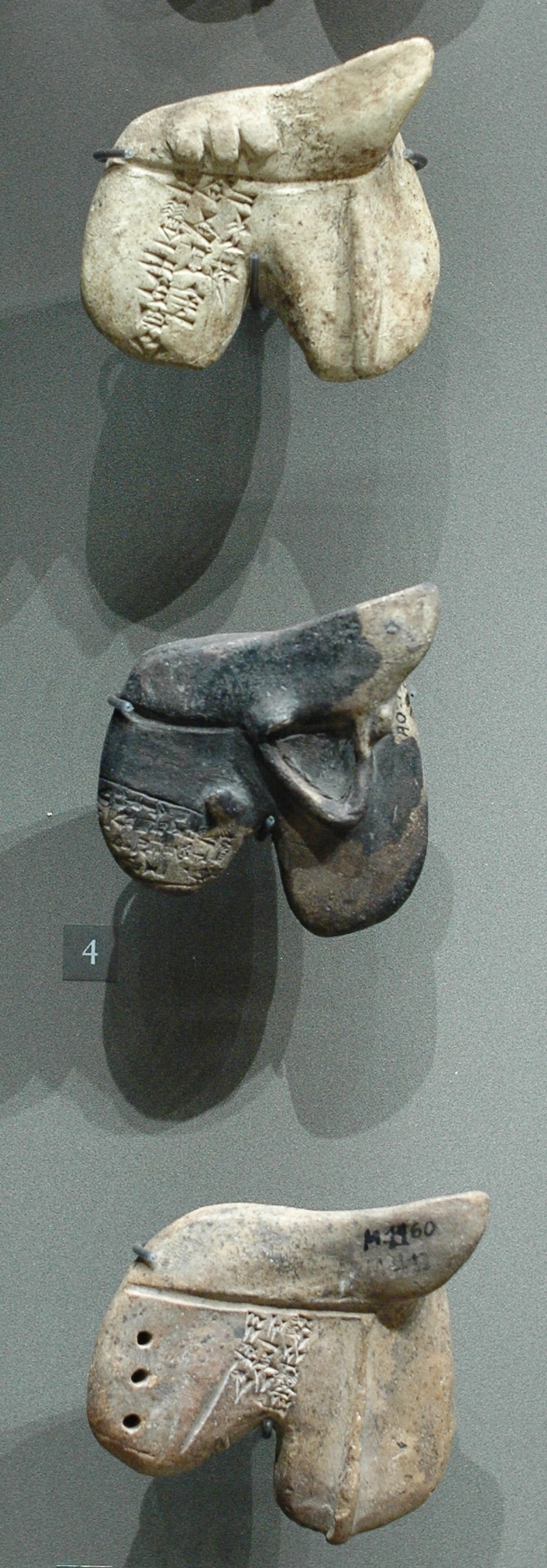
Clay models of animal livers dating between the nineteenth and eighteenth centuries BCE, found in the royal palace at Mari

The earliest humans must have had and passed on knowledge about plants and animals to increase their chances of survival. This may have included knowledge of human and animal anatomy and aspects of animal behavior (such as migration patterns). However, the first major turning point in biological knowledge came with the Neolithic Revolution about 10,000 years ago. Humans first domesticated plants for farming, then livestock animals to accompany the resulting sedentary societies.

== Earliest roots ==
Between around 3000 and 1200 BCE, the Ancient Egyptians and Mesopotamians made contributions to astronomy, mathematics, and medicine, which later entered and shaped Greek natural philosophy of classical antiquity, a period that profoundly influenced the development of what came to be known as biology.

=== Ancient Egypt ===
Over a dozen medical papyri have been preserved, most notably the Edwin Smith Papyrus (the oldest extant surgical handbook) and the Ebers Papyrus (a handbook of preparing and using materia medica for various diseases), both from around 1600 BCE.

Ancient Egypt is also known for developing embalming, which was used for mummification, in order to preserve human remains and forestall decomposition.

=== Mesopotamia ===
The Mesopotamians seem to have had little interest in the natural world as such, preferring to study how the gods had ordered the universe. Animal physiology was studied for divination, including especially the anatomy of the liver, seen as an important organ in haruspicy. Animal behavior too was studied for divinatory purposes. Most information about the training and domestication of animals was probably transmitted orally, but one text dealing with the training of horses has survived.

The ancient Mesopotamians had no distinction between "rational science" and magic. When a person became ill, doctors prescribed both magical formulas to be recited and medicinal treatments. The earliest medical prescriptions appear in Sumerian during the Third Dynasty of Ur (c. 2112 – c. 2004 BCE). The most extensive Babylonian medical text, however, is the Diagnostic Handbook written by the ummânū, or chief scholar, Esagil-kin-apli of Borsippa, during the reign of the Babylonian king Adad-apla-iddina (1069 – 1046 BCE). In East Semitic cultures, the main medicinal authority was an exorcist-healer known as an āšipu. The profession was passed down from father to son and was held in high regard. Of less frequent recourse was the asu, a healer who treated physical symptoms using remedies composed of herbs, animal products, and minerals, as well as potions, enemas, and ointments or poultices. These physicians, who could be either male or female, also dressed wounds, set limbs, and performed simple surgeries. The ancient Mesopotamians also practiced prophylaxis and took measures to prevent the spread of disease.

== Separate developments in China and India ==
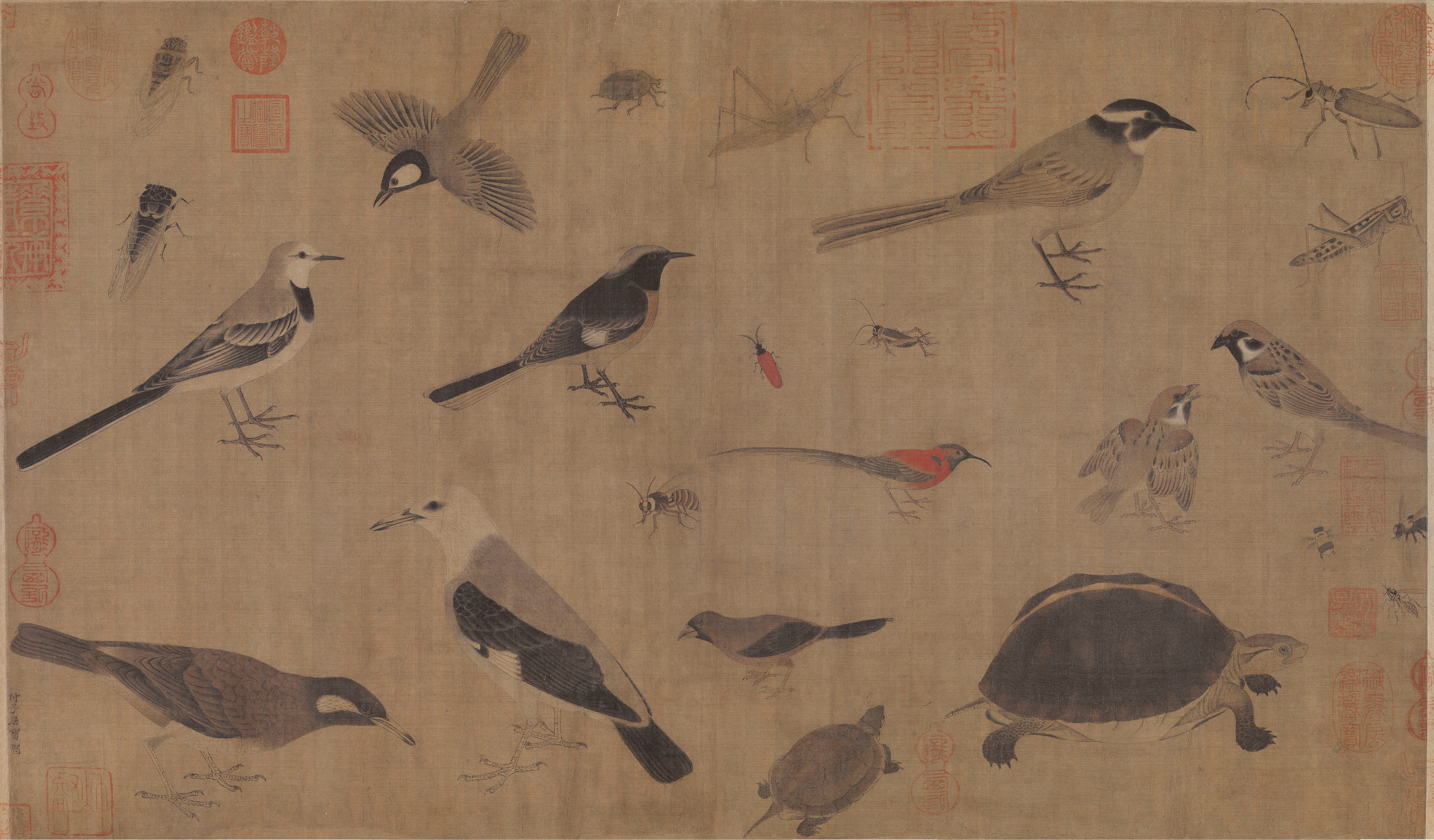
Description of rare animals (写生珍禽图), by Huang Quan (903–965) during the Song dynasty

Observations and theories regarding nature and human health, separate from Western traditions, had emerged independently in other civilizations such as those in China and the Indian subcontinent. In ancient China, earlier conceptions can be found dispersed across several different disciplines, including the work of herbologists, physicians, alchemists, and philosophers. The Taoist tradition of Chinese alchemy, for example, emphasized health (with the ultimate goal being the elixir of life). The system of classical Chinese medicine usually revolved around the theory of yin and yang, and the five phases. Taoist philosophers, such as Zhuangzi in the 4th century BCE, also expressed ideas related to evolution, such as denying the fixity of biological species and speculating that species had developed differing attributes in response to differing environments.

One of the oldest organised systems of medicine is known from ancient India in the form of Ayurveda, which originated around 1500 BCE from Atharvaveda (one of the four most ancient books of Indian knowledge, wisdom and culture).

The ancient Indian Ayurveda tradition independently developed the concept of three humours, resembling that of the four humours of ancient Greek medicine, though the Ayurvedic system included further complications, such as the body being composed of five elements and seven basic tissues. Ayurvedic writers also classified living things into four categories based on the method of birth (from the womb, eggs, heat & moisture, and seeds) and explained the conception of a fetus in detail. They also made considerable advances in the field of surgery, often without the use of human dissection or animal vivisection. One of the earliest Ayurvedic treatises was the Sushruta Samhita, attributed to Sushruta in the 6th century BCE. It was also an early materia medica, describing 700 medicinal plants, 64 preparations from mineral sources, and 57 preparations based on animal sources.

== Classical antiquity ==
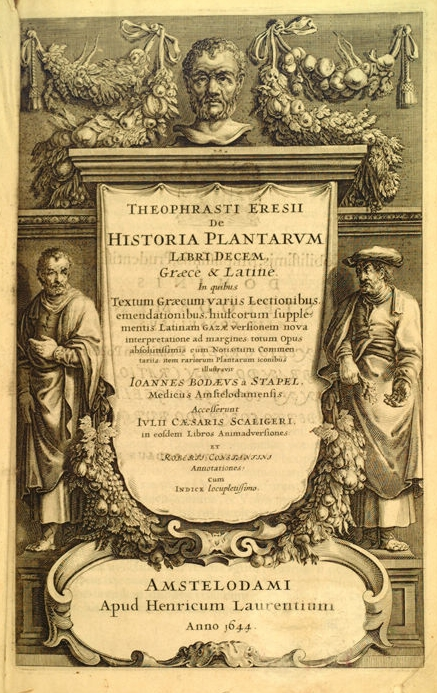
Frontispiece to a 1644 version of the expanded and illustrated edition of Historia Plantarum, originally written by Theophrastus around 300 BCE

The pre-Socratic philosophers asked many questions about life but produced little systematic knowledge of specifically biological interest—though the attempts of the atomists to explain life in purely physical terms would recur periodically through the history of biology. However, the medical theories of Hippocrates and his followers, especially humorism, had a lasting impact.

The philosopher Aristotle was the most influential scholar of the living world from classical antiquity. Though his early work in natural philosophy was speculative, Aristotle's later biological writings were more empirical, focusing on biological causation and the diversity of life. He made countless observations of nature, especially the habits and attributes of plants and animals in the world around him, which he devoted considerable attention to categorizing. In all, Aristotle classified 540 animal species, and dissected at least 50. He believed that intellectual purposes, formal causes, guided all natural processes.

Aristotle's successor at the Lyceum, Theophrastus, wrote a series of books on botany, the History of Plants, which survived as the most important contribution of antiquity to botany, even into the Middle Ages. Many of Theophrastus' names survive into modern times, such as karpós for fruit, and perikárpion for seed vessel. Dioscorides wrote a pioneering and encyclopedic pharmacopoeia, De materia medica, incorporating descriptions of some 600 plants and their uses in medicine. Pliny the Elder, in his Natural History, assembled a similarly encyclopaedic account of things in nature, including accounts of many plants and animals. Aristotle, and nearly all Western scholars after him until the 18th century, believed that creatures were arranged in a graded scale of perfection rising from plants on up to humans: the scala naturae or Great Chain of Being.

A few scholars in the Hellenistic period under the Ptolemies—particularly Herophilus of Chalcedon and Erasistratus of Chios—amended Aristotle's physiological work, even performing dissections and vivisections. Claudius Galen became the most important authority on medicine and anatomy. Though a few ancient atomists such as Lucretius challenged the teleological Aristotelian viewpoint that all aspects of life are the result of design or purpose, teleology (and after the rise of Christianity, natural theology) would remain central to biological thought essentially until the 18th and 19th centuries. Ernst W. Mayr argued that "Nothing of any real consequence happened in biology after Lucretius and Galen until the Renaissance." The ideas of the Greek traditions of natural history and medicine survived, but they were generally taken unquestioningly in medieval Europe.

== Middle Ages ==
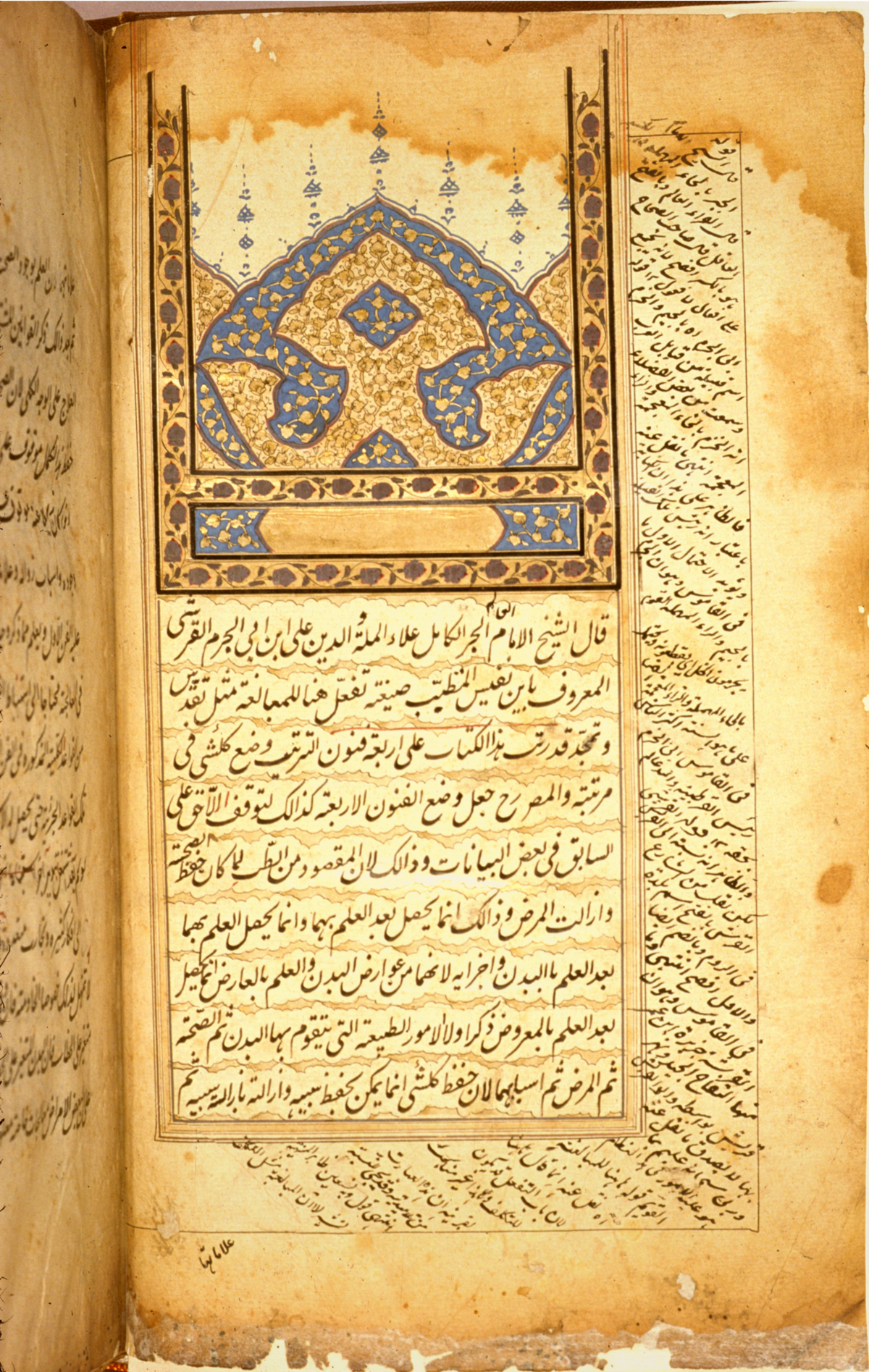
A biomedical work by Ibn al-Nafis, an early adherent of experimental dissection who discovered the pulmonary and coronary circulation

The decline of the Roman Empire led to the disappearance or destruction of much knowledge, though physicians still incorporated many aspects of the Greek tradition into training and practice. In Byzantium and the Islamic world, many of the Greek works were translated into Arabic and many of the works of Aristotle were preserved.

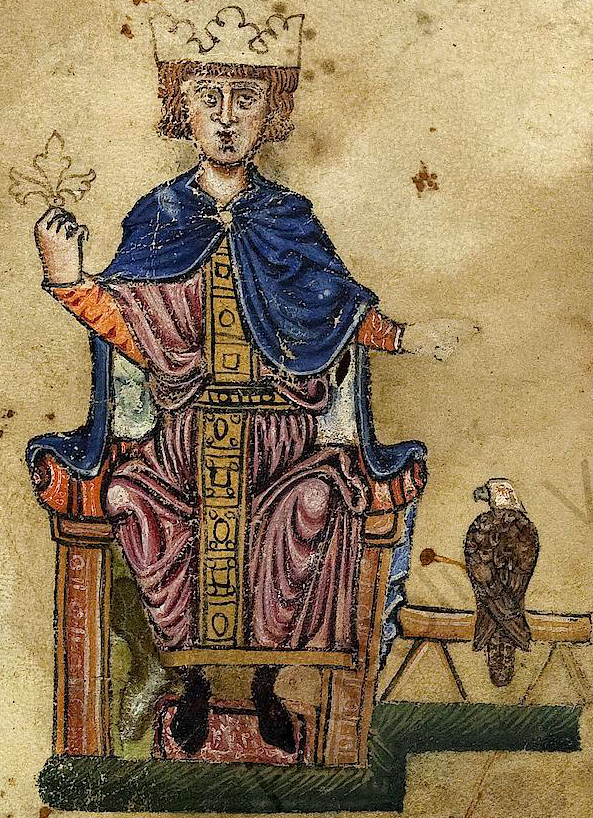
De arte venandi, by Frederick II, Holy Roman Emperor, was an influential medieval natural history text that explored bird morphology.

During the High Middle Ages, a few European scholars such as Hildegard of Bingen, Albertus Magnus and Frederick II wrote on natural history. The rise of European universities, though important for the development of physics and philosophy, had little impact on biological scholarship.

== Renaissance ==
The European Renaissance brought expanded interest in both empirical natural history and physiology. In 1543, Andreas Vesalius inaugurated the modern era of Western medicine with his seminal human anatomy treatise De humani corporis fabrica, which was based on dissection of corpses. Vesalius was the first in a series of anatomists who gradually replaced scholasticism with empiricism in physiology and medicine, relying on first-hand experience rather than authority and abstract reasoning. Via herbalism, medicine was also indirectly the source of renewed empiricism in the study of plants. Otto Brunfels, Hieronymus Bock and Leonhart Fuchs wrote extensively on wild plants, the beginning of a nature-based approach to the full range of plant life. Bestiaries—a genre that combines both the natural and figurative knowledge of animals—also became more sophisticated, especially with the work of William Turner, Pierre Belon, Guillaume Rondelet, Conrad Gessner, and Ulisse Aldrovandi.

Artists such as Albrecht Dürer and Leonardo da Vinci, often working with naturalists, were also interested in the bodies of animals and humans, studying physiology in detail and contributing to the growth of anatomical knowledge. The traditions of alchemy and natural magic, especially in the work of Paracelsus, also laid claim to knowledge of the living world. Alchemists subjected organic matter to chemical analysis and experimented liberally with both biological and mineral pharmacology. This was part of a larger transition in world views (the rise of the mechanical philosophy) that continued into the 17th century, as the traditional metaphor of nature as organism was replaced by the nature as machine metaphor.

== Age of Enlightenment ==
Systematizing, naming and classifying dominated natural history throughout much of the 17th and 18th centuries. Carl Linnaeus published a basic taxonomy for the natural world in 1735 (variations of which have been in use ever since), and in the 1750s introduced scientific names for all his species. While Linnaeus conceived of species as unchanging parts of a designed hierarchy, the other great naturalist of the 18th century, Georges-Louis Leclerc, Comte de Buffon, treated species as artificial categories and living forms as malleable—even suggesting the possibility of common descent. Though he was opposed to evolution, Buffon is a key figure in the history of evolutionary thought; his work would influence the evolutionary theories of both Lamarck and Darwin.

The discovery and description of new species and the collection of specimens became a passion for researchers and explorers, in addition to becoming a lucrative business for entrepreneurs. Many naturalists travelled the globe in search of scientific knowledge and adventure.

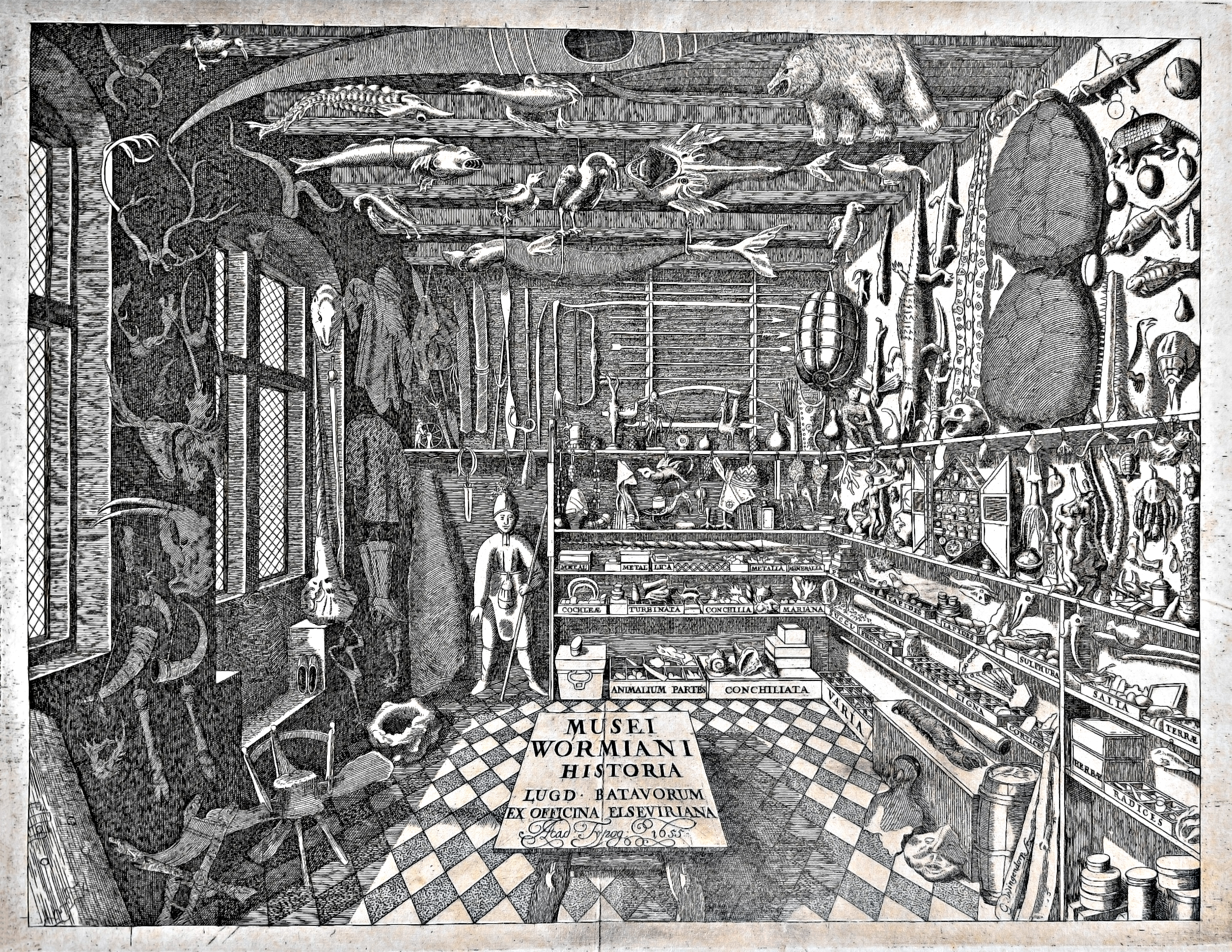
Cabinets of curiosities, such as that of Ole Worm, were centers of biological knowledge in the early modern period, bringing organisms from across the world together in one place. Before the Age of Exploration, naturalists had little idea of the sheer scale of biological diversity.

Extending the work of Vesalius into experiments on still living bodies (of both humans and animals), William Harvey and other natural philosophers investigated the roles of blood, veins and arteries. Harvey's De motu cordis in 1628 was the beginning of the end for Galenic theory, and alongside Santorio Santorio's studies of metabolism, it served as an influential model of quantitative approaches to physiology.

In the early 17th century, the micro-world of biology was just beginning to open up. A few lensmakers and natural philosophers had been creating crude microscopes since the late 16th century, and Robert Hooke published the seminal Micrographia based on observations with his own compound microscope in 1665. But it was not until Antonie van Leeuwenhoek's dramatic improvements in lensmaking beginning in the 1670s—ultimately producing up to 200-fold magnification with a single lens—that scholars discovered spermatozoa, bacteria, infusoria and the sheer strangeness and diversity of microscopic life. Similar investigations by Jan Swammerdam led to a new interest in entomology and built the basic techniques of microscopic dissection and staining.

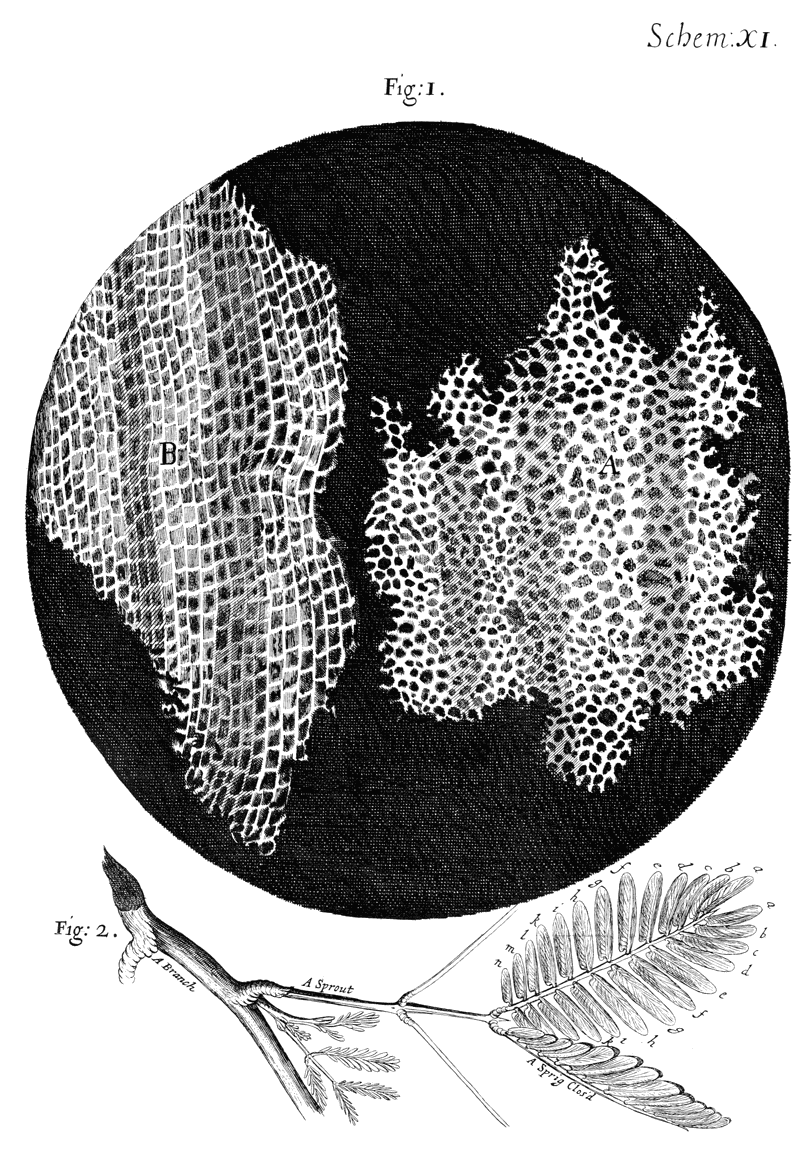
In Micrographia, Robert Hooke had applied the word cell to biological structures such as this piece of cork, but it was not until the 19th century that scientists considered cells the universal basis of life.

As the microscopic world was expanding, the macroscopic world was shrinking. Botanists such as John Ray worked to incorporate the flood of newly discovered organisms shipped from across the globe into a coherent taxonomy, and a coherent theology (natural theology). Debate over another flood, the Noachian, catalyzed the development of paleontology; in 1669 Nicholas Steno published an essay on how the remains of living organisms could be trapped in layers of sediment and mineralized to produce fossils. Although Steno's ideas about fossilization were well known and much debated among natural philosophers, an organic origin for all fossils would not be accepted by all naturalists until the end of the 18th century due to philosophical and theological debate about issues such as the age of the earth and extinction.

== 19th century: the emergence of biological disciplines ==
Up through the 19th century, the scope of biology was largely divided between medicine, which investigated questions of form and function (i.e., physiology), and natural history, which was concerned with the diversity of life and interactions among different forms of life and between life and non-life. By 1900, much of these domains overlapped, while natural history (and its counterpart natural philosophy) had largely given way to more specialized scientific disciplines—cytology, bacteriology, morphology, embryology, geography, and geology.

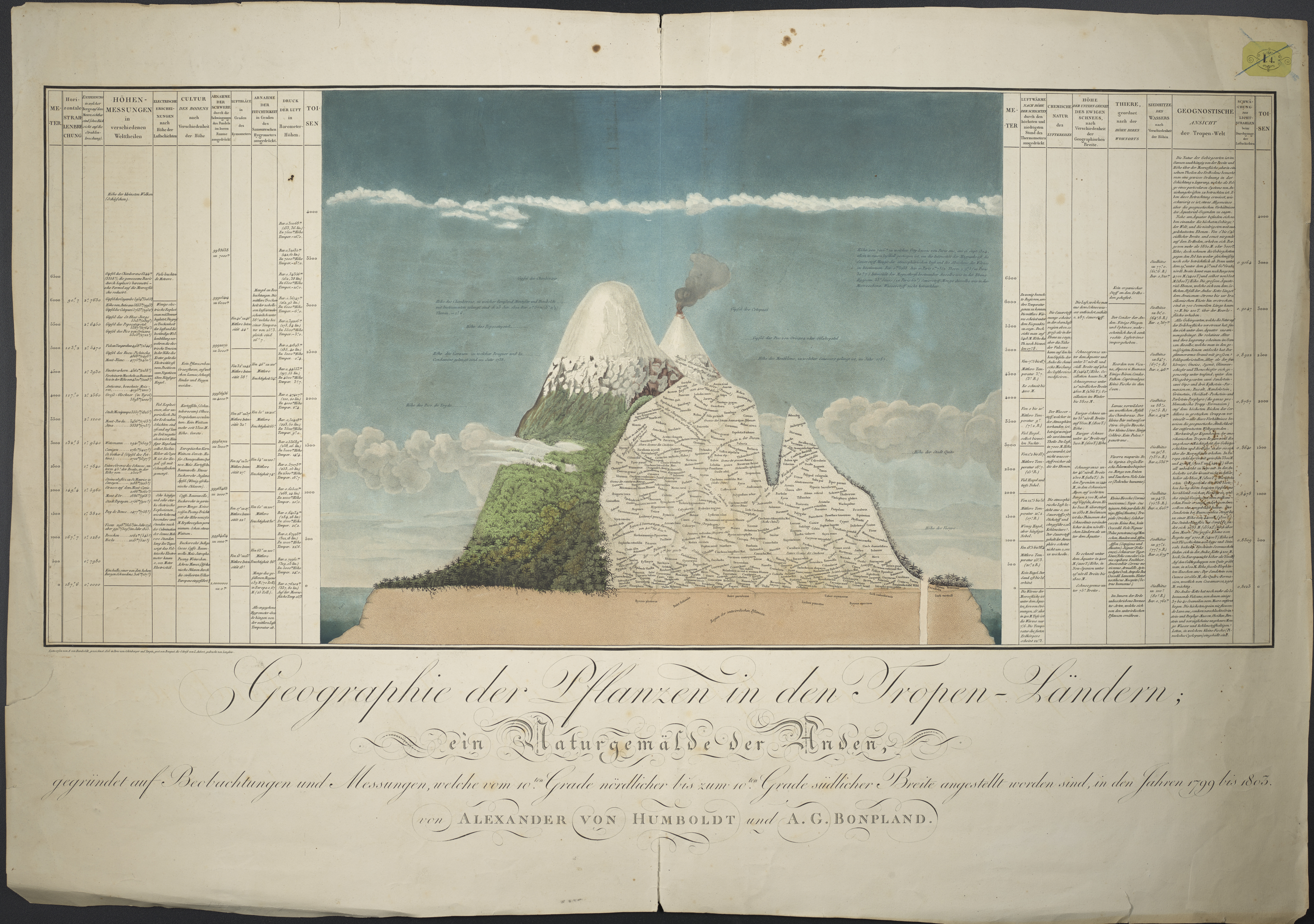
In the course of his travels, Alexander von Humboldt mapped the distribution of plants across landscapes and recorded a variety of physical conditions such as pressure and temperature.

=== Use of the term biology ===
From Greek βίος (bíos) 'life', (from Proto-Indo-European root *gwei-, to live) and λογία (logia) 'study of'. The compound appears in the title of Volume 3 of Michael Christoph Hanow's Philosophiae naturalis sive physicae dogmaticae: Geologia, biologia, phytologia generalis et dendrologia, published in 1766. The term biology in its modern sense appears to have been introduced independently by Thomas Beddoes (in 1799), Karl Friedrich Burdach (in 1800), Gottfried Reinhold Treviranus (Biologie oder Philosophie der lebenden Natur, 1802) and Jean-Baptiste Lamarck (Hydrogéologie, 1802).

Before biology, there were several terms used for the study of animals and plants. Natural history referred to the descriptive aspects of biology, though it also included mineralogy and other non-biological fields; from the Middle Ages through the Renaissance, the unifying framework of natural history was the scala naturae or Great Chain of Being. Natural philosophy and natural theology encompassed the conceptual and metaphysical basis of plant and animal life, dealing with problems of why organisms exist and behave the way they do, though these subjects also included what is now geology, physics, chemistry, and astronomy. Physiology and (botanical) pharmacology were the province of medicine. Botany, Zoology, and (in the case of fossils) Geology replaced natural history and natural philosophy in the 18th and 19th centuries before biology was widely adopted. To this day, "botany" and "zoology" are widely used, although they have been joined by other sub-disciplines of biology.

=== Natural history and natural philosophy ===
Widespread travel by naturalists in the early-to-mid-19th century resulted in a wealth of new information about the diversity and distribution of living organisms. Of particular importance was the work of Alexander von Humboldt, which analyzed the relationship between organisms and their environment (i.e., the domain of natural history) using the quantitative approaches of natural philosophy (i.e., physics and chemistry). Humboldt's work laid the foundations of biogeography and inspired several generations of scientists.

==== Geology and paleontology ====
The emerging discipline of geology also brought natural history and natural philosophy closer together; the establishment of the stratigraphic column linked the spatial distribution of organisms to their temporal distribution, a key precursor to concepts of evolution. Georges Cuvier and others made great strides in comparative anatomy and paleontology in the late 1790s and early 19th century. In a series of lectures and papers that made detailed comparisons between living mammals and fossil remains Cuvier was able to establish that the fossils were remains of species that had become extinct—rather than being remains of species still alive elsewhere in the world, as had been widely believed. Fossils discovered and described by Gideon Mantell, William Buckland, Mary Anning, and Richard Owen among others helped establish that there had been an 'age of reptiles' that had preceded even the prehistoric mammals. These discoveries captured the public imagination and focused attention on the history of life on earth. Most of these geologists held to catastrophism, but Charles Lyell's influential Principles of Geology (1830) popularised Hutton's uniformitarianism, a theory that explained the geological past and present on equal terms.

==== Evolution and biogeography ====
The most significant evolutionary theory before Darwin's was that of Jean-Baptiste Lamarck; based on the inheritance of acquired characteristics (an inheritance mechanism that was widely accepted until the 20th century), it described a chain of development stretching from the lowliest microbe to humans. The British naturalist Charles Darwin, combining the biogeographical approach of Humboldt, the uniformitarian geology of Lyell, Thomas Malthus's writings on population growth, and his own morphological expertise, created a more successful evolutionary theory based on natural selection; similar evidence led Alfred Russel Wallace to independently reach the same conclusions.

The 1859 publication of Darwin's theory in On the Origin of Species by Means of Natural Selection, or the Preservation of Favoured Races in the Struggle for Life is often considered the central event in the history of modern biology. Darwin's established credibility as a naturalist, the sober tone of the work, and most of all the sheer strength and volume of evidence presented, allowed Origin to succeed where previous evolutionary works such as the anonymous Vestiges of Creation had failed. Most scientists were convinced of evolution and common descent by the end of the 19th century. However, natural selection would not be accepted as the primary mechanism of evolution until well into the 20th century, as most contemporary theories of heredity seemed incompatible with the inheritance of random variation.

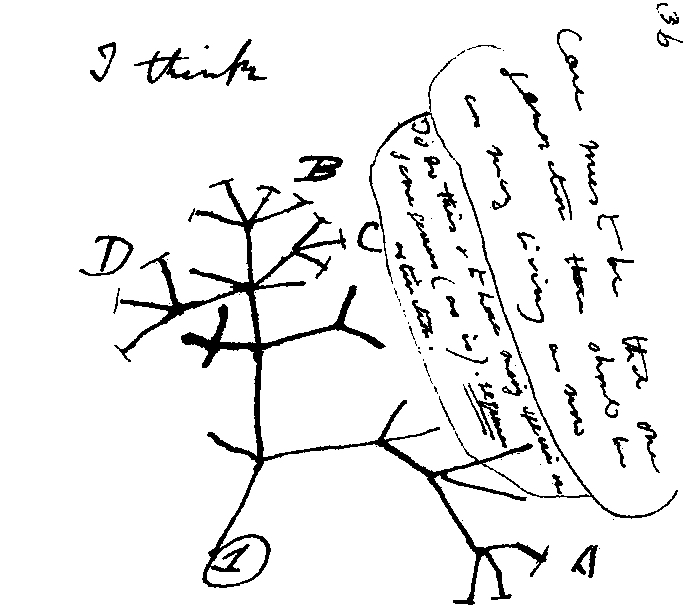
Charles Darwin's first sketch of an evolutionary tree from his First Notebook on Transmutation of Species (1837)

Wallace, following on earlier work by de Candolle, Humboldt and Darwin, made major contributions to zoogeography. Because of his interest in the transmutation hypothesis, he paid particular attention to the geographical distribution of closely allied species during his field work first in South America and then in the Malay Archipelago. While in the archipelago he identified the Wallace line, which runs through the Spice Islands dividing the fauna of the archipelago between an Asian zone and a New Guinea/Australian zone. His key question, as to why the fauna of islands with such similar climates should be so different, could only be answered by considering their origin. In 1876 he wrote The Geographical Distribution of Animals, which was the standard reference work for over half a century, and a sequel, Island Life, in 1880 that focused on island biogeography. He extended the six-zone system developed by Philip Sclater for describing the geographical distribution of birds to animals of all kinds. His method of tabulating data on animal groups in geographic zones highlighted the discontinuities; and his appreciation of evolution allowed him to propose rational explanations, which had not been done before.

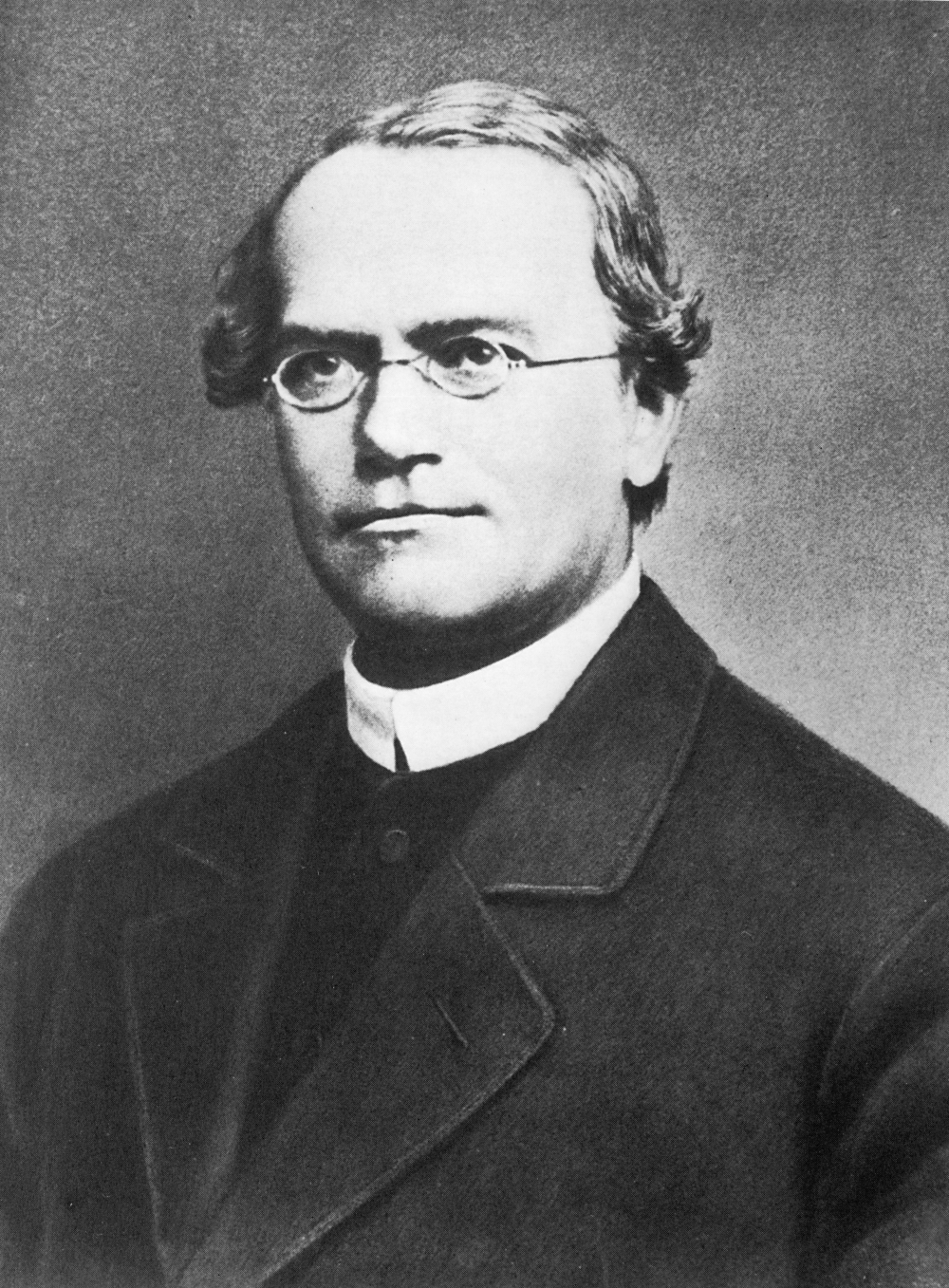
Gregor Mendel, "father of modern genetics"

The scientific study of heredity grew rapidly in the wake of Darwin's Origin of Species with the work of Francis Galton and the biometricians. The origin of genetics is usually traced to the 1866 work of the monk Gregor Mendel, who would later be credited with the laws of inheritance. However, his work was not recognized as significant until 35 years afterward. In the meantime, a variety of theories of inheritance (based on pangenesis, orthogenesis, or other mechanisms) were debated and investigated vigorously. Embryology and ecology also became central biological fields, especially as linked to evolution and popularized in the work of Ernst Haeckel. Most of the 19th century work on heredity, however, was not in the realm of natural history, but that of experimental physiology.

=== Physiology ===
Over the course of the 19th century, the scope of physiology expanded greatly, from a primarily medically oriented field to a wide-ranging investigation of the physical and chemical processes of life—including plants, animals, and even microorganisms in addition to man. Living things as machines became a dominant metaphor in biological (and social) thinking.

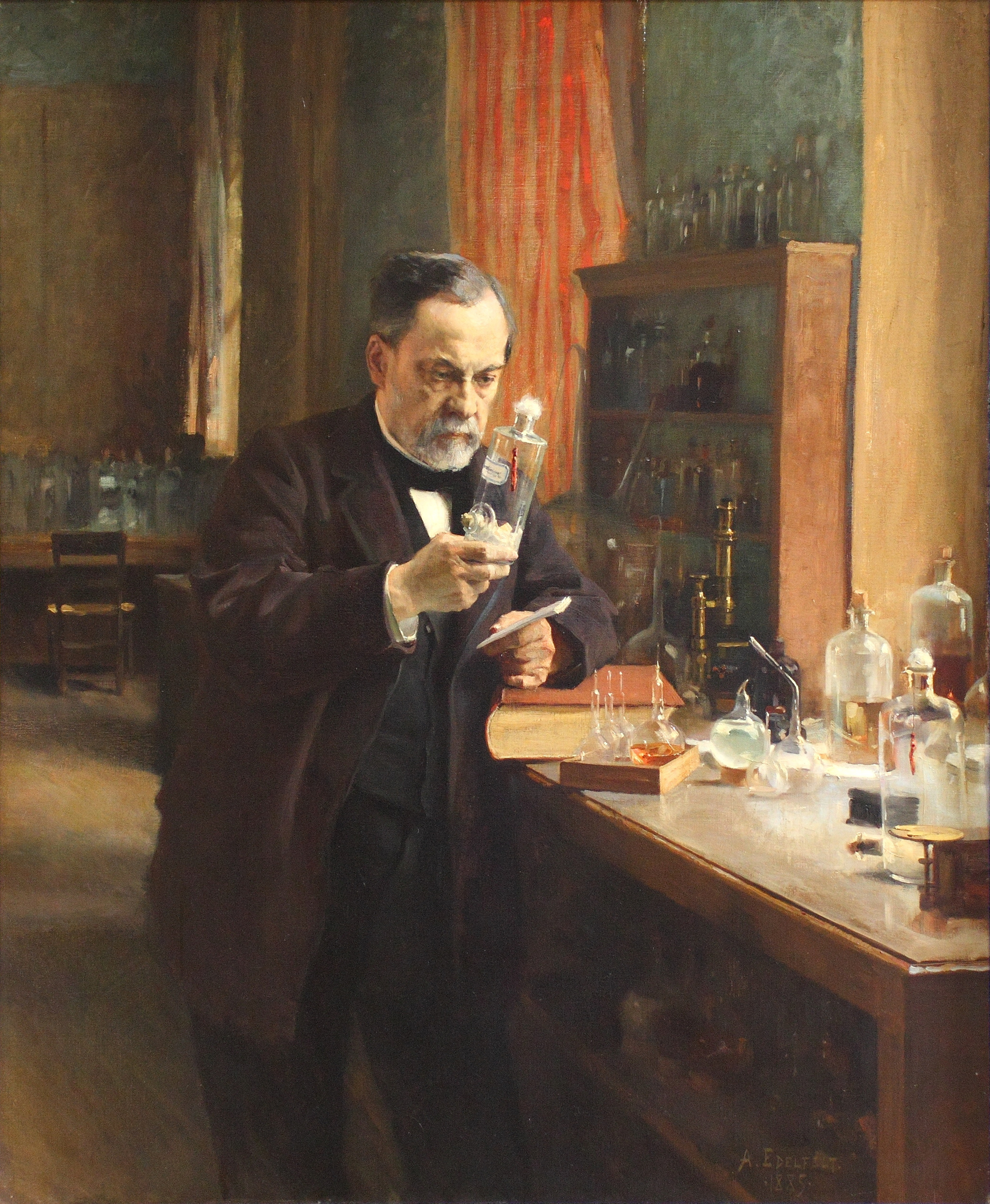
Innovative laboratory glassware and experimental methods developed by Louis Pasteur and other biologists contributed to the young field of bacteriology in the late 19th century.

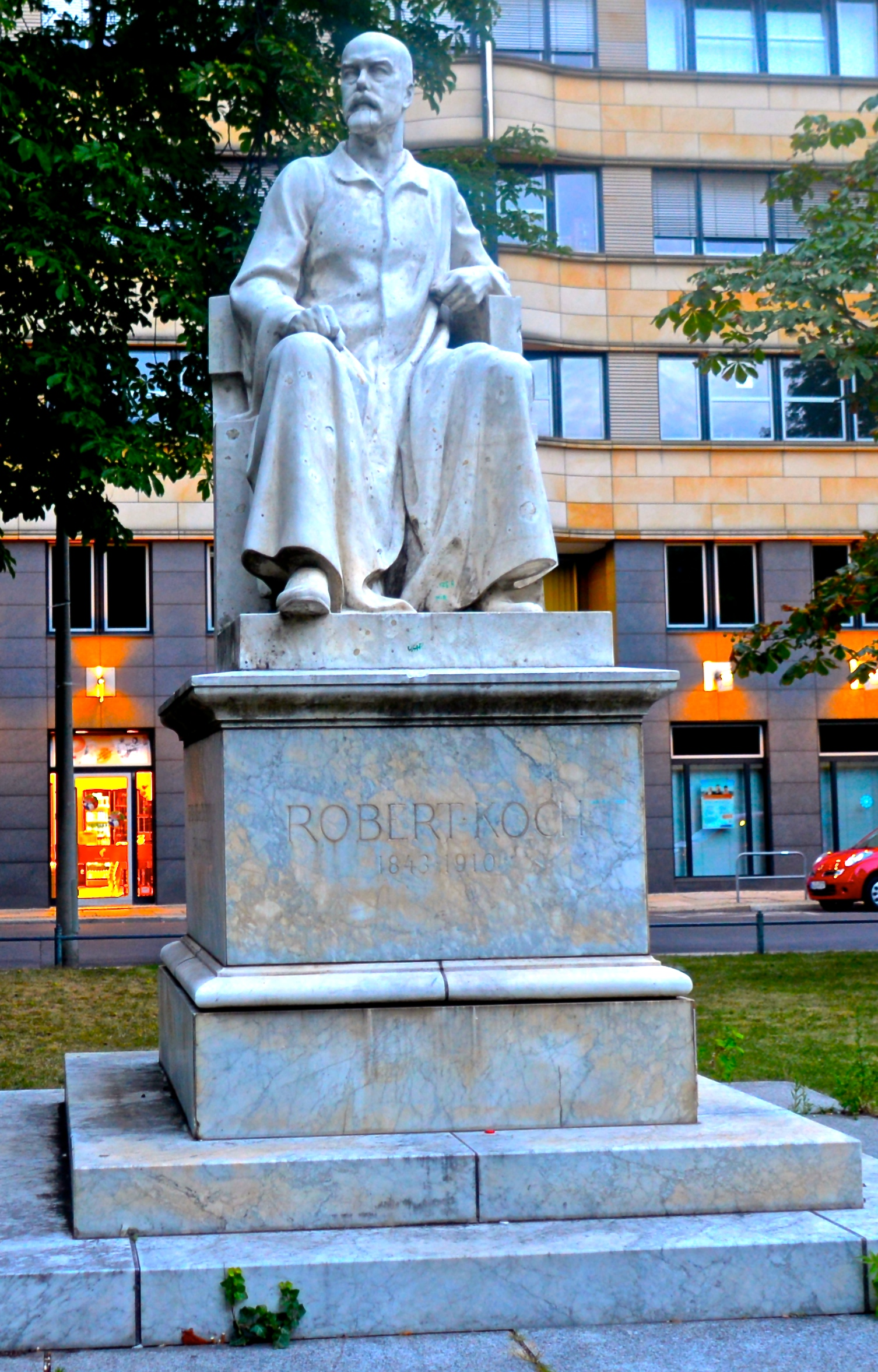
Statue of Robert Koch in Berlin. Koch directly provided proof for the germ theory of diseases, therefore creating the scientific basis of public health, saving millions of lives. For his life's work Koch is seen as one of the founders of modern medicine.

==== Cell theory, embryology and germ theory ====
Advances in microscopy also had a profound impact on biological thinking. In the early 19th century, a number of biologists pointed to the central importance of the cell. In 1838 and 1839, Schleiden and Schwann began promoting the ideas that (1) the basic unit of organisms is the cell and (2) that individual cells have all the characteristics of life, though they opposed the idea that (3) all cells come from the division of other cells. Thanks to the work of Robert Remak and Rudolf Virchow, however, by the 1860s most biologists accepted all three tenets of what came to be known as cell theory.

Cell theory led biologists to re-envision individual organisms as interdependent assemblages of individual cells. Scientists in the rising field of cytology, armed with increasingly powerful microscopes and new staining methods, soon found that even single cells were far more complex than the homogeneous fluid-filled chambers described by earlier microscopists. Robert Brown had described the nucleus in 1831, and by the end of the 19th century cytologists identified many of the key cell components: chromosomes, centrosomes, mitochondria, chloroplasts, and other structures made visible through staining. Between 1874 and 1884 Walther Flemming described the discrete stages of mitosis, showing that they were not artifacts of staining but occurred in living cells, and moreover, that chromosomes doubled in number just before the cell divided and a daughter cell was produced. Much of the research on cell reproduction came together in August Weismann's theory of heredity: he identified the nucleus (in particular chromosomes) as the hereditary material, proposed the distinction between somatic cells and germ cells (arguing that chromosome number must be halved for germ cells, a precursor to the concept of meiosis), and adopted Hugo de Vries's theory of pangenes. Weismannism was extremely influential, especially in the new field of experimental embryology.

By the mid-1850s the miasma theory of disease was largely superseded by the germ theory of disease, creating extensive interest in microorganisms and their interactions with other forms of life. By the 1880s, bacteriology was becoming a coherent discipline, especially through the work of Robert Koch, who introduced methods for growing pure cultures on agar gels containing specific nutrients in Petri dishes. The long-held idea that living organisms could easily originate from nonliving matter (spontaneous generation) was attacked in a series of experiments carried out by Louis Pasteur, while debates over vitalism vs. mechanism (a perennial issue since the time of Aristotle and the Greek atomists) continued apace.

==== Rise of organic chemistry and experimental physiology ====
In chemistry, one central issue was the distinction between organic and inorganic substances, especially in the context of organic transformations such as fermentation and putrefaction. Since Aristotle these had been considered essentially biological (vital) processes. However, Friedrich Wöhler, Justus Liebig and other pioneers of the rising field of organic chemistry—building on the work of Lavoisier—showed that the organic world could often be analyzed by physical and chemical methods. In 1828 Wöhler showed that the organic substance urea could be created by chemical means that do not involve life, providing a powerful challenge to vitalism. Cell extracts ("ferments") that could effect chemical transformations were discovered, beginning with diastase in 1833. By the end of the 19th century the concept of enzymes was well established, though equations of chemical kinetics would not be applied to enzymatic reactions until the early 20th century.

Physiologists such as Claude Bernard explored (through vivisection and other experimental methods) the chemical and physical functions of living bodies to an unprecedented degree, laying the groundwork for endocrinology (a field that developed quickly after the discovery of the first hormone, secretin, in 1902), biomechanics, and the study of nutrition and digestion. The importance and diversity of experimental physiology methods, within both medicine and biology, grew dramatically over the second half of the 19th century. The control and manipulation of life processes became a central concern, and experiment was placed at the center of biological education.

== Twentieth century biological sciences ==
Embryonic development of a salamander, filmed in the 1920s

At the beginning of the 20th century, biological research was largely a professional endeavour. Most work was still done in the natural history mode, which emphasized morphological and phylogenetic analysis over experiment-based causal explanations. However, anti-vitalist experimental physiologists and embryologists, especially in Europe, were increasingly influential. The tremendous success of experimental approaches to development, heredity, and metabolism in the 1900s and 1910s demonstrated the power of experimentation in biology. In the following decades, experimental work replaced natural history as the dominant mode of research.

=== Ecology and environmental science ===
In the early 20th century, naturalists were faced with increasing pressure to add rigor and preferably experimentation to their methods, as the newly prominent laboratory-based biological disciplines had done. Ecology had emerged as a combination of biogeography with the biogeochemical cycle concept pioneered by chemists; field biologists developed quantitative methods such as the quadrat and adapted laboratory instruments and cameras for the field to further set their work apart from traditional natural history. Zoologists and botanists did what they could to mitigate the unpredictability of the living world, performing laboratory experiments and studying semi-controlled natural environments such as gardens; new institutions like the Carnegie Station for Experimental Evolution and the Marine Biological Laboratory provided more controlled environments for studying organisms through their entire life cycles.

The ecological succession concept, pioneered in the 1900s and 1910s by Henry Chandler Cowles and Frederic Clements, was important in early plant ecology. Alfred Lotka's predator-prey equations, G. Evelyn Hutchinson's studies of the biogeography and biogeochemical structure of lakes and rivers (limnology) and Charles Elton's studies of animal food chains were pioneers among the succession of quantitative methods that colonized the developing ecological specialties. Ecology became an independent discipline in the 1940s and 1950s after Eugene P. Odum synthesized many of the concepts of ecosystem ecology, placing relationships between groups of organisms (especially material and energy relationships) at the center of the field.

In the 1960s, as evolutionary theorists explored the possibility of multiple units of selection, ecologists turned to evolutionary approaches. In population ecology, debate over group selection was brief but vigorous; by 1970, most biologists agreed that natural selection was rarely effective above the level of individual organisms. The evolution of ecosystems, however, became a lasting research focus. Ecology expanded rapidly with the rise of the environmental movement; the International Biological Program attempted to apply the methods of big science (which had been so successful in the physical sciences) to ecosystem ecology and pressing environmental issues, while smaller-scale independent efforts such as island biogeography and the Hubbard Brook Experimental Forest helped redefine the scope of an increasingly diverse discipline.

=== Classical genetics, the modern synthesis, and evolutionary theory ===
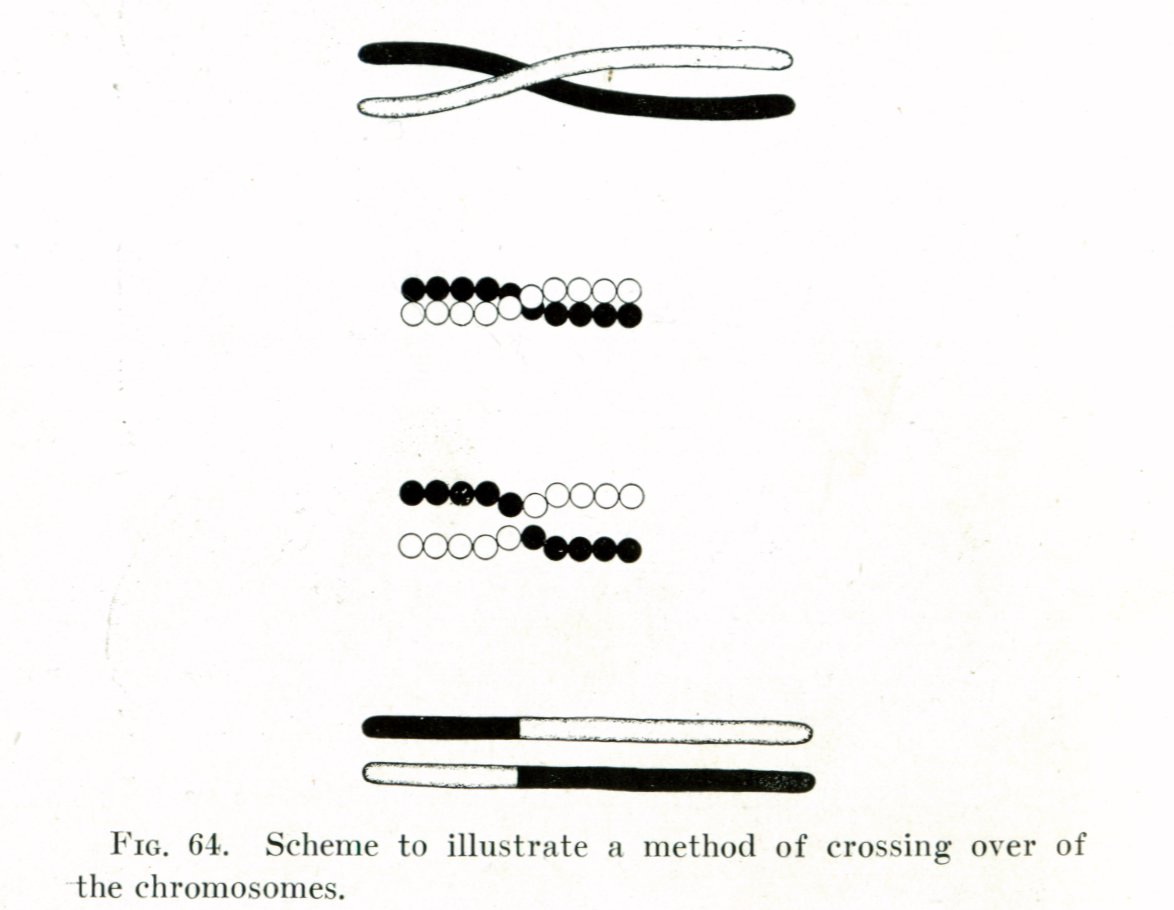
Thomas Hunt Morgan's illustration of crossing over, part of the Mendelian-chromosome theory of heredity

1900 marked the so-called rediscovery of Mendel by Carl Correns, who arrived at Mendel's laws (which were not actually present in Mendel's work). Soon after, cytologists (cell biologists) proposed that chromosomes were the hereditary material. This was taken up by Carl Correns and others between 1910 and 1915 as the "Mendelian-chromosome theory" of heredity. Thomas Hunt Morgan and the "Drosophilists" in his fly lab applied this to a new model organism. They hypothesized crossing over to explain linkage and constructed genetic maps of the fruit fly Drosophila melanogaster, which became a widely used model organism.

Hugo de Vries tried to link the new genetics with evolution; building on his work with heredity and hybridization, he proposed a theory of mutationism, which was widely accepted in the early 20th century. Lamarckism, or the theory of inheritance of acquired characteristics also had many adherents. Darwinism was seen as incompatible with the continuously variable traits studied by biometricians, which seemed only partially heritable. In the 1920s and 1930s—following the acceptance of the Mendelian-chromosome theory— the emergence of the discipline of population genetics, with the work of R.A. Fisher, J.B.S. Haldane and Sewall Wright, unified the idea of evolution by natural selection with Mendelian genetics, producing the modern synthesis. The inheritance of acquired characters was rejected, while mutationism gave way as genetic theories matured.

In the second half of the century the ideas of population genetics began to be applied in the new discipline of the genetics of behavior, sociobiology, and, especially in humans, evolutionary psychology. In the 1960s W.D. Hamilton and others developed game theory approaches to explain altruism from an evolutionary perspective through kin selection. The possible origin of higher organisms through endosymbiosis, and contrasting approaches to molecular evolution in the gene-centered view (which held selection as the predominant cause of evolution) and the neutral theory (which made genetic drift a key factor) spawned perennial debates over the proper balance of adaptationism and contingency in evolutionary theory.

In the 1970s Stephen Jay Gould and Niles Eldredge proposed the theory of punctuated equilibrium which holds that stasis is the most prominent feature of the fossil record, and that most evolutionary changes occur rapidly over relatively short periods of time. In 1980 Luis Alvarez and Walter Alvarez proposed the hypothesis that an impact event was responsible for the Cretaceous–Paleogene extinction event. Also in the early 1980s, statistical analysis of the fossil record of marine organisms published by Jack Sepkoski and David M. Raup led to a better appreciation of the importance of mass extinction events to the history of life on earth.

=== Biochemistry, microbiology, and molecular biology ===
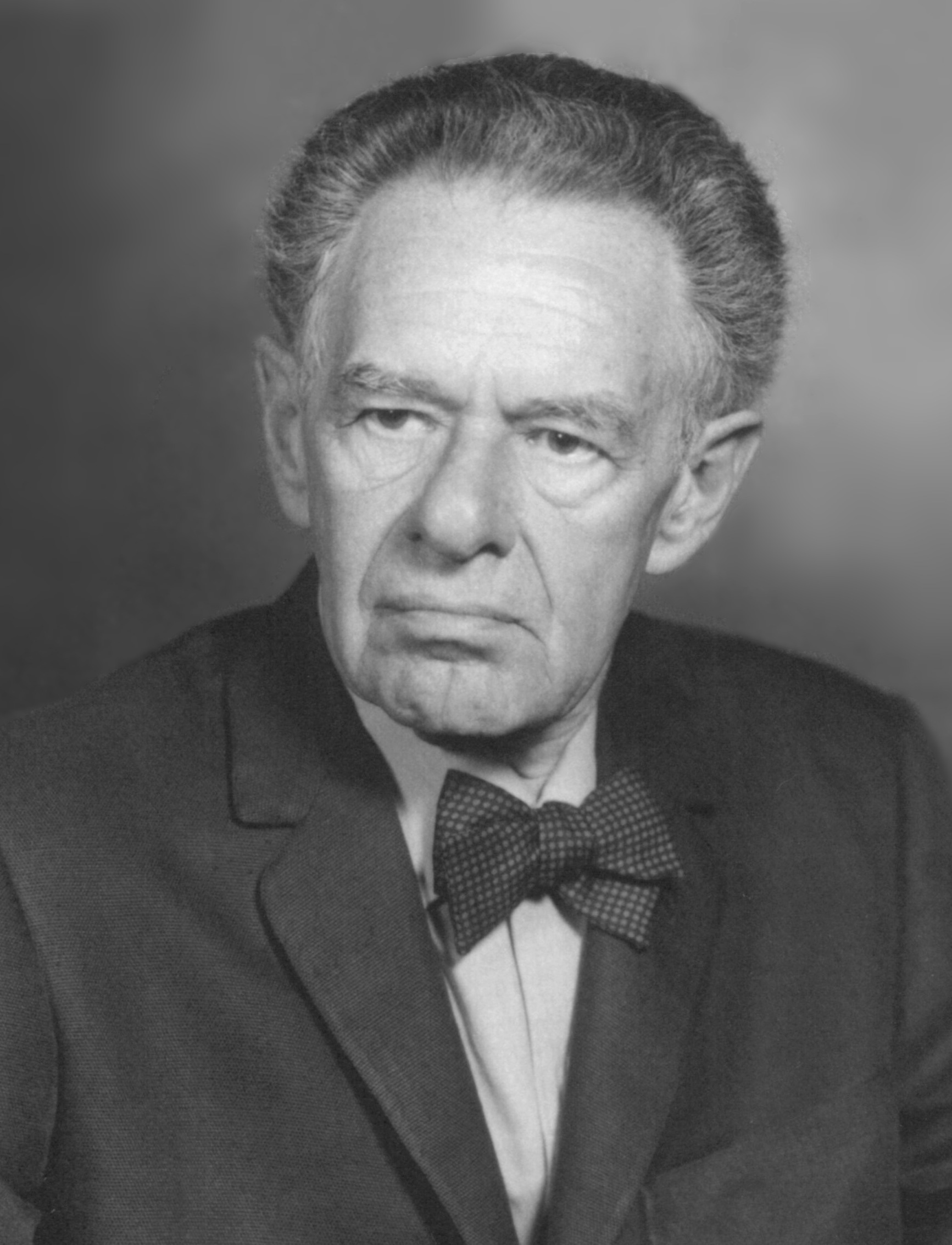
Fritz Albert Lipmann

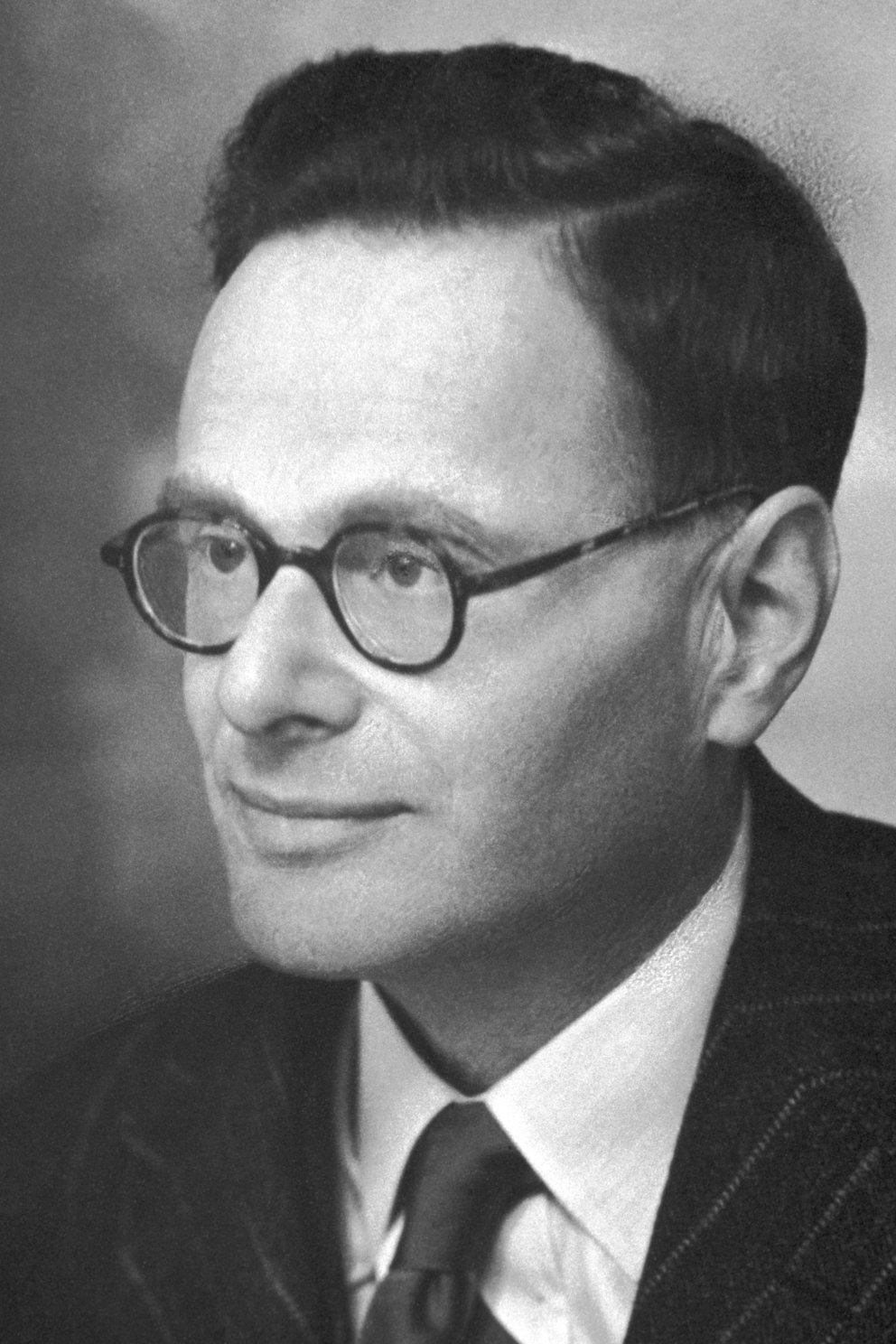
Hans Krebs

By the end of the 19th century all of the major pathways of drug metabolism had been discovered, along with the outlines of protein and fatty acid metabolism and urea synthesis. In the early decades of the 20th century, the minor components of foods in human nutrition, the vitamins, began to be isolated and synthesized. Improved laboratory techniques such as chromatography and electrophoresis led to rapid advances in physiological chemistry, which—as biochemistry—began to achieve independence from its medical origins. In the 1920s and 1930s, biochemists—led by Hans Krebs and Carl and Gerty Cori—began to work out many of the central metabolic pathways of life: the citric acid cycle, glycogenesis and glycolysis, and the synthesis of steroids and porphyrins. Between the 1930s and 1950s, Fritz Lipmann and others established the role of ATP as the universal carrier of energy in the cell, and mitochondria as the powerhouse of the cell. Such traditionally biochemical work continued to be very actively pursued throughout the 20th century and into the 21st.

==== Origins of molecular biology ====
Following the rise of classical genetics, many biologists—including a new wave of physical scientists in biology—pursued the question of the gene and its physical nature. Warren Weaver—head of the science division of the Rockefeller Foundation—issued grants to promote research that applied the methods of physics and chemistry to basic biological problems, coining the term molecular biology for this approach in 1938; many of the significant biological breakthroughs of the 1930s and 1940s were funded by the Rockefeller Foundation.

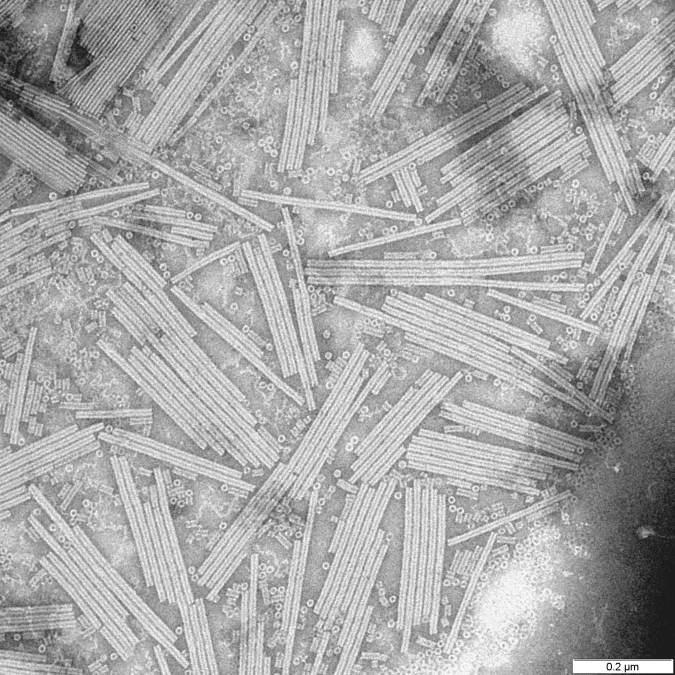
Wendell Stanley's crystallization of tobacco mosaic virus as a pure nucleoprotein in 1935 convinced many scientists that heredity might be explained purely through physics and chemistry.

Like biochemistry, the overlapping disciplines of bacteriology and virology (later combined as microbiology), situated between science and medicine, developed rapidly in the early 20th century. Félix d'Herelle's isolation of bacteriophage during World War I initiated a long line of research focused on phage viruses and the bacteria they infect.

The development of standard, genetically uniform organisms that could produce repeatable experimental results was essential for the development of molecular genetics. After early work with Drosophila and maize, the adoption of simpler model systems like the bread mold Neurospora crassa made it possible to connect genetics to biochemistry, most importantly with Beadle and Tatum's one gene–one enzyme hypothesis in 1941. Genetics experiments on even simpler systems like tobacco mosaic virus and bacteriophage, aided by the new technologies of electron microscopy and ultracentrifugation, forced scientists to re-evaluate the literal meaning of life; virus heredity and reproducing nucleoprotein cell structures outside the nucleus ("plasmagenes") complicated the accepted Mendelian-chromosome theory.

The "central dogma of molecular biology" (originally a "dogma" only in jest) was proposed by Francis Crick in 1958. This is Crick's reconstruction of how he conceived of the central dogma at the time. The solid lines represent (as it seemed in 1958) known modes of information transfer, and the dashed lines represent postulated ones.

Oswald Avery showed in 1943 that DNA was likely the genetic material of the chromosome, not its protein; the issue was settled decisively with the 1952 Hershey–Chase experiment—one of many contributions from the so-called phage group centered around physicist-turned-biologist Max Delbrück. In 1953 James Watson and Francis Crick, building on the work of Maurice Wilkins and Rosalind Franklin, suggested that the structure of DNA was a double helix. In their famous paper "Molecular structure of Nucleic Acids", Watson and Crick noted coyly, "It has not escaped our notice that the specific pairing we have postulated immediately suggests a possible copying mechanism for the genetic material." After the 1958 Meselson–Stahl experiment confirmed the semiconservative replication of DNA, it was clear to most biologists that nucleic acid sequence must somehow determine amino acid sequence in proteins; physicist George Gamow proposed that a fixed genetic code connected proteins and DNA. Between 1953 and 1961, there were few known biological sequences—either DNA or protein—but an abundance of proposed code systems, a situation made even more complicated by expanding knowledge of the intermediate role of RNA. In 1961, it was demonstrated that when a gene encodes a protein, three sequential bases of a gene's DNA specify each successive amino acid of the protein. Thus the genetic code is a triplet code, where each triplet (called a codon) specifies a particular amino acid. Furthermore, it was shown that the codons do not overlap with each other in the DNA sequence encoding a protein, and that each sequence is read from a fixed starting point. To actually decipher the code, it took an extensive series of experiments in biochemistry and bacterial genetics, between 1961 and 1966—most importantly the work of Nirenberg and Khorana. During 1962–1964, numerous conditional lethal mutants of a bacterial virus were isolated. These mutants were used in several different labs to advance fundamental understanding of the functions and interactions of the proteins employed in the machinery of DNA replication, DNA repair, DNA recombination, and in the assembly of molecular structures.

==== Expansion of molecular biology ====
In addition to the Division of Biology at Caltech, the Laboratory of Molecular Biology (and its precursors) at Cambridge, and a handful of other institutions, the Pasteur Institute became a major center for molecular biology research in the late 1950s. Scientists at Cambridge, led by Max Perutz and John Kendrew, focused on the rapidly developing field of structural biology, combining X-ray crystallography with Molecular modelling and the new computational possibilities of digital computing (benefiting both directly and indirectly from the military funding of science). A number of biochemists led by Frederick Sanger later joined the Cambridge lab, bringing together the study of macromolecular structure and function. At the Pasteur Institute, François Jacob and Jacques Monod followed the 1959 PaJaMo experiment with a series of publications regarding the lac operon that established the concept of gene regulation and identified what came to be known as messenger RNA. By the mid-1960s, the intellectual core of molecular biology—a model for the molecular basis of metabolism and reproduction— was largely complete.

The late 1950s to the early 1970s was a period of intense research and institutional expansion for molecular biology, which had only recently become a somewhat coherent discipline. In what organismic biologist E. O. Wilson called "The Molecular Wars", the methods and practitioners of molecular biology spread rapidly, often coming to dominate departments and even entire disciplines. Molecularization was particularly important in genetics, immunology, embryology, and neurobiology, while the idea that life is controlled by a "genetic program"—a metaphor Jacob and Monod introduced from the emerging fields of cybernetics and computer science—became an influential perspective throughout biology. Immunology in particular became linked with molecular biology, with innovation flowing both ways: the clonal selection theory developed by Niels Jerne and Frank Macfarlane Burnet in the mid-1950s helped shed light on the general mechanisms of protein synthesis.

Resistance to the growing influence of molecular biology was especially evident in evolutionary biology. Protein sequencing had great potential for the quantitative study of evolution (through the molecular clock hypothesis), but leading evolutionary biologists questioned the relevance of molecular biology for answering the big questions of evolutionary causation. Departments and disciplines fractured as organismic biologists asserted their importance and independence: Theodosius Dobzhansky made the famous statement that "nothing in biology makes sense except in the light of evolution" as a response to the molecular challenge. The issue became even more critical after 1968; Motoo Kimura's neutral theory of molecular evolution suggested that natural selection was not the ubiquitous cause of evolution, at least at the molecular level, and that molecular evolution might be a fundamentally different process from morphological evolution. (Resolving this "molecular/morphological paradox" has been a central focus of molecular evolution research since the 1960s.)

=== Biotechnology, genetic engineering, and genomics ===
Biotechnology in the general sense has been an important part of biology since the late 19th century. With the industrialization of brewing and agriculture, chemists and biologists became aware of the great potential of human-controlled biological processes. In particular, fermentation proved a great boon to chemical industries. By the early 1970s, a wide range of biotechnologies were being developed, from drugs like penicillin and steroids to foods like Chlorella and single-cell protein to gasohol—as well as a wide range of hybrid high-yield crops and agricultural technologies, the basis for the Green Revolution.

Carefully engineered strains of the bacterium Escherichia coli are crucial tools in biotechnology as well as many other biological fields.

==== Recombinant DNA ====
Biotechnology in the modern sense of genetic engineering began in the 1970s, with the invention of recombinant DNA techniques. Restriction enzymes were discovered and characterized in the late 1960s, following on the heels of the isolation, then duplication, then synthesis of viral genes. Beginning with the lab of Paul Berg in 1972 (aided by EcoRI from Herbert Boyer's lab, building on work with ligase by Arthur Kornberg's lab), molecular biologists put these pieces together to produce the first transgenic organisms. Soon after, others began using plasmid vectors and adding genes for antibiotic resistance, greatly increasing the reach of the recombinant techniques.

Wary of the potential dangers (particularly the possibility of a prolific bacteria with a viral cancer-causing gene), the scientific community as well as a wide range of scientific outsiders reacted to these developments with both enthusiasm and fearful restraint. Prominent molecular biologists led by Berg suggested a temporary moratorium on recombinant DNA research until the dangers could be assessed and policies could be created. This moratorium was largely respected, until the participants in the 1975 Asilomar Conference on Recombinant DNA created policy recommendations and concluded that the technology could be used safely.

Following Asilomar, new genetic engineering techniques and applications developed rapidly. DNA sequencing methods improved greatly (pioneered by Frederick Sanger and Walter Gilbert), as did oligonucleotide synthesis and transfection techniques. Researchers learned to control the expression of transgenes, and were soon racing—in both academic and industrial contexts—to create organisms capable of expressing human genes for the production of human hormones. However, this was a more daunting task than molecular biologists had expected; developments between 1977 and 1980 showed that, due to the phenomena of split genes and splicing, higher organisms had a much more complex system of gene expression than the bacteria models of earlier studies. The first such race, for synthesizing human insulin, was won by Genentech. This marked the beginning of the biotech boom (and with it, the era of gene patents), with an unprecedented level of overlap between biology, industry, and law.

==== Molecular systematics and genomics ====
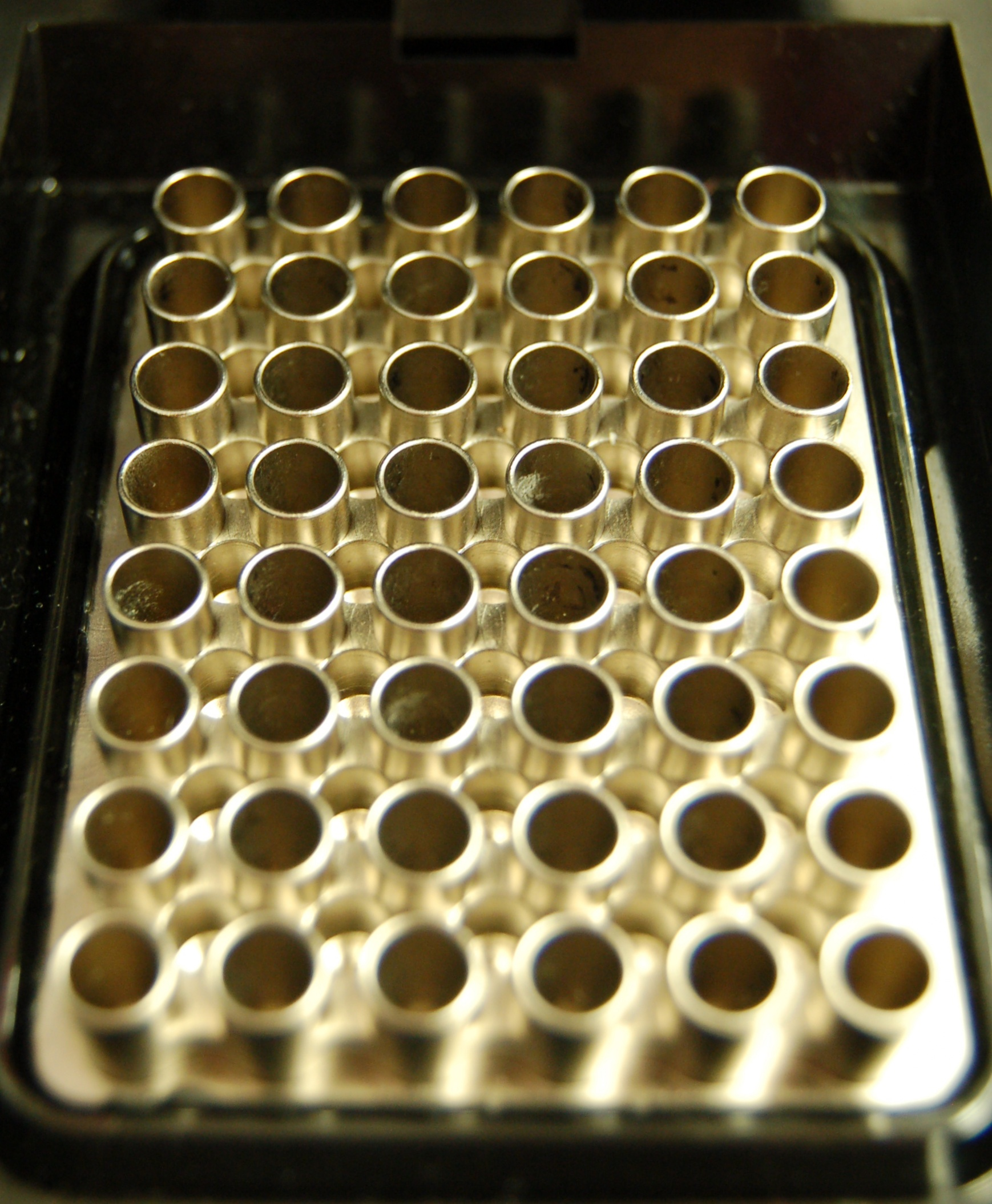
Inside of a 48-well thermal cycler, a device used to perform polymerase chain reaction on many samples at once

By the 1980s, protein sequencing had already transformed methods of scientific classification of organisms (especially cladistics) but biologists soon began to use RNA and DNA sequences as characters; this expanded the significance of molecular evolution within evolutionary biology, as the results of molecular systematics could be compared with traditional evolutionary trees based on morphology. Following the pioneering ideas of Lynn Margulis on endosymbiotic theory, which holds that some of the organelles of eukaryotic cells originated from free living prokaryotic organisms through symbiotic relationships, even the overall division of the tree of life was revised. Into the 1990s, the five domains (Plants, Animals, Fungi, Protists, and Monerans) became three (the Archaea, the Bacteria, and the Eukarya) based on Carl Woese's pioneering molecular systematics work with 16S rRNA sequencing.

The development and popularization of the polymerase chain reaction (PCR) in mid-1980s (by Kary Mullis and others at Cetus Corp.) marked another watershed in the history of modern biotechnology, greatly increasing the ease and speed of genetic analysis. Coupled with the use of expressed sequence tags, PCR led to the discovery of many more genes than could be found through traditional biochemical or genetic methods and opened the possibility of sequencing entire genomes.

The unity of much of the morphogenesis of organisms from fertilized egg to adult began to be unraveled after the discovery of the homeobox genes, first in fruit flies, then in other insects and animals, including humans. These developments led to advances in the field of evolutionary developmental biology towards understanding how the various body plans of the animal phyla have evolved and how they are related to one another.

The Human Genome Project—the largest, most costly single biological study ever undertaken—began in 1988 under the leadership of James D. Watson, after preliminary work with genetically simpler model organisms such as E. coli, S. cerevisiae and C. elegans. Shotgun sequencing and gene discovery methods pioneered by Craig Venter—and fueled by the financial promise of gene patents with Celera Genomics— led to a public–private sequencing competition that ended in compromise with the first draft of the human DNA sequence announced in 2000.

== Twenty-first century biological sciences ==
At the beginning of the 21st century, biological sciences converged with previously differentiated new and classic disciplines like physics into research fields like biophysics. Advances were made in analytical chemistry and physics instrumentation including improved sensors, optics, tracers, instrumentation, signal processing, networks, robots, satellites, and compute power for data collection, storage, analysis, modeling, visualization, and simulations. These technological advances allowed theoretical and experimental research including internet publication of molecular biochemistry, biological systems, and ecosystems science. This enabled worldwide access to better measurements, theoretical models, complex simulations, theory predictive model experimentation, analysis, worldwide internet observational data reporting, open peer-review, collaboration, and internet publication. New fields of biological sciences research emerged including bioinformatics, neuroscience, theoretical biology, computational genomics, astrobiology and synthetic biology.

== See also ==
- History of botany
- Outline of biology
- Timeline of biology and organic chemistry
