= Bartholomäus Keckermann =

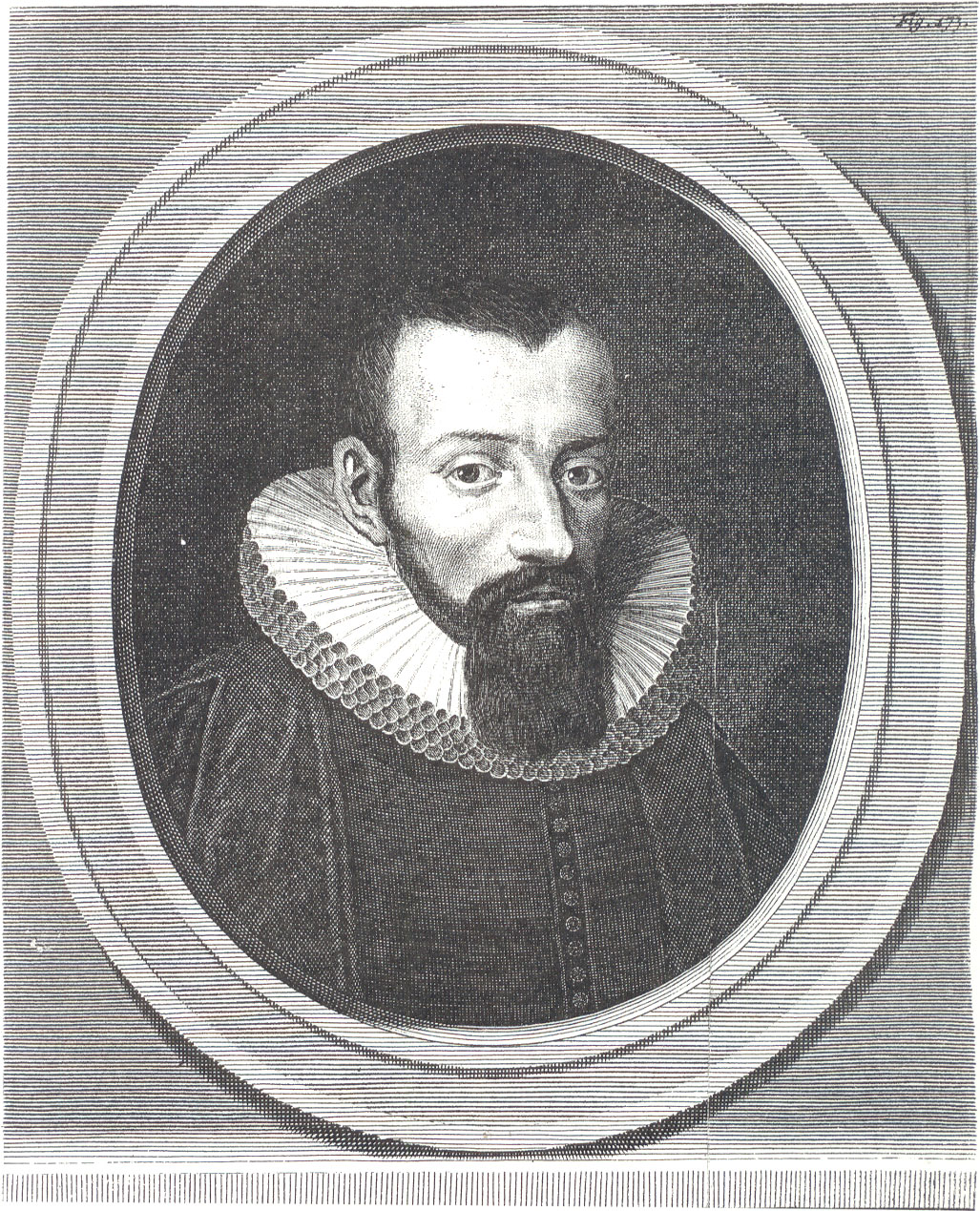
Bartholomäus Keckermann.

Bartholomäus Keckermann (c. 1572 – 25 August (or July) 1609) was a German writer, Calvinist theologian and philosopher. He is known for his Analytic Method. As a writer on rhetoric, he is often compared to Gerhard Johann Vossius, and is considered influential in Northern Europe and England.

== Biography ==
Keckermann was born in Gdańsk (Danzig), in the Kingdom of Poland, to Calvinists Georg and Gertrude Keckermann. He attended the local Academic Gymnasium before moving on to the University of Wittenberg (May 1590) and the University of Leipzig (spring 1592). However, following the death of Prince Christian I in 1591, Keckermann participated in the migration of Calvinist academics to the University of Heidelberg in October 1592. He received his Master of Arts degree on 27 February 1595. On 4 February, he was appointed Professor of Hebrew there. In 1601, he returned to his home town to teach as rector (1602–1608) at the Gymnasium of Danzig. His numerous works were published towards the end of his short life, or (most of them) posthumously.

Keckermann died in Danzig. He is described in Melchior Adam's works.

== Publications ==
Publications:

- Praecognitorum logicorum tractatus tres (Hanau, 1599).
- Systema grammaticae Hebraeae, sive, sanctae linguae exactior methodus (Hanau, ca. 1600?).
- Systema logicae, tribus libris adornatum, pleniore praeceptorum methodo, et commentariis scriptis ad praeceptorum illustrationem (Hanau, 1600).
- Systema logicae, compendiosa methodo (Hanau, 1601).
- Systema S. S. Theologiae, tribus libris adornatum. Methodum ac dispositione[m] operis tabula praefixa adumbrat. Cum indice rerum & verborum locupletissimo (Hanau, 1602).
- Systema logicae minus. Succincto praeceptorum compendio tribus libris adornatum ... ut servire possit gymnasio Dantiscano ... (Gdansk, 1605).
- Gymnasium logicum (London, 1606).
- Systema disciplinae politicae, publicis praelectionibus anno MDCVI propositum in gymnasio Dantiscano (Hanau, 1607).
- Systema ethicae, tribus libris adornatum [et] publicis praelectionibus traditum in gymnasio Dantiscano (Hanau and London, 1607).
- Systema rhetoricae, in quo artis praecepta plene et methodice traduntur (Hanau, 1608).
- Apparatus practicus sive idea methodica et plena totius philosophiae practicae (Hanau, 1609).
- Scientiae metaphysicae compendiosum systema (Hanau, 1609).
- Systematis logici plenioris (Hanau, 1609).
- Systema physicum, septem libris adornatum (Hanau, 1610).
- Systema astronomiae compendiosum (Hanau, 1611).
- Systema geographicum duobus libris adornatum (Hanau, 1612).
- Systema systematum clarissimi viri Dr. Bartholomaei Keckermanni, omnia hujus autoris scripta philosophica uno volumine comprehensa lectori exhibens, 2 vols. (Hanau, 1613).
