= Gottfried Lengnich =

18th-century historian and politician

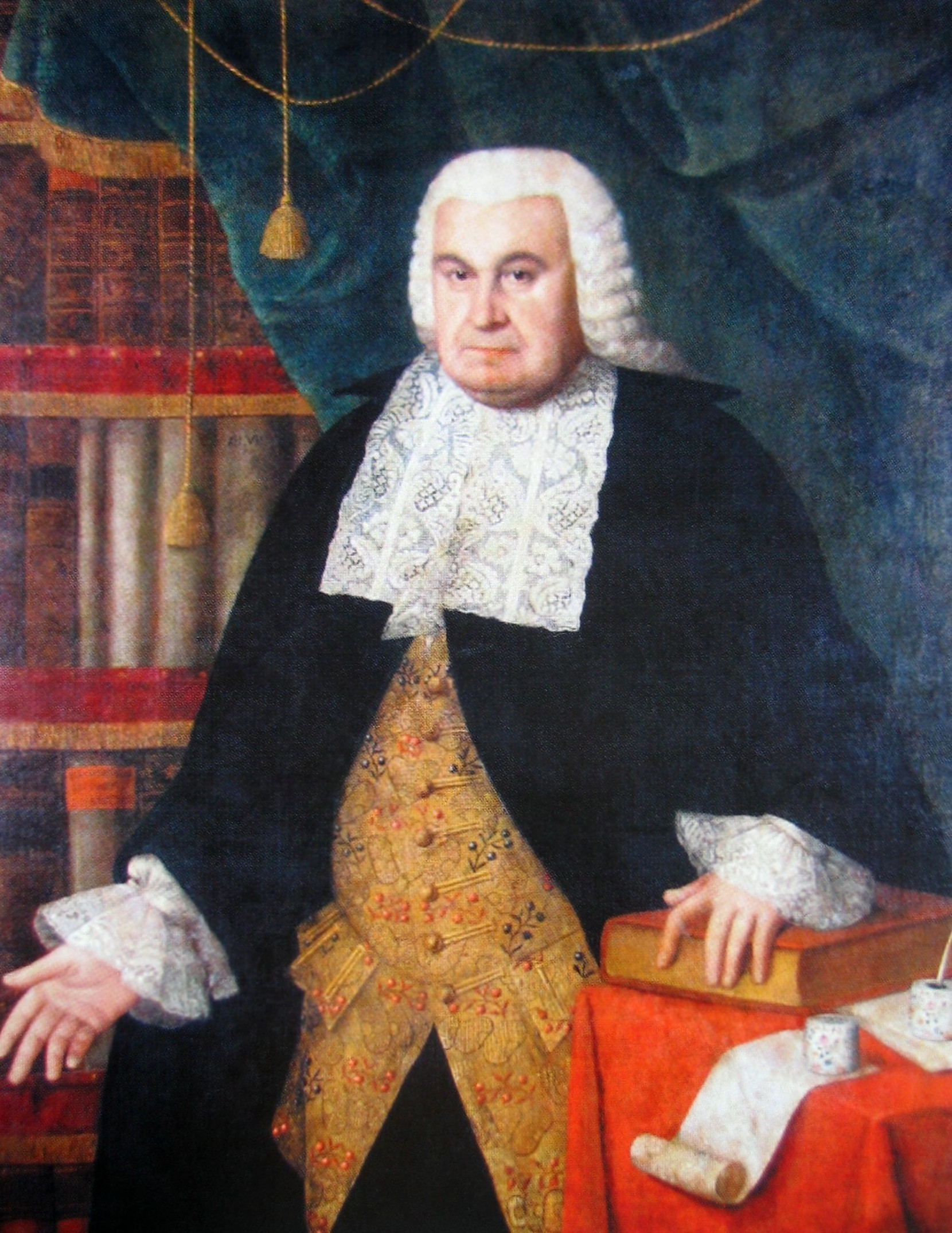
Gottfried Lengnich, ca. 1750

Gottfried Lengnich (Polish: Gotfryd Lengnich) (4 December 1689 – 28 April 1774) was an 18th-century historian, lawyer and politician. He became known for writing the 9-volume History of Royal Prussia and for teaching Stanisław August Poniatowski, the last king of Poland.

== Life ==
Gottfried Lengnich was born to the family of a wealthy merchant in Danzig (now Gdańsk), Royal Prussia, Kingdom of Poland. Initially studying at the local college of the St. Mary's church, he was sent to Mewe (Gniew) to study the Polish language at the age of 13 before returning to Danzig to study at the Academic Gymnasium. In 1710 he went to the university of Halle, at that time a part of the Electorate of Brandenburg, where in 1713 he received a doctorate in law. Following a brief career at the Hallische Bibliothek digest, he returned to Danzig to study the history of Danzig law and of the law of Royal Prussia and Poland, to find out whether us Prussians ... are the Poles' equal brothers or their servants.

In 1718 he started the Polonische Bibliothek issued in the German language, the first historical journal about Poland. However, the following year the journal faced financial difficulties and had to be closed down. In 1720 Lengnich also founded one of the first scientific societies in his home town, the Societas Literaria (see also Danzig Research Society). As perhaps the only specialist in the history of Pomerania and Pomerelia, in 1721 he was chosen by the City Council as the official historian of the city, entitled with continuation of Kasper Schütz's monumental Historia Rerum Prussicarum. His History of Royal Prussia, published in 9 volumes, covered the period between 1526 and 1733.

In 1729 Lengnich also became the professor of rhetorics and poetry at the Academic Gymnasium, a Protestant Latin language college located in Danzig. The following year he got married. In 1733, during the Siege of Danzig and the War of the Polish Succession, Lengnich was introduced to General Stanisław Poniatowski, the voivode of Masovia and a prominent Polish politician. The latter hired Lengnich as a teacher for two of his sons, one of them being Stanisław August Poniatowski, who later became the last king of Poland. It was for the future king that Lengnich wrote a guidebook to the history of Poland, published in 1740 under the title of Historia Polona a Lecho ad Augusti II mortem (Polish history from Lech to the death of Augustus II). In 1737 he became an honorary member of the St. Petersburg Academy of Sciences.

During the period of interregnum following the death of Augustus II the Strong, Lengnich became involved in local politics and was initially a partisan of Stanisław Leszczyński. However, later he changed sides and went on to support Augustus III, who rewarded Lengnich with the title of Royal Legislative Minister in 1740. Thanks to the king's support in 1750 he also became a syndic for the City of Danzig.

As a politician, Lengnich promoted the rights of dissidents, that is non-Catholic gentry. Like Daniel Gralath he was a strong proponent of the autonomy of Royal Prussia within the Polish–Lithuanian Commonwealth, and opposed the forces that wanted to involve Danzig into internal Polish affairs, among them being the Confederation of Bar. As a historian he is best known for his 9-volume Geschichte der preußischen Lande Königlich-Polnischen Antheils (History of Royal Prussia), as well as several codices on law. Among the latter was the first edition of the Ius publicum Regni Poloniae (Public Law of the Kingdom of Poland) inspired by bishop Andrzej Stanisław Załuski and the Ius publicum civitatis Gedanensis oder der Stadt Danzig Verfassung und Rechte (Public law of the city of Danzig, or the city's constitution and rights, 1769). He was also the editor of the first edition of Polish Chronicle by Gallus Anonymous (who at that time was assumed to have been a Pole) and the Chronicle by Wincenty Kadłubek.

== Work ==
- Des Syndicus der Stadt Danzig Gottfried Lengnich ius publicum civitatis Gedanensis oder der Stadt Danzig Verfassung und Rechte, 1769, published by Otto Günther, Danzig 1900 (initially only intended for internal use within city administration)
- Geschichte der preußischen Lande / königlich=polnischen Antheils / seit dem Jahre 1526, Danzig 1722-1725
- Historia Polona A Lecho In Annum 1748, Danzig 1750
- Jus Publicum Prussiae Polonae, Danzig 1758

== Biography ==
- Włodzimierz Zientara, Gottfried Lengnich. Ein Danziger Historiker in der Zeit der Aufklärung, Toruń 1995 (Diss.)
