= Daniel Gralath =

Politician and physicist of the Polish-Lithuanian Commonwealth

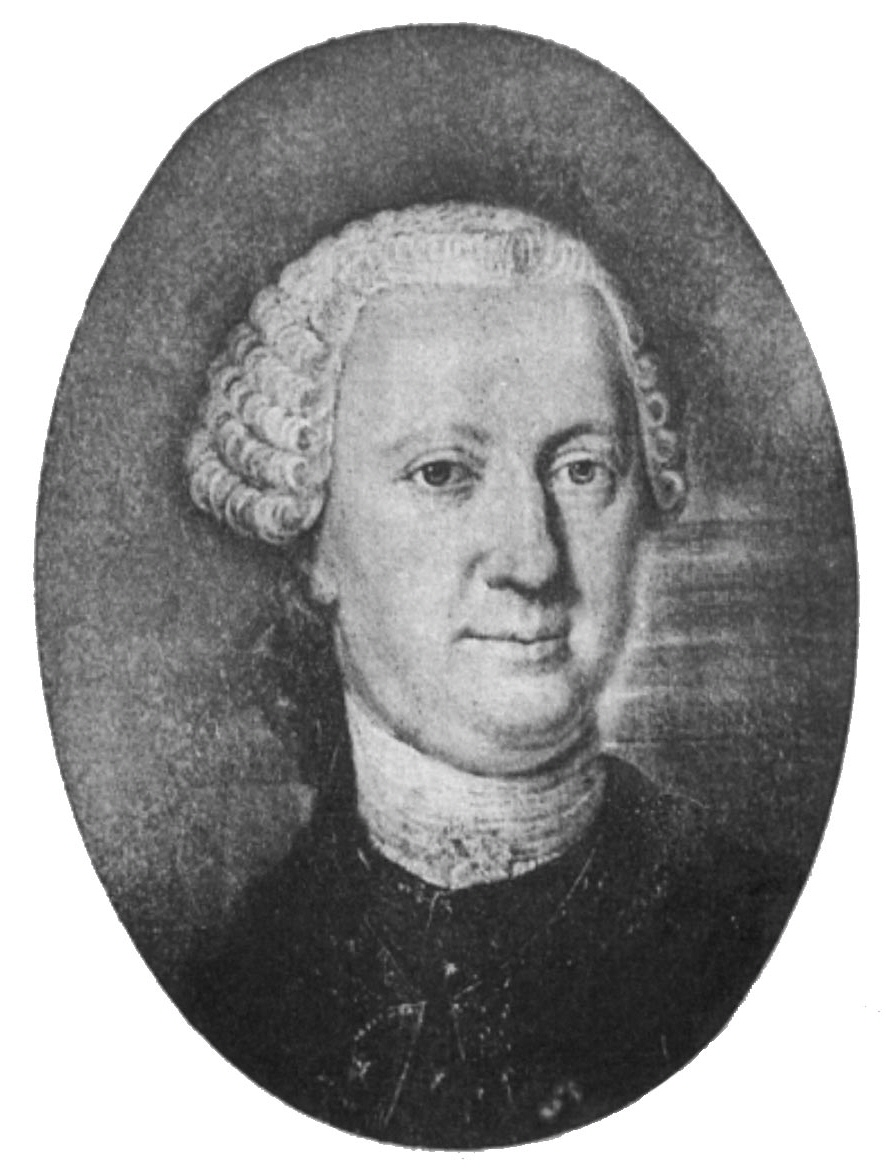
Daniel Gralath

Daniel Gralath (30 May 1708 – 23 July 1767) was a physicist and a mayor of Danzig.

Gralath was born and died in Danzig (Gdańsk) in the Polish–Lithuanian Commonwealth. He came from a well-to-do trade family. He studied law and philosophy in Halle, Leyden and Marburg from 1728 to 1734. Later he became councilman and, in 1763, mayor of Danzig. His father-in-law was Jacob Theodor Klein (1685–1759), a city secretary and a distinguished scientist, nicknamed Gedanensium Plinius.

As a physicist, Gralath worked on electricity, founded the Danzig Research Society, and repeated the experiments of Ewald Georg von Kleist with the Leyden jar. Gralath improved the design of the Leyden jar and demonstrated its effects on a chain of 20 persons. He was also the first to combine several jars to make a battery, but that claim is disputed. From 1747 to 1756, he published his "History of Electricity" in three parts in issues of Versuche und Abhandlungen der Naturforschende Gesellschaft in Danzig, which may have contributed to the historical judgement that he was the first to combine several Leyden jars.
