= Michael Christoph Hanow =

German historian and scientist

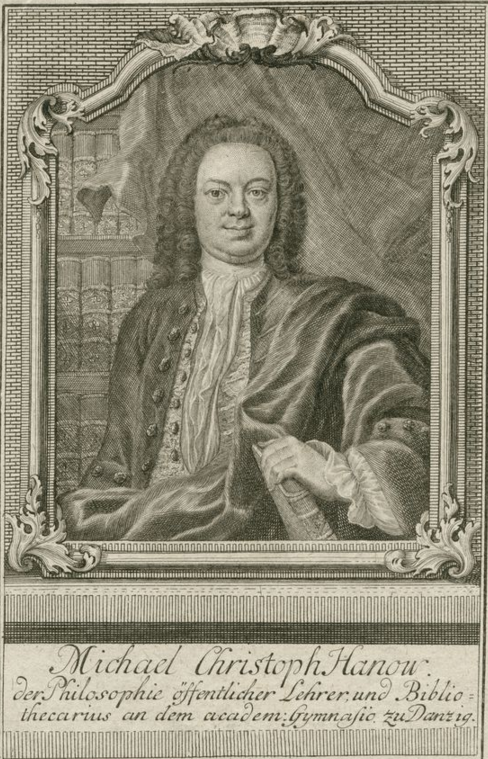
Michael Christoph Hanow

Michael Christoph Hanow (also Hanov, Hanovius) (12 December 1695, in Zamborst near Neustettin, Pomerania – 22 September 1773, in Danzig) was a German meteorologist, historian, professor of mathematics and since 1717 rector of the Academic Gymnasium Danzig.

Hanow was educated in Danzig and Leipzig and was a private teacher in Dresden, Leipzig and Danzig. In the year 1727 he became a member of the Academic Gymnasium Danzig. He wrote numerous articles and books. Since 1739 he published the Danziger Nachrichten a weekly journal with weather forecasting. The term biology was introduced by him. In the years 1745 until 1767 he wrote Jus Culmense, the complete Kulm law (Kulmer Recht) and a collection of not yet published Prussian documents.

Together with Georg Daniel Seyler, Gottfried Lengnich and David Braun he belonged to the most important local historians in the 18th century.

== Literature ==
- Michael Christoph Hanow: Philosophiae naturalis sive physicae dogmaticae: Geologia, biologia, phytologia generalis et dendrologia. 1766.
- Carl von Prantl, Works of Hanov, Michael Christoph. In: Allgemeine Deutsche Biographie (ADB). volume 10, Duncker & Humblot, Leipzig 1879, page 524 f.
