= Timeline of Gdańsk =

Coordinates: 54°21′N 18°40′E

The following is a timeline of the history of the city of Gdańsk, Poland.

== Middle Ages ==
Timeline of Gdańsk
Historical affiliations

Duchy of Poland 997–1025
Kingdom of Poland 1025–1227
Duchy of Pomerelia 1227–1282
Kingdom of Poland 1282–1308
Teutonic Order 1308–1410
Kingdom of Poland 1410–1411
Teutonic Order 1411–1454
Kingdom of Poland 1454–1569
Polish–Lithuanian Commonwealth 1569–1793
Kingdom of Prussia 1793–1807
Free City of Danzig 1807–1814
Kingdom of Prussia 1814–1867
North German Confederation 1867–1871
German Empire 1871–1918
Weimar Germany 1918–1920
Free City of Danzig 1920–1939
Nazi Germany 1939–1945
People's Republic of Poland 1945–1989
Republic of Poland 1989–present

- c. VII century - Settlement is established on the Motława river.
- c. X century - Gdańsk becomes a defensive fort for Kashubian dukes.
- 997 - Saint Adalbert baptises the citizens of urbs Gyddannyzc.
- 1013 - Poland loses influence over the region.
- 1047 - Casimir I takes back control over Gdańsk.
- 1186 - Cistercians establish a monastery in Oliwa.
- 1216 - Świętopełk II takes control of Pomerania.
- 1224 - Gdańsk granted city rights.
- 1226 - Monastery in Oliwa is raided by pagan Old Prussians.
- 1227 - Dominican Monastery founded in Gdańsk.
- 1253 - Oliwa is raided by the Teutonic Order.
- 1260 - St. Dominic's Fair begins.
- 1263 - The village of Wrzeszcz, today's borough of Gdańsk, mentioned for the first time.
- 1271 - First mention of Polanki and Przymorze.
- 1294, 1295 - Visits of Polish King Przemysł II.
- 1308 - November 13: Teutonic takeover of Gdańsk.
- 1325 - Brzeźno is mentioned for the first time.
- 1326 - St. Catherine's Church built.
- 1327 - Construction of the Gdańsk Town Hall begins.
- 1343 - Casimir III the Great agrees to give Gdańsk Pomerania to the Teutonic order as a fief.
- 1346 - Gaol Tower built.
- 1350 - Artus Court built (approximate date).
- 1360 - City joins Hanseatic League (approximate date).
- 1380 - First Scots settled in the city, founding what would eventually become a significant Scottish diaspora in Poland.
- 1391 - Foundation of the Marienbrunn Abbey.
- 1410 - The city recognized Polish King Władysław II Jagiełło as rightful ruler.
- 1411 - The city came under Teutonic rule again.
- 1416 - A revolt against the local government happens due to its weak management.
- 1427 - First mention of Armenians in the city.
- 1440 - City joins the anti-Teutonic Prussian Confederation.
- 1454
  - 11 February: Townspeople captured the local castle.
  - 6 March: City reincorporated to the Kingdom of Poland by King Casimir IV Jagiellon upon the request of the Prussian Confederation.
  - March: City authorized by the Polish king to mint Polish coins.
  - June: City solemnly pledged allegiance to the King in Elbląg, recognizing the Teutonic annexation and rule as unlawful.

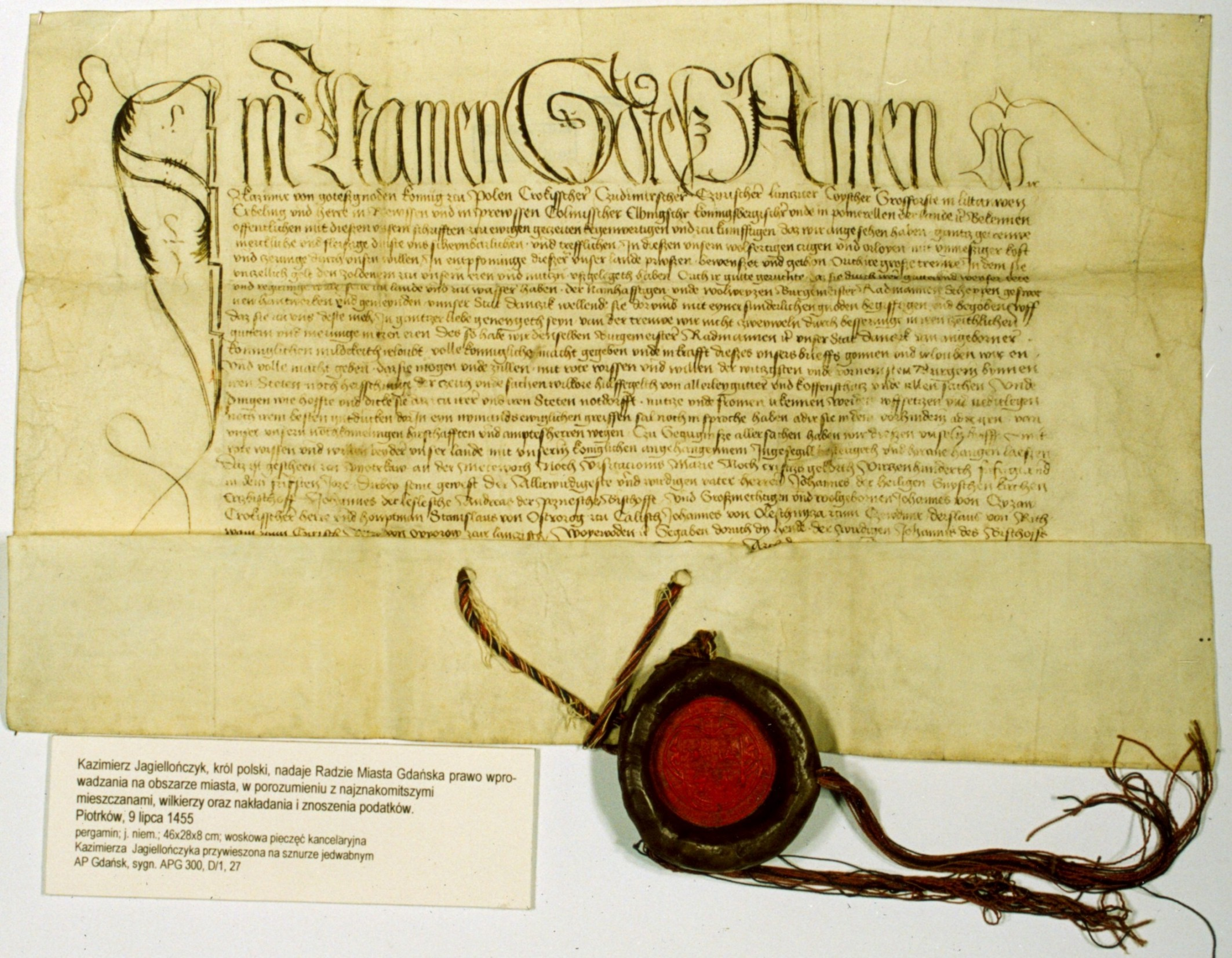
Royal privilege of Casimir IV Jagiellon concerning taxes (1455)

- 1455 - Danzig law in effect (approximate date).
- 1458 - Truce between Poland and Denmark signed, after Denmark initially sided with the Teutonic Knights in the Thirteen Years' War (1454–1466).
- 1463 - The fleets of Elbląg and Gdańsk defeat the Teutonics on the Vistula Lagoon.
- 1465 - St. John's Church built.
- 1481 - Artus Court rebuilt.
- 1494 - Hall of the Brotherhood of St. George built.

== 16th to 18th centuries ==
- 1502 - St. Mary's Church completed.
- 1504 - Nicolaus Copernicus visited the city several times.
- 1514 - Trinity Church built.
- 1520 - During the Polish-Teutonic War, the Landsknecht coordinated an attack on Gdańsk.
- 1525 - The Gdańsk Tumult - Lutherans organise a revolt against mayor Eberhard Ferber.
- 1526
  - January - The council is overthrown by the revolt.
  - April - King Sigismund I enters the city with eight thousand men, executing the rebels and asserting his power over the region.
  - July: Nicolaus Copernicus visited the city.
- 1537 - Franz Rhode sets up printing press.

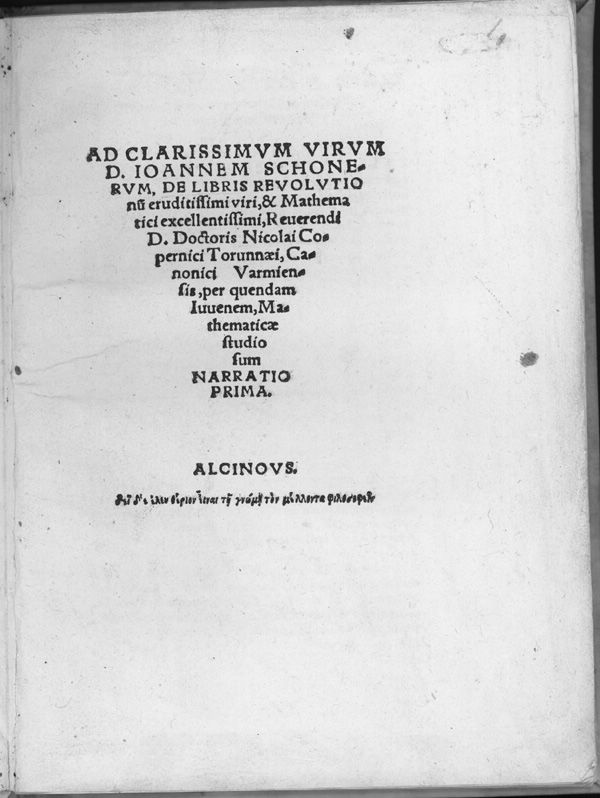
Narratio Prima, an abstract of Nicolaus Copernicus' heliocentric theory published in 1540

- 1540 - Narratio Prima, an abstract of Nicolaus Copernicus' heliocentric theory published.
- 1557 - Sigismund II grants Protestants equal rights.
- 1558 - Academic Gymnasium established.
- 1561 - Main Town Hall tower built, with a gilded statue of Polish King Sigismund II Augustus placed at its top.
- 1568 - Green Gate built.
- 1569
  - City becomes part of Polish–Lithuanian Commonwealth.
  - Mennonite Church founded.
- 1575 - Danzig rebellion begins.
- 1577
  - April 17: Battle of Lubieszów.
  - Siege of Danzig by Stephen Báthory of Poland.
- 1587 - Sigismund III Vasa swore the pacta conventa in Oliwa prior to his coronation as King of Poland.
- 1588 - Highland Gate erected.
- 1594 - Oliwa Cathedral consecrated.
- 1596 - Bibliotheca Senatus Gedanensis established.
- 1605 - Arsenal built at the Coal Market Square.
- 1606 - Der Lachs distillery in business.
- 1614 - Golden Gate built.
- 1621 - Jesuit College established in the present-day neighbourhood of Stare Szkoty.

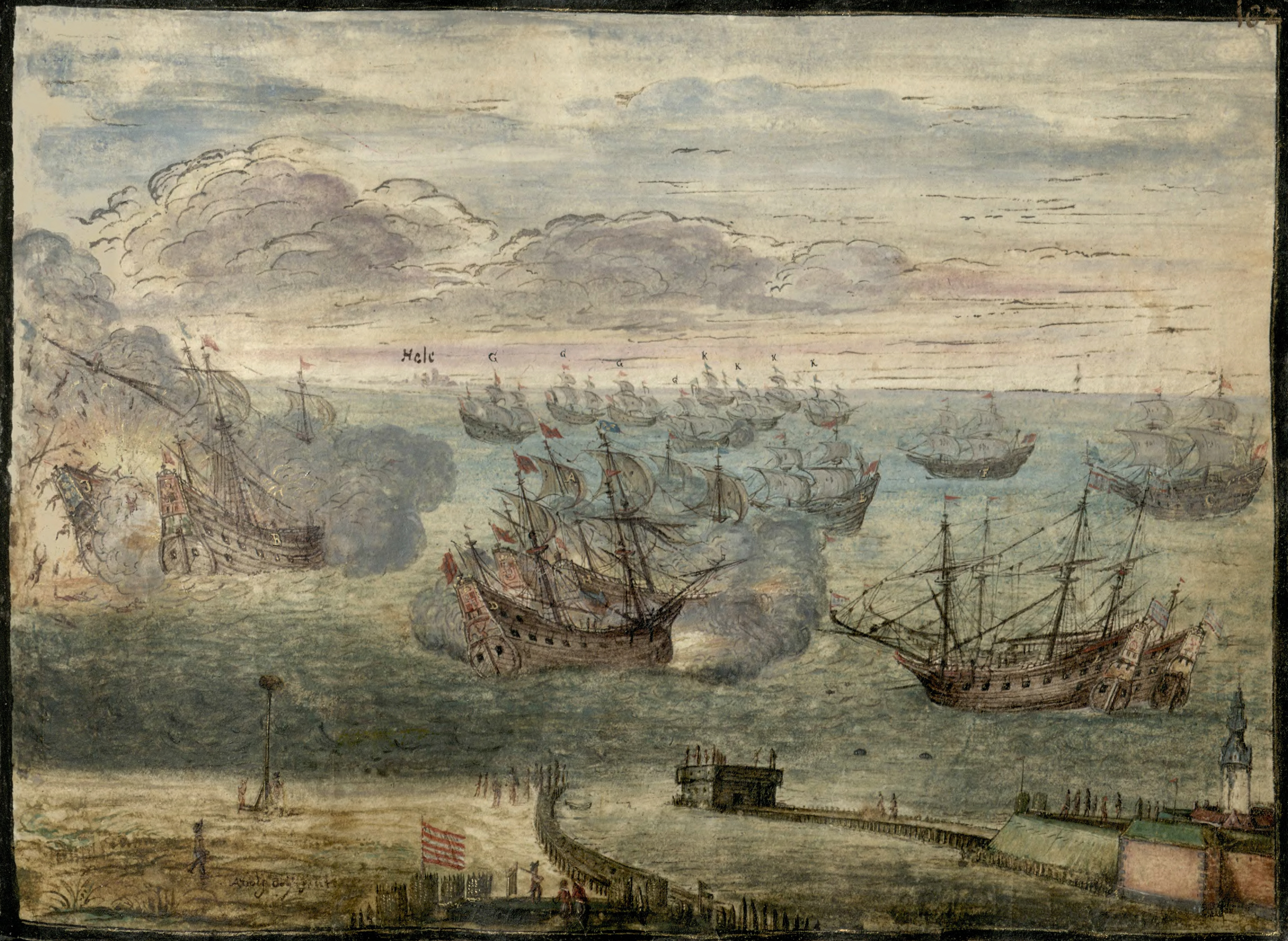
Battle of Oliwa (1627)

- 1627 - Battle of Oliwa during the Polish–Swedish War (1626–1629), won by Poland.
- 1633 - Neptune's Fountain installed at the Long Market.
- 1640 - Jan Heweliusz established his astronomical observatory in the Old Town.
- 1644 - Adam Wybe constructed the world's first aerial lift.
- 1655 - Deluge (Swedish invasion of Poland): Siege of Danzig (1655–1660) begins.
- 1660 - Treaty of Oliva signed.
- 1677 - An alliance treaty between Poland and Sweden signed.
- 1681 - Royal Chapel of the Polish King John III Sobieski built.
- 1686 - French Huguenot commune founded.
- 1703–1711 - Large scale arms smuggling for Hungarian insurgents during the Rákóczi's War of Independence against Austria.
- 1709 - Bubonic plague.
- 1711–1712 - Stay of Hungarian national hero Francis II Rákóczi in the city following the Rákóczi's War of Independence.
- 1734 - Siege of Danzig by Russians during the War of the Polish Succession.
- 1742
  - Experimental Physics Society organized.
  - Corn exchange opens in Artus Court.
- 1755 - Marble statue of King of Augustus III of Poland unveiled in the Artus Court.
- 1756 - Abbot's Palace expanded.
- 1772 - After the First Partition of Poland the city became separated from the rest of Poland, it remained a Polish exclave.
- 1793
  - Second Partition of Poland - city annexed by Prussia.
  - Municipal Library established.
- 1797 - Attempt of student uprising against Prussia, crushed quickly by the Prussian authorities.

== 19th century ==
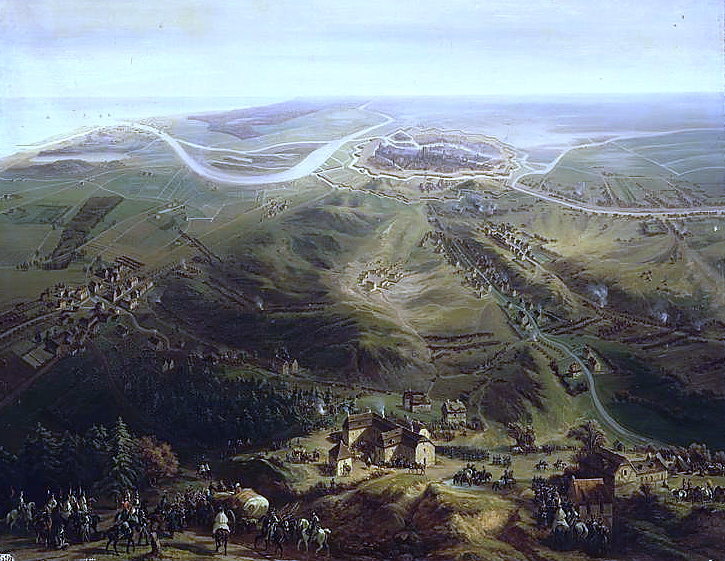
Siege by French-Polish-Italian-Saxon forces in 1807

- 1807
  - March 19-May 24: Siege of Danzig by French-Polish-Italian-Saxon-Baden forces.
  - September 9: Free City of Danzig established by Napoleon.
- 1813 - January–December 29: Siege of Danzig by Russian and Prussian forces.
- 1814 - City becomes part of Prussia again.
- 1815 - City becomes administrative capital of Danzig (region).
- 1831
  - October 18–19: 2nd and 4th Polish Cavalry Brigades of the November Uprising stopped near the city on their way to their final internment places.
  - November 10: Several further cavalry units of the 1st and 2nd Polish Cavalry Brigades stopped near the city on their way to their final internment places.
- 1832
  - May: 52 Polish insurgents depart partitioned Poland on ship to Bordeaux, France (see Great Emigration).
  - 23 June: Over 450 Polish insurgents depart partitioned Poland on ship to Bordeaux, France.
  - Summer: Polish insurgents imprisoned by the Prussians at Biskupia Górka.
  - Trade academy established.
- 1833, November - Over 500 Polish insurgents depart partitioned Poland on ships to France, the United Kingdom and the United States.
- 1852 - Königliche Werft Danzig in business.
- 1871
  - City becomes part of German Empire.
  - Franciscan monastery building restored.
- 1880 - Westpreussische Provinzial-Museum opens.
- 1885 - Population: 114,805.
- 1887 - Great Synagogue built.
- 1896 - Old fortifications dismantled in north and west of city.
- 1899 - Harbor built at Neufahrwasser (Nowy Port).
- 1900 - Main railway station opens.

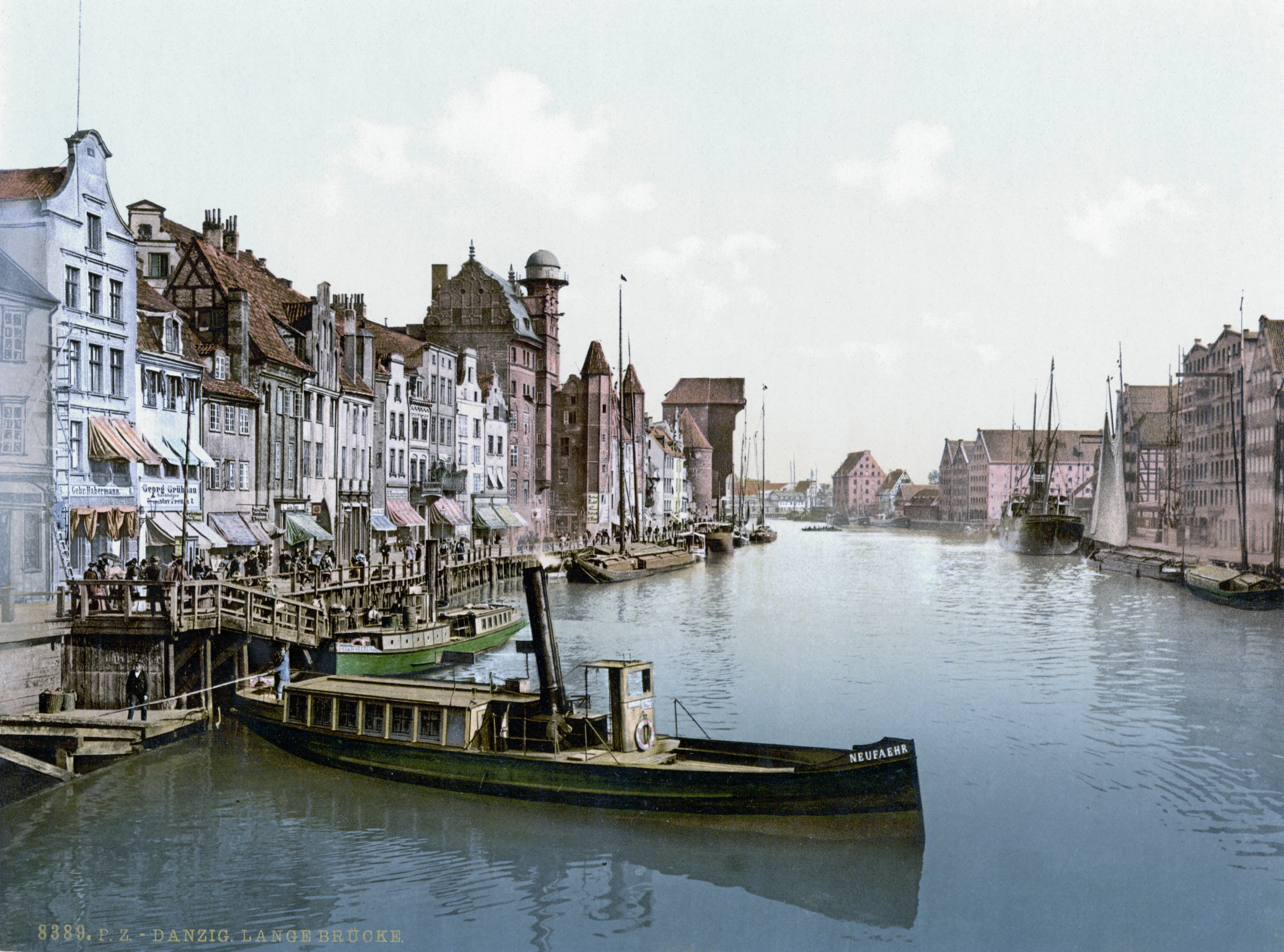
Photochrome print from around 1900

== 20th century ==
=== 1900–1939 ===
- 1901
  - Königliche Staatsarchiv für Westpreussen (National Archives) opens.
  - House of the Sheriffs restored.
- 1903 - Fußball Club Danzig formed.
- 1904 - Königliche Technische Hochschule founded.
- 1905 - Population: 159,088.
- 1918 - City becomes part of Weimar Germany.
- 1919 - Free City of Danzig created by Treaty of Versailles.

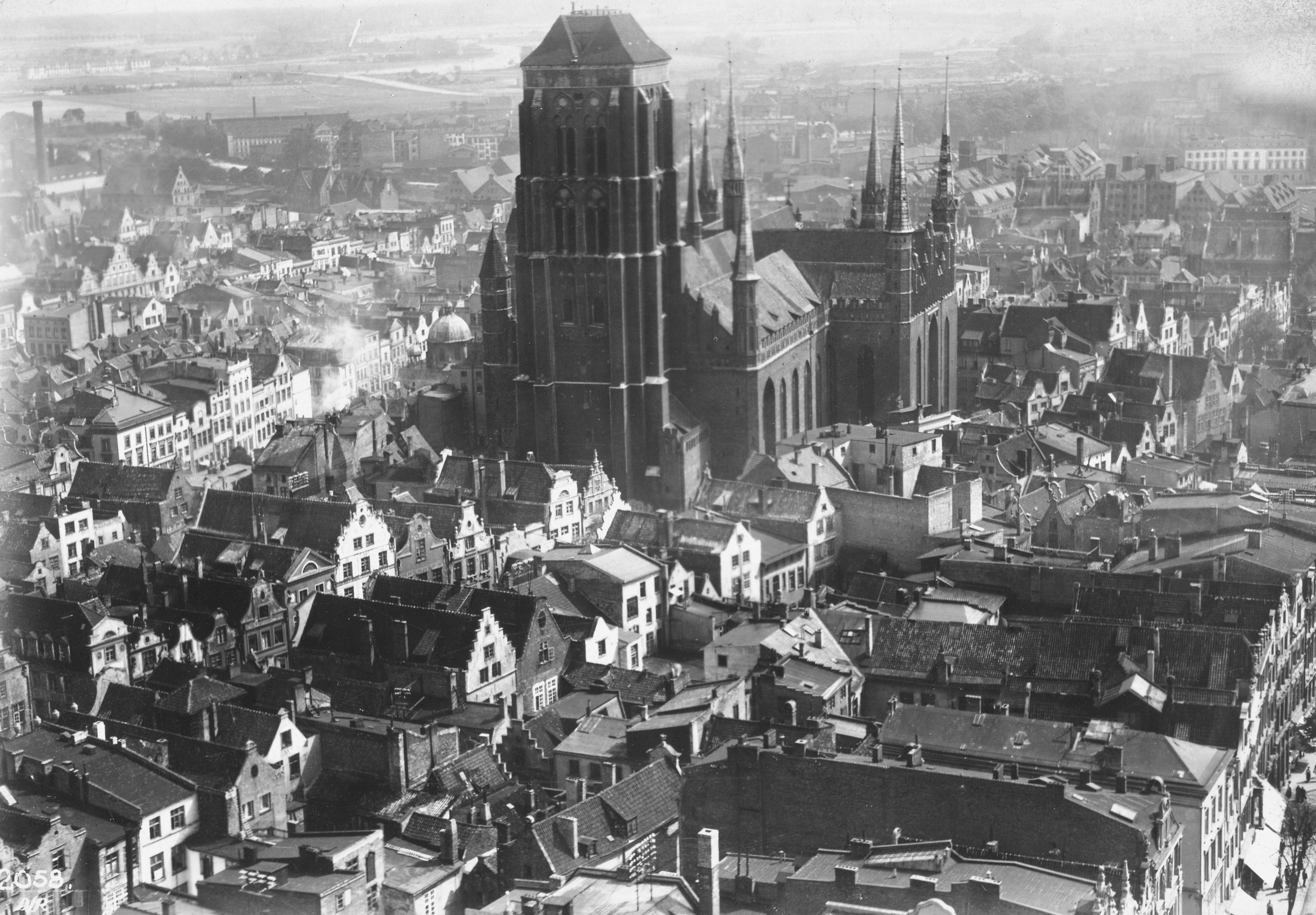
Aerial photo from circa 1920, showing St. Mary's Church

- 1920
  - Polish Post Office and Sportverein Schutzpolizei Danzig established.
  - Volkstag (parliament) becomes active.
- 1921 - Danziger Werft in business.
- 1922 - Gedania Danzig football club formed.
- 1927 - MOSiR Stadium built.
- 1933 - Statue of King Augustus III of Poland removed from the Artus Court.
- 1937
  - Mass anti-Polish discrimination by Germans: employing Poles by German companies prohibited, already employed Poles fired.
  - October: Pogrom against Jews by the Germans.
- 1938, May 3: Over 100 German attacks on Polish homes on the day of the Polish 3 May Constitution Day.
- 1939
  - March: Ban and mass requisition of Polish press.
  - SS Heimwehr Danzig and SS Wachsturmbann "Eimann" units of the SS established by the Germans.

=== World War II (1939–1945) ===
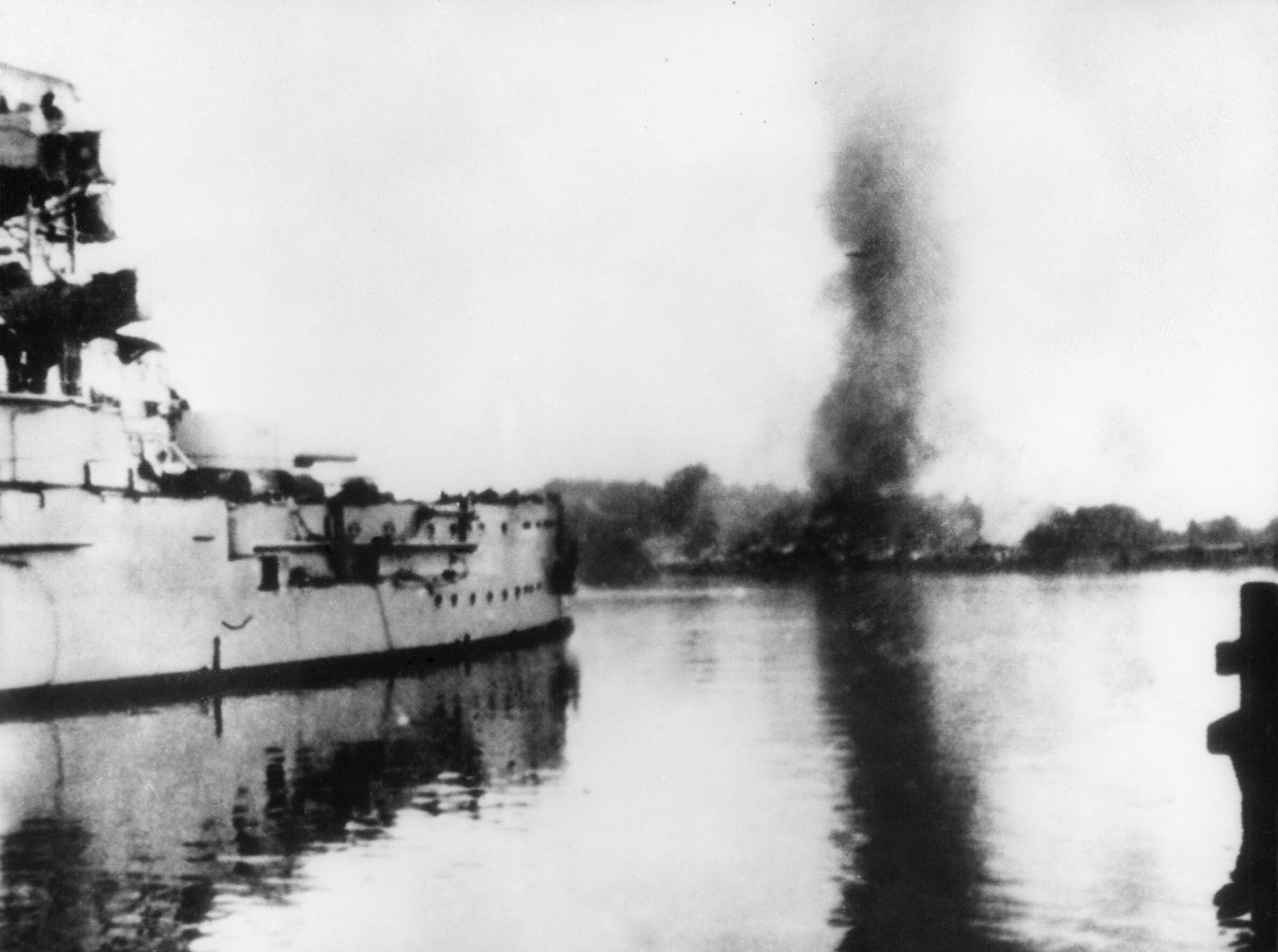
German battleship SMS Schleswig-Holstein firing at the Polish Military Transit Depot during the battle of Westerplatte in September 1939

- 1939
  - September 1: Battle of the Danzig Bay; Defense of the Polish Post Office in Danzig.
  - September 1–7: Battle of Westerplatte.
  - September: The Germans established a subcamp of the Stutthof concentration camp in the present-day neighborhood of Maćkowy.
  - October 5: The Germans executed 39 Polish defenders of the Polish Post Office in the present-day district of Zaspa.
  - October 8: City occupied by Nazi Germany; city becomes capital of Reichsgau Danzig-West Prussia.
  - October: The Germans established a Nazi camp for Romani people.
- 1940
  - The Germans established a forced labour subcamp of the Stalag XX-A prisoner-of-war camp in Biskupia Górka, initially for Polish POWs, and later mostly for French POWs.
  - Subcamp of the Stalag XX-A POW camp redesignated as a subcamp of the Stalag XX-B POW camp.
  - The Germans established two subcamps of the Stutthof concentration camp in Westerplatte and Suchanino.
  - The Germans established a subcamp of the Stalag XX-B POW camp for Allied POWs in VII Dwór.
- 1941
  - Lufttwaffensportverein Danzig formed.
  - The subcamps of the Stutthof concentration camp in Maćkowy and Westerplatte were dissolved.
- 1943–1944 - The local Polish resistance movement facilitated escapes of endangered Polish resistance members and British prisoners of war who fled from German POW camps via the city's port to neutral Sweden.
- 1944
  - August 26: The Germans established a subcamp of the Stutthof concentration camp at the main shipyard.
  - August 27: AGSSt 32 and 33 assembly centers for Allied POWs established in the city by the Germans (later relocated).
  - September 13: The Germans established a subcamp of the Stutthof concentration camp at the Schichau shipyard.
  - October 16: The Germans established a subcamp of the Stutthof concentration camp on the Ostrów Island.
  - October 18: Dulag 154 transit POW camp evacuated from Tapa in German-occupied Estonia to Gdańsk by the Germans.

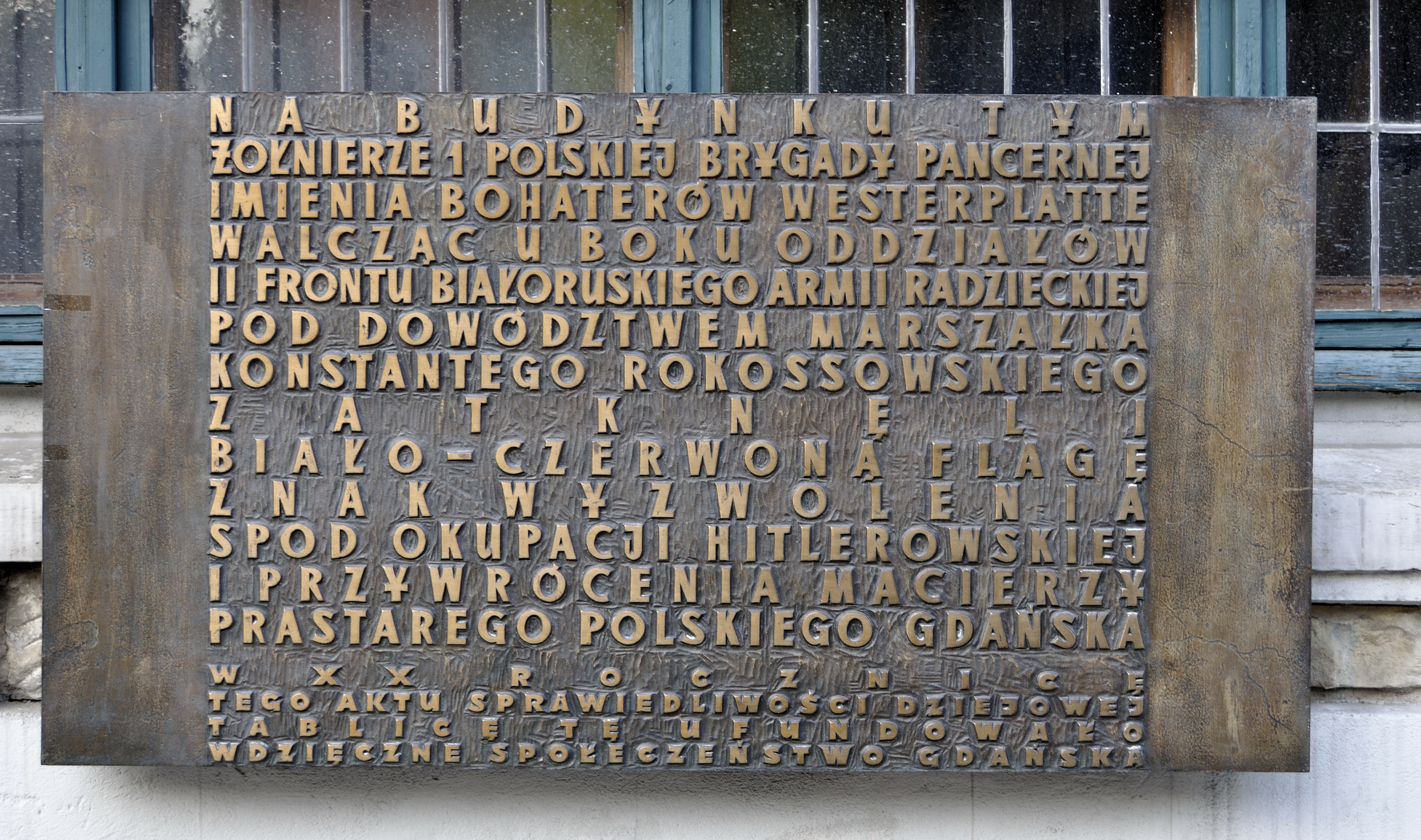
Plaque commemorating the raising of the Polish flag by soldiers of the Polish 1st Warsaw Armoured Brigade at the Artus Court and the return of Gdańsk to Poland in 1945

- 1945
  - February: Most prisoners of the Schichau subcamp of the Stutthof concentration camp were evacuated towards Lębork, while some were sent back to Stutthof main camp; subcamp dissolved.
  - March: The subcamps of the Stutthof concentration camp at the main shipyard and Ostrów Island were dissolved.
  - March 27–30: City taken by Polish and Soviet forces.
  - March 28: Polish flag raised atop Artus Court by soldiers of the Polish 1st Armoured Brigade.
  - Gdańsk becomes part of Republic of Poland.

=== 1945–1990s ===
- 1945
  - City becomes capital of Gdańsk Voivodeship.
  - Franciszek Kotus-Jankowski becomes mayor.
  - Gdańsk Shipyard, Akademia Lekarska, Baltia Gdańsk (Lechia Gdańsk) and Stoczniowiec Gdańsk football clubs, Gdańsk Symphony Orchestra, and Academy of Fine Arts established.
  - Młodzież Wszechpolska Polish anti-communist resistance organization founded.
- 1945-1946 Expulsion of the city's German-speaking majority in accordance with the Potsdam Agreement.
- 1946
  - Victoria Polish anti-communist resistance organization founded.
  - August 28: Execution of Danuta Siedzikówna and Feliks Selmanowicz, members of the Polish resistance movement in World War II and the anti-communist resistance movement, Polish national heroes, by the communists.
  - October 1: Gdańsk College of Education established.
- 1948 - Młoda Polska I (Young Poland I) Polish youth anti-communist resistance organization founded.
- 1949
  - Four transports of Greeks and Macedonians, refugees of the Greek Civil War, arrived at the port of Gdańsk, from where they were transported to new homes in Poland.
  - Szczerb and Związek Polski Niepodległej (Association of Independent Poland) Polish anti-communist resistance organizations founded.
- 1950
  - January: Młode Pokolenie Walczy (The Young Generation Fights) Polish anti-communist resistance organization founded.
  - July: Ludzie spod Znaku Trójkąta (People Under the Sign of the Triangle) Polish anti-communist resistance organization founded.
  - Konspiracyjny Związek Patriotów Polskich (Underground Union of Polish Patriots) Polish anti-communist resistance organization founded.
- 1951 - Wybrzeże Gdańsk handball team established.

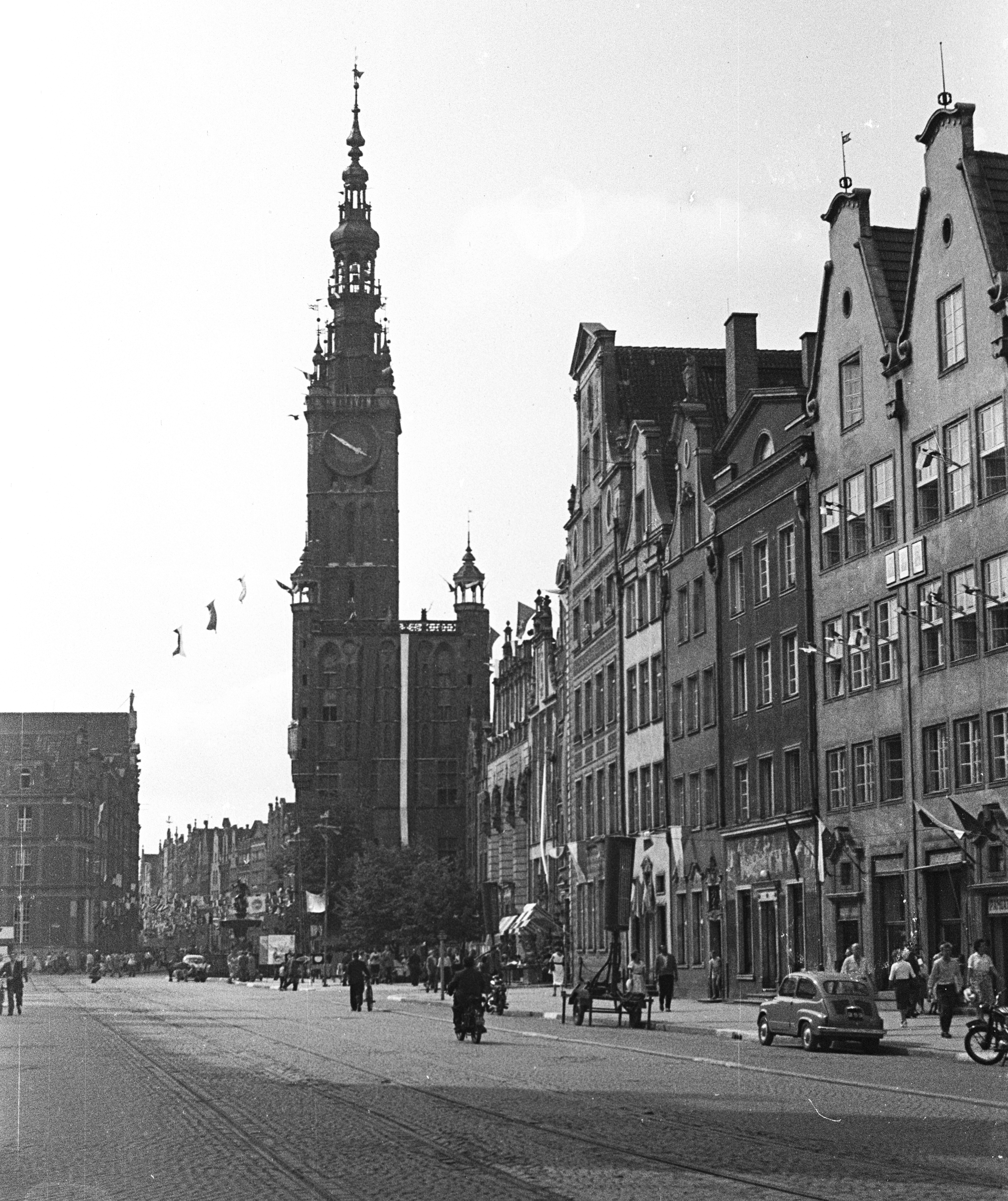
Długi Targ and Main Town Hall in the 1950s

- 1952
  - Gdańsk Zaspa, Gdańsk Przymorze-Uniwersytet and Gdańsk Politechnika railway stations opened.
  - November: Związek Walki Młodych "Przyszłość" ("Future" Youth Combat Union) Polish anti-communist resistance organization founded.
  - Tajna Organizacja Patyków (Secret Organization of Sticks) Polish anti-communist resistance organization founded.
- 1953
  - Baltic State Opera and Philharmonic formed.
  - Stoczniowiec Gdańsk ice hockey team established.
- 1954 - Antykomunistyczny Związek Młodzieży Polskiej (Anti-Communist Union of Polish Youth) resistance organization founded.
- 1956
  - 1 May: Lechia Gdańsk rugby union team established.
  - Manifestation of support for the Hungarian Revolution of 1956. Mass raising of funds, medical supplies and blood donation for Hungarian insurgents.
- 1957 - Wybrzeże Gdańsk motorcycle speedway team established.
- 1960 - Lechia Gdańsk wins its first Polish rugby championship.
- 1962 - National Maritime Museum established.
- 1963 - Gdańsk hosts the 1963 World Fencing Championships.
- 1965 - Abbot's Palace rebuilt.
- 1966
  - Wybrzeże Gdańsk wins its first Polish handball championship.
  - Westerplatte Monument unveiled.
- 1970
  - University of Gdańsk established.
  - Gdańsk Power Station commissioned.
  - Hala Olivia arena opens.

Gdańsk in 1972

- 1972 - National Museum, Gdańsk established.
- 1974
  - Airport opens.
  - Population: 402,200.
- 1975 - Gdańsk Żabianka railway station opened.
- 1977 - Monument of Polish poet Maria Konopnicka unveiled.
- 1979
  - Museum of the Polish Post (Muzeum Poczty Polskiej) established at the site of the 1939 defence of the Polish Post Office.
  - Defenders of the Polish Post Office Monument unveiled.
- 1980
  - August 14: Beginning of the strike at the Gdańsk Shipyard; Strike Committee established.
  - August 15: Strike expands to the Gdynia Shipyard, ports and public transport in the Tricity. The communist authorities cut off telephone links between the coast and the rest of Poland.
  - August 16: Inter-Enterprise Strike Committee established.
  - August 23: First issue of Strajkowy Biuletyn Informacyjny Solidarność ("Solidarity Strike Information Bulletin") published.
  - August 31: Solidarity (Polish trade union) founded; Gdańsk Agreement signed.
  - Monument to the Fallen Shipyard Workers of 1970 unveiled.
- 1982 - August 31: Anti-government demonstration.
- 1983 - Father Eugeniusz Dutkiewicz SAC Hospice founded.
- 1985 - SS Soldek museum opens.
- 1989 - City becomes part of Republic of Poland.

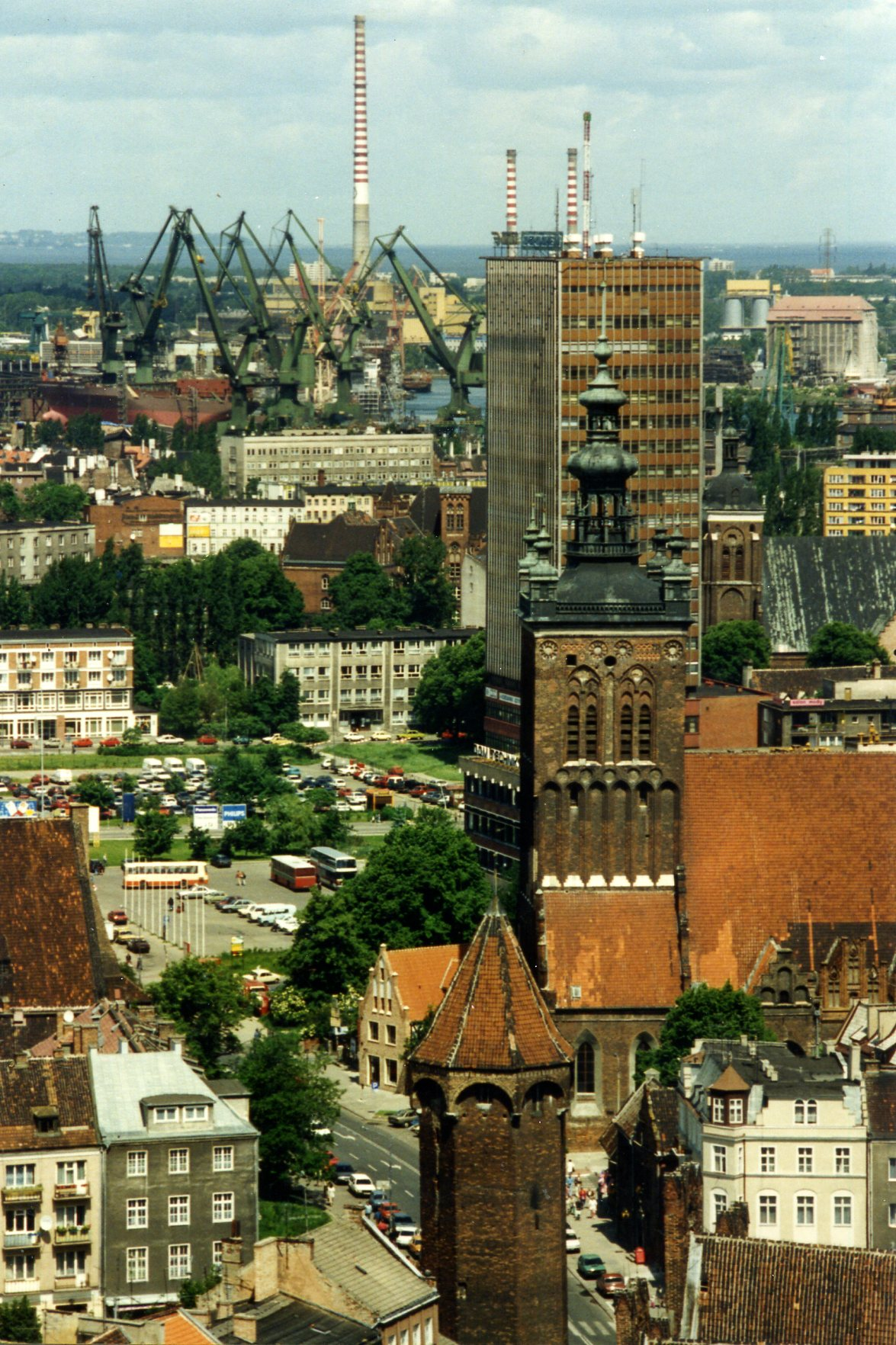
Old Town with the Gdańsk Shipyard in the background in the 1990s

- 1991 - Franciszek Jamroż becomes mayor.
- 1993 - Gdańsk Shakespeare Days begin.
- 1994
  - May: Gdańsk hosts the 1994 European Judo Championships.
  - July: Tomasz Posadzki becomes mayor.
- 1996 - International Festival of Street & Open-Air Theatres begins (approximate date).
- 1997 - Gdańsk hosts the 1997 European Fencing Championships.
- 1998
  - Paweł Adamowicz becomes mayor.
  - Łaźnia Centre for Contemporary Art founded.
- 1999
  - Gdańsk becomes capital of Pomeranian Voivodeship.
  - Solidarity Centre Foundation established.

== 21st century ==
- 2001
  - A flood occurs, killing 4 people.
  - Wybrzeże Gdańsk wins its tenth Polish handball championship.
  - Third Millennium John Paul II Bridge opens.
- 2002
  - The Monument Cemetery of the Lost Cemeteries installed.
  - Lechia Gdańsk wins its tenth Polish rugby championship.
- 2004 - May 1: Poland becomes part of European Union.
- 2005 - Trefl Gdańsk volleyball team established.
- 2007
  - Deepwater Container Terminal Gdańsk launched.
  - Tricity Charter signed.

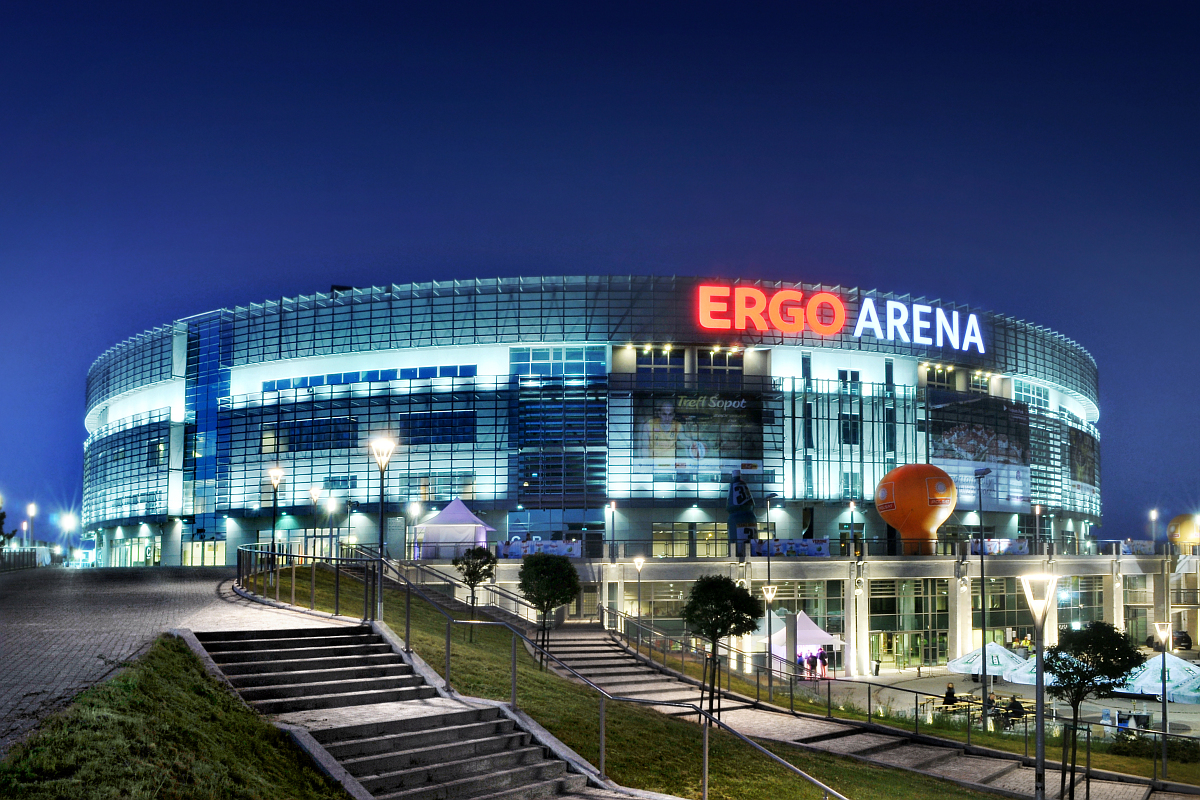
Ergo Arena

- 2009
  - September: Gdańsk co-hosts the EuroBasket 2009.
  - 7 October: Khachkar unveiled (see also: Armenians in Poland).
- 2010
  - Ergo Arena opens.
  - Population: 455,830.
- 2011
  - July: City hosts the final round of the 2011 FIVB Volleyball World League.
  - August: Baltic Arena opens.
  - October: Gdańsk hosts the 2011 European Table Tennis Championships.
- 2012 - Gdańsk co-hosts the UEFA Euro 2012.
- 2013 - Gdańsk co-hosts the 2013 Men's European Volleyball Championship.
- 2014
  - August: European Solidarity Centre opens.
  - September: Gdańsk co-hosts the 2014 FIVB Volleyball Men's World Championship.
  - September: Gdańsk Shakespeare Theatre opens.
- 2015
  - April 1: Gdańsk Śródmieście railway station opened.
  - August 30: Monument of Danuta Siedzikówna unveiled in the Orunia district.
  - December: Honorary Consulate of Bulgaria opened.

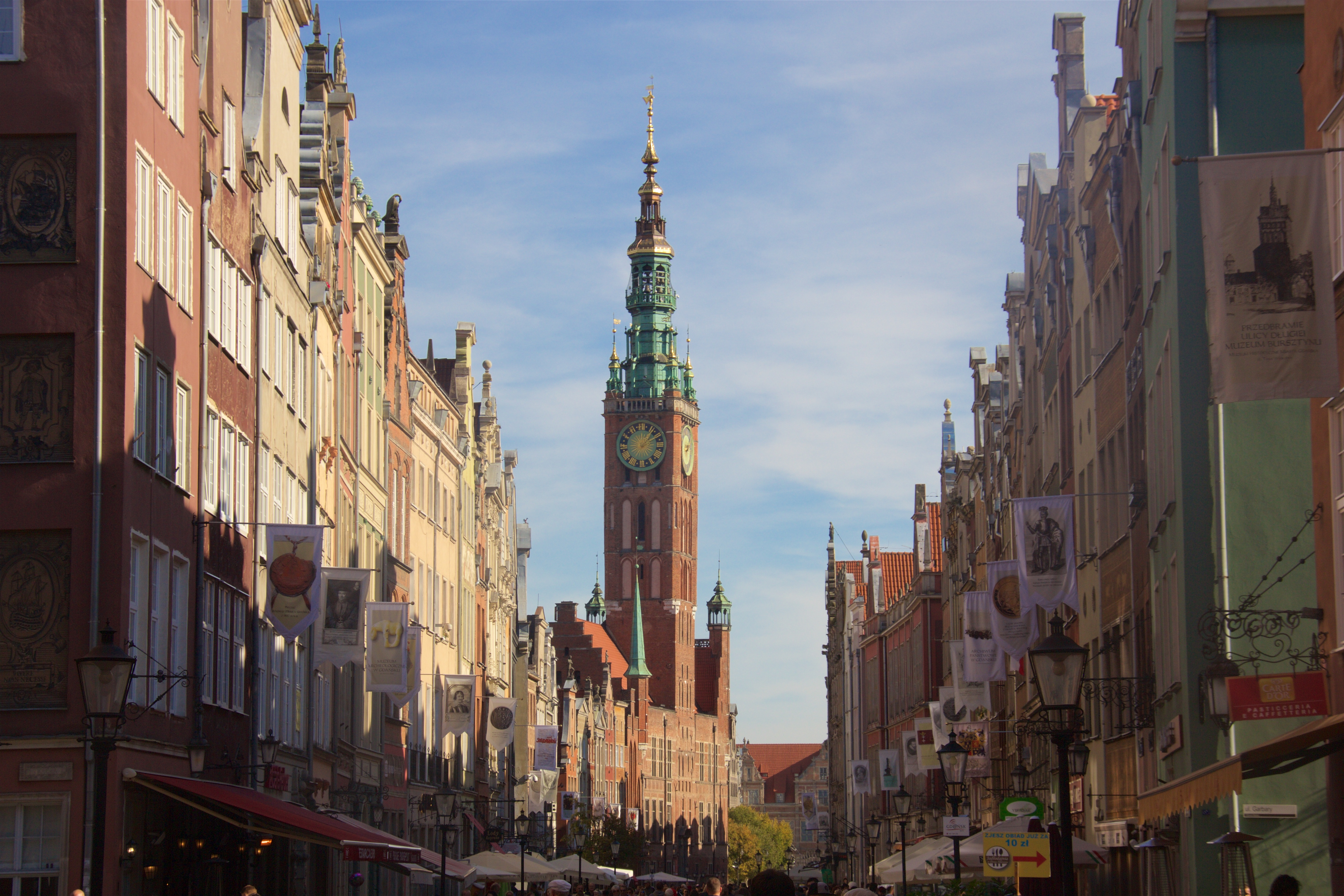
Ulica Długa in 2015

- 2016
  - January: Gdańsk co-hosts the 2016 European Men's Handball Championship.
  - August 28: State burial of Polish national heroes Danuta Siedzikówna and Feliks Selmanowicz in the 70th anniversary of their execution.
- 2017
  - March: Museum of the Second World War opened.
  - Gdańsk co-hosts the 2017 Men's European Volleyball Championship.
- 2018 - Cursed soldiers monument unveiled.
- 2019
  - 10 May: Monument to the victims of the Ponary massacre unveiled.
  - 17 September: Witold Pilecki monument unveiled.

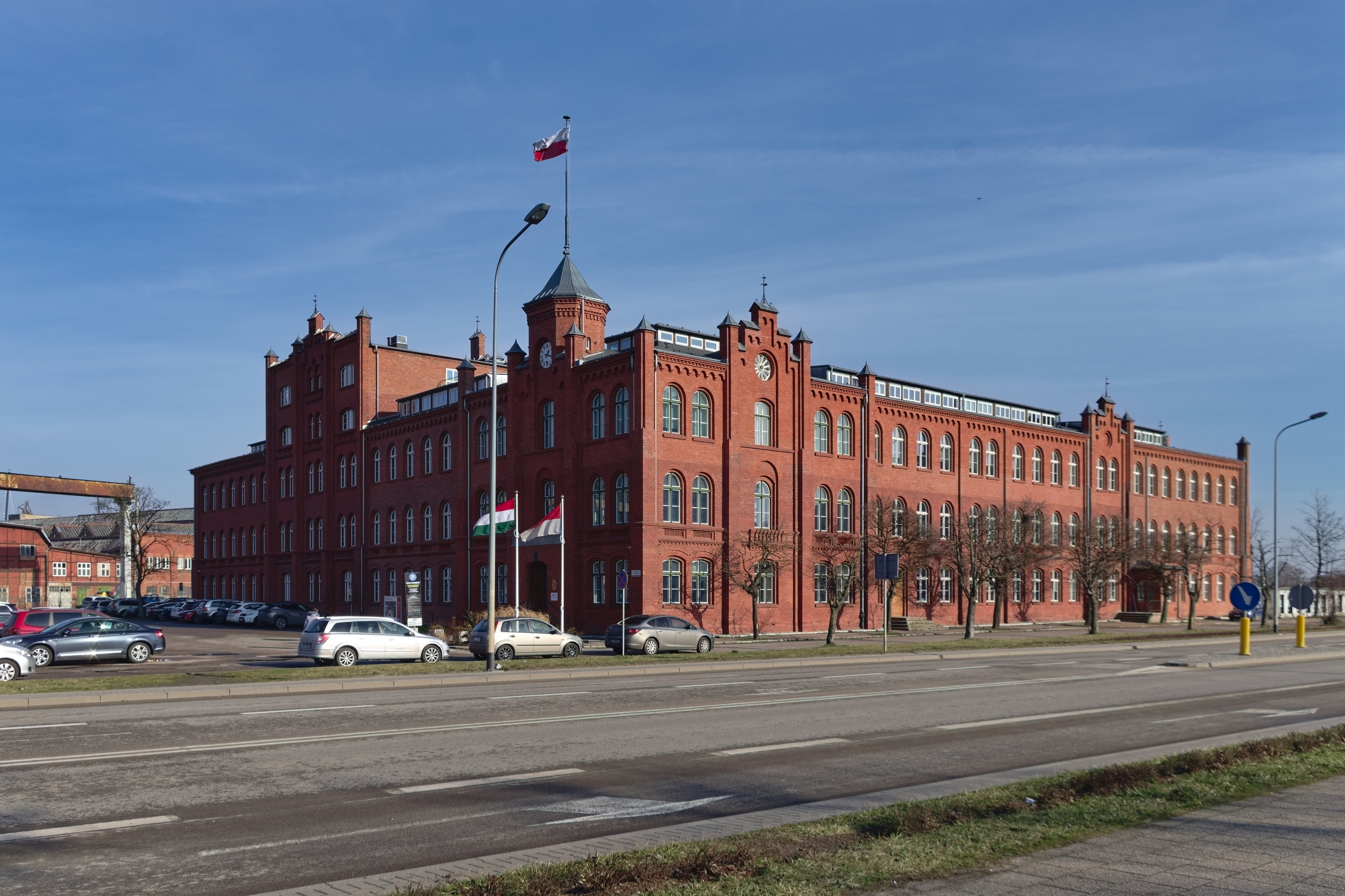
Consulate General of Hungary

- 2020
  - June: Medieval Pietas Domini altar, stolen by Germany during World War II, restored from Berlin to the St. Mary's Church in Gdańsk.
  - 22 October: Consulate-General of Hungary opened.
- 2021 - Gdańsk co-hosts the 2021 Men's European Volleyball Championship.
- 2023
  - January: Gdańsk co-hosts the 2023 World Men's Handball Championship.
  - July: Gdańsk hosts the final round of the 2023 FIVB Volleyball Men's Nations League.

== See also ==
- History of Gdańsk
- List of mayors of Danzig, 1308 to 1945
- List of mayors of Gdańsk, pre-1308 and post-1945
- List of Gdańsk aristocratic families
- Category:Timelines of cities in Poland (in Polish)

== Bibliography ==
=== In English ===
- Thomas Bartlett (1841). "Dantzic". New Tablet of Memory; or, Chronicle of Remarkable Events. London: Thomas Kelly.
- "Danzig", Jewish Encyclopedia, vol. 4, New York, 1907, hdl:2027/osu.32435029752912
- "Danzig", Northern Germany (15th ed.), Leipzig: Karl Baedeker, 1910, OCLC 78390379
- "Danzig" . Encyclopædia Britannica. Vol. 7 (11th ed.). 1910. pp. 824–825.
- Szymon Askenazy (1921), Dantzig & Poland, London: G. Allen & Unwin, Ltd., OCLC 2181707, OL 6638482M
- "Historic Danzig: Last of the City-States", National Geographic Magazine, vol. 76, Washington DC, 1939
- "Poland: Gdansk", Eastern and Central Europe (17th ed.), Fodor's, 1996, OL 7697674M
- George Lerski (1996). "Gdansk". Historical Dictionary of Poland, 966-1945. Greenwood. ISBN 978-0-313-03456-5.
- Piotr Wróbel (1998). "Gdansk". Historical Dictionary of Poland 1945-1996. Fitzroy Dearborn. ISBN 978-1-135-92694-6.

=== In other languages ===
- Johannes Bolte (1895), Das Danziger Theater im 16. und 17. Jahrhundert [Danzig Theatre in the 16th and 17th Centuries] (in German), Hamburg: L. Voss, OL 23292860M
- Max Foltz (1912), Geschichte des Danziger Stadthaushalts [History of the Danzig City Budget] (in German), Danzig: A.W. Kafemann, OCLC 12495569, OL 6557575M
- P. Krauss und E. Uetrecht, ed. (1913). "Danzig". Meyers Deutscher Städteatlas [Meyer's Atlas of German Cities] (in German). Leipzig: Bibliographisches Institut.
- Górski, Karol (1949). Związek Pruski i poddanie się Prus Polsce: zbiór tekstów źródłowych (in Polish). Poznań: Instytut Zachodni.
- Jakrzewska-Śnieżko, Zofia (1972). Dwór Artusa w Gdańsku (in Polish). Państwowe Wydawnictwo Naukowe.
- Wolfgang Adam; Siegrid Westphal, eds. (2012). "Danzig". Handbuch kultureller Zentren der Frühen Neuzeit: Städte und Residenzen im alten deutschen Sprachraum (in German). De Gruyter. pp. 275+. ISBN 978-3-11-029555-9.
