= Krenz =

Krenz is a surname. Notable people with the surname include:

- Egon Krenz (born 1937), East German politician (SED)
- Eric Krenz (1906–1931), American athlete
- Jacek Krenz (born 1948), Polish academic architect and painter
- Katarzyna Krenz (born 1953), Polish writer, poet and painter
