= Gate No. 2 of the Gdańsk Shipyard =

Entry Gate No. 2 of the Gdańsk Shipyard
- Brama nr 2 Stoczni Gdańskiej
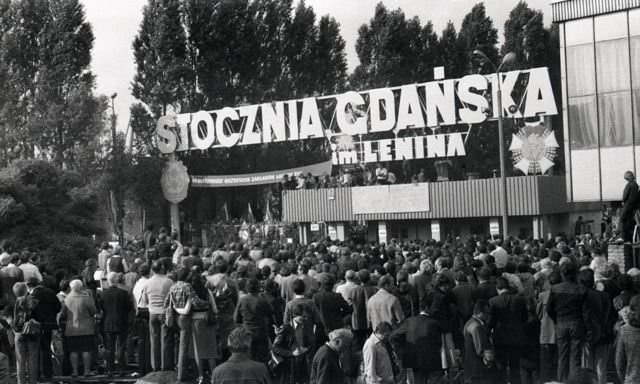
- The Gate in August 1980
- Interactive map of the Entry Gate No. 2 of the Gdańsk Shipyard area

General information
- Type: Gate
- Location: Doki 1, Gdańsk, Poland
- Coordinates: 54.360333°N 18.649722°E

The Gate No. 2 of the Gdańsk Shipyard (Brama nr 2 Stoczni Gdańskiej) is one of the gates leading into Gdańsk Shipyard. Because of the gate's proximity to the Shipyard's management buildings as well as its good access to Gdańsk Main City and Gdańsk Główny railway station, the Gate is commonly considered to be the main entrance to the Shipyard.

In 1999, the Gate was included on a list of Objects of cultural heritage in Poland for Pomeranian Voivodeship, under the signature A-1206. In 2014, it received the European Heritage Label as part of the historic complex of the Gdańsk Shipyard's buildings.

== History ==
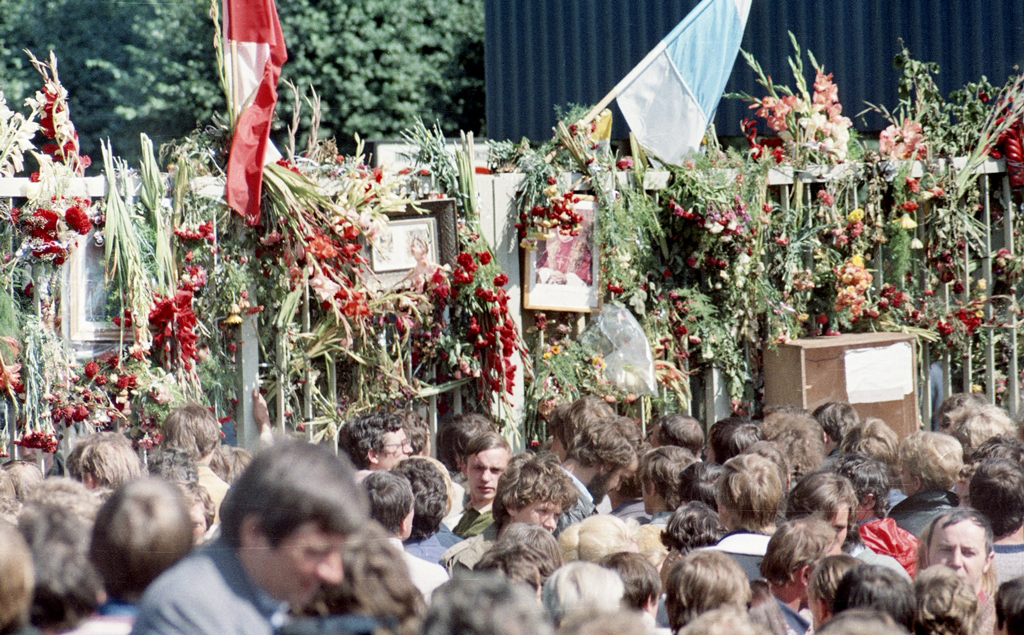
Strike decorations on the Gate No. 2 of the Lenin Shipyard, 1980

On 16 December 1970, during the Polish protests of 1970, striking shipyard workers were shot when leaving the premises of the shipyard through the gate. Two workers were killed, and 11 were injured. Before the construction of the Monument to the Fallen Shipyard Workers of 1970, the Gate was the primary commemoration place for the fallen. During the August 1980 strikes, the Gate was decorated with holy pictures and a portrait of John Paul II. Over the gate, a banner reading Proletariusze wszystkich krajów, łączcie się! (Workers of the world, unite!) was placed at the time . On 31 August 1980, Lech Wałęsa stood at the gate when he announced the end of the strike and the signing of the Gdańsk Agreement.
