= Katarzyna Krenz =

Polish writer, poet and painter (born 1953)

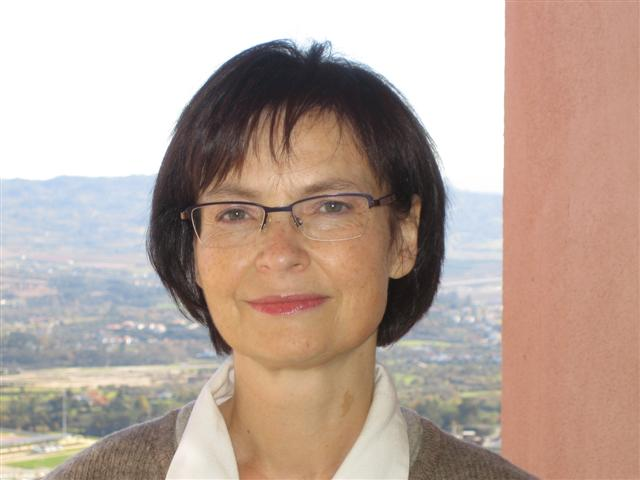
- Krenz in 2005
- Born: 24 January 1953 (age 73); Gdańsk, Poland
- Occupations: Novelist, poet, painter
- Spouse: Jacek Krenz
- Children: Marianna Lorenc, Michal Krenz
- Writing career
- Genre: Fiction

Katarzyna Krenz (born 24 January 1953) is a Polish writer, poet and painter.

== Biography ==
Krenz was born on 24 January 1953 in Gdańsk, Poland. She is best known as the author of the novels W ogrodzie Mirandy (In Miranda's Garden), Lekcja tańca (Dance Lesson), Krolowa pszczół (The Queen of Bees) and Księżyc myśliwych (Moon Hunters). A graduate from the University of Gdańsk, she is a poet, journalist and literary translator, as well as a watercolour painter. Her works have been published worldwide. Among her translations are the works of Amos Oz, John Updike and Richard Russo. From 2005 to 2014 she has lived with her husband Jacek Krenz in Portugal.

== Literary awards ==
- 2010 – I prize in XXII National Meetings of Literary Generations (Ogólnopolskie Literackie Spotkania Pokoleń). Kruszwica
- 1998 – Honorary mention in Literary Competition of Stefan Flukowski in Szczecin.

== Works ==
=== Novels ===
- Krenz K., Bielak J. Księżyc myśliwych. ZNAK Kraków ISBN 978-83-240-4046-9 (2015)
- Królowa pszczół, Wydawnictwo Literackie, Kraków ISBN 978-83-08-04700-2 (2011)
- Lekcja tańca, Wydawnictwo Literackie, Kraków ISBN 978-83-08-04338-7 (2009)
- Kropla ochry, dwie krople pamięci.
- W ogrodzie Mirandy, Wydawnictwo Literackie, Kraków, ISBN 978-83-08-04161-1 (2008)

=== Poetry ===
- Poezine 01-06 Quincunx i kostka domino, artbook, Ogarnij Miasto Sp. z o.o. Gdańsk, ISBN 978-83-946395-5-6 (2018)
- Watermarks. poetry & watercolours., Kasia Krenz & Jacek Krenz, ISBN 972-8790-50-3
  - Museu de Lanifícios. Covilha, Portugal (2006)
  - Old Market House Arts Centre. Dungarvan, Ireland (2006)
- Szukam cię, morze, ISBN 83-922169-2-X Gdańsk/Łeba (2005)
- Katarzyna Krenz, Czesław Tumielewicz, Seaside Evening / Wieczór nad morzem, Gdańsk-Łeba ISBN 83-922169-1-1 (2005)
- Kartki z podróży do Łeby (with Ewa Marią Slaska) Gdańsk ISBN 83-88487-87-6 (2001)
- Z nieznajomą w podróży. Tower Press, Gdańsk ISBN 83-87342-22-X (2000)
- La Tour, Degnodiverso, Turin, Italy (1999)

=== Non-fiction ===
- Marcus de la Poer Beresford and Katarzyna Krenz. From Napoleon to the Nazis: The Mysterious Story of Marshal Beresford’s Silver / Od Napoleona do nazistów: Tajemnicza historia sreber marszałka Beresforda. ISBN 978-1-7391497-1-0 Dungarvan, Co. Waterford (2023)
- The Eye of Abstraction. World in the Paintings of Professor Tadeusz Kielanowski / Oko abstrakcji. Świat w obrazach Profesora Tadeusza Kielanowskiego. Domena, Warsaw, ISBN 978-83-938166-8-2 (2020)
