= Danzig law =

Self chosen laws of Danzig, Germany

Danzig law (German: Danziger Willkür; in Polish: Gdański Wilkierz) was the official set of records of the self chosen laws of the city of Danzig (Gdańsk). In German, Willkür literally means creation by free will, thus self made laws and self chosen rulers unlike those that were Pflicht, a duty imposed by outside powers. For example it included the right to elect a mayor, or mayors, as initially there were separate Rechtstadt, Altstadt, Jungstadt settlements, literally law town, old town, young town. In effect since the 1300s to various degrees, it was codified in 1455 for recognition by the King of Poland, and remained until 1853, decades after Danzig became part of the Kingdom of Prussia.

== History ==
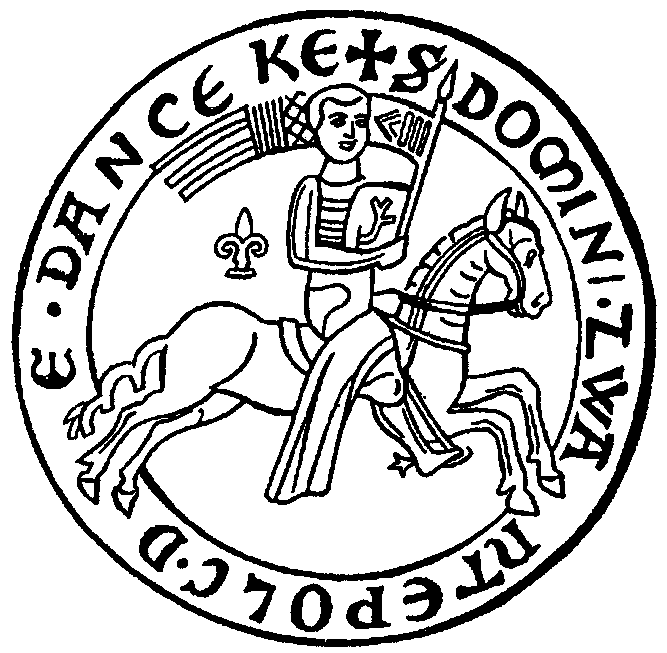
Seal of Zwantepolc de Danceke, 1228

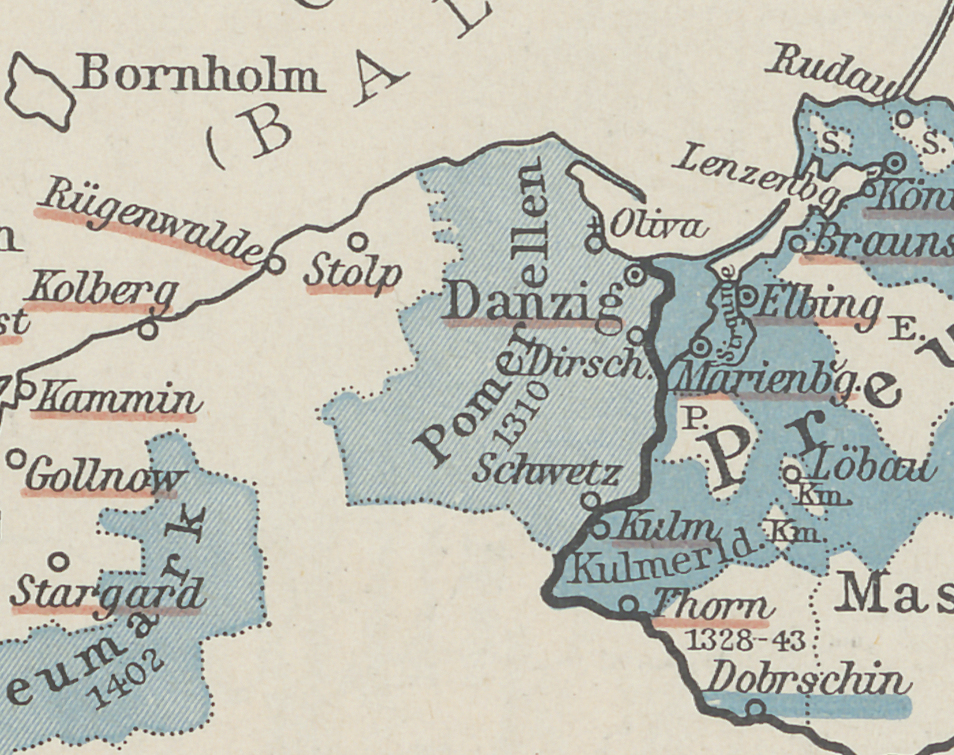
Danzig while part of the monastic state of the Teutonic Knights

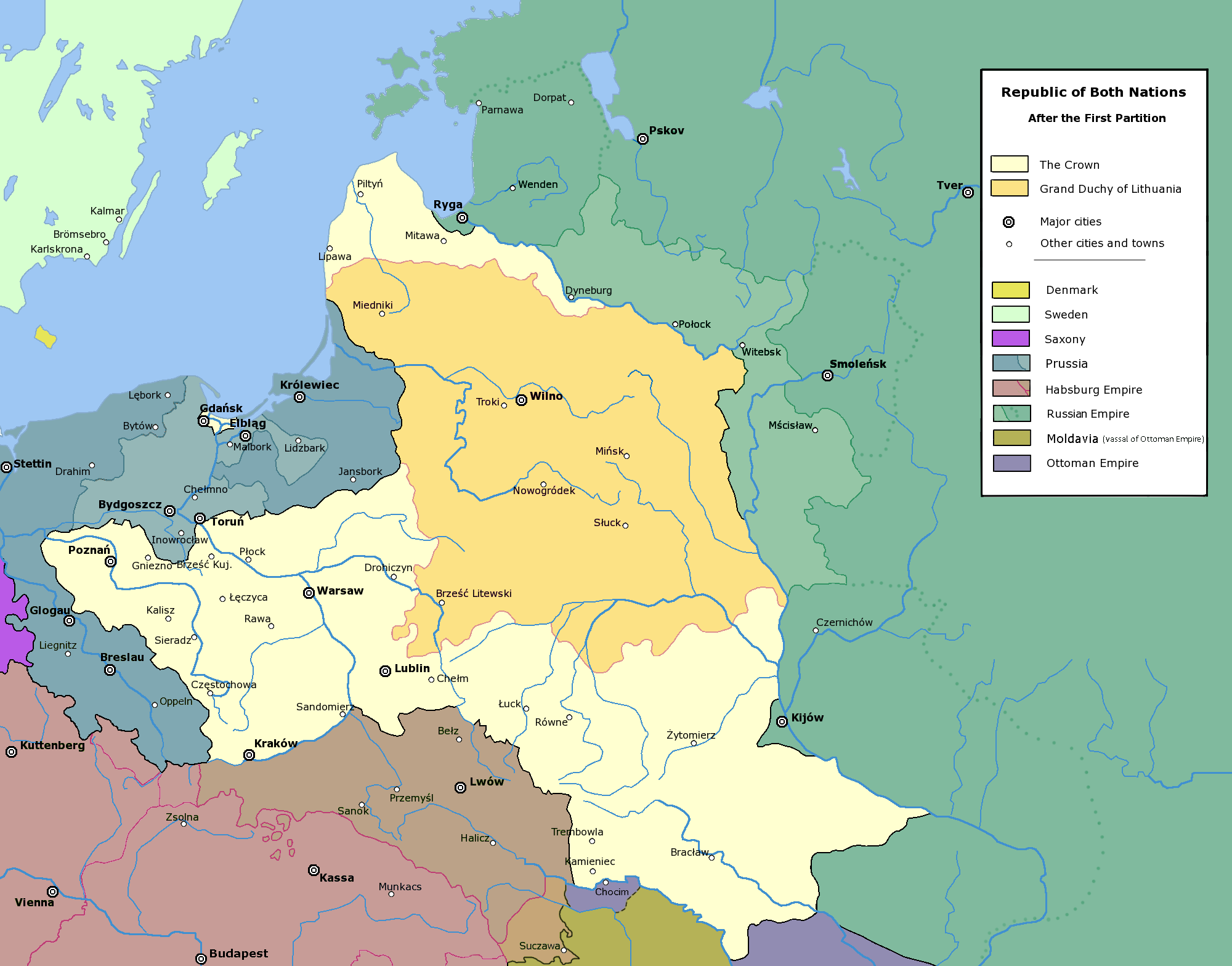
Danzig not affected by the First Partition of Poland (1772)

The models for the Danzig Law were the statute books of the Holy Roman Empire and of other Hanseatic League cities, especially Lübeck. The merchant city received Lübeck law in 1226.

After the State of the Teutonic Order existed for about two centuries, it imposed high taxes after the Peace of Thorn (1411), and the Prussian Confederation was founded to oppose the policy of the Teutonic Order, eventually triggering the Thirteen Years' War and a split of Prussian lands into a still Teutonic, later Ducal and Eastern part, and a somewhat autonomous part that, in order to secure autonomy, allied with the Polish king, called Royal, or Western. During that time, Danzig continued with its own set of law system, with its self-government. The recognition of this law, and other Danzig's privileges, by the King of Poland was a prerequisite for allying with him resp. subjecting as Royal Prussia to his overlordship. The Second Peace of Thorn of 1466 confirmed the rights. When they were in danger in the 1570s, it led to the Danzig rebellion and the Siege of Danzig (1577) after which the new Polish king re-confirmed the city's special status and its Danzig law privileges.

In the First Partition of Poland in 1772, the Kingdom of Prussia took over Royal Prussia (but not yet Danzig and Thorn (Toruń)) and called it West Prussia. The Latin names Prussia Orientalis and Prussia Occidentalis were for centuries prior used for both parts (East and West) of Prussia. Danzig continued its self-government for two decades to come, then in 1793 was annexed by the Kingdom of Prussia, was Free City of Danzig (Napoleonic) (1807–1814), until its Prussian Danzig Law codes were supplanted by standardized Prussian Westpreußisches Provinzialrecht in 1853. The town was Free City of Danzig again from 1920 to 1939.

=== Danziger Willkür ===
There were several incarnations of the laws that mainly covered internal government:

- 1435–1448 (draft)
- 1455 first known written form
- 1479–1500
- 1574 during succession dispute leading to the Siege of Danzig (1577)
- 1597 Der See- und Handelstadt Dantzig Rechte oder Willkür ("The Laws of the Sea and Trade City of Danzig")
- 1678 (draft)
- 1732 re-print of the 1597 Danzig Laws, by Seelmann, Danzig
- 1761

=== Danziger privilege ===
The privileges of Danzig confirmed rights of Danzig in external relations, like trading, coinage, and since 1454, with the Polish Crown.

Danzig had a special status, due to its large population (in 1772 47,600 inside the city walls, 35,000 to 40,000 outside), its harbour and wealth. Some of its politicians maintained that it was loyal only to the King of Poland, claiming that its status was similar to an Imperial Free City. This position was never accepted by the Sejm. Modern German author compare it to status of Marseille in 16th and 17th century towards the French King.

=== Historians ===
Already in the 17th century, local historians studied the history of Danzig law, such as Elias Constantius von Treuen-Schroeder (1625–1680) and Johann Ernst von der Linde (1651–1721). They did not publish, but Gottfried Lengnich acknowledged their work in the foreword to his Ius publicum civitatis Gedanensis oder der Stadt Danzig Verfassung und Rechte (Public law of the city of Danzig, or the city's constitution and rights, 1769). Lengnich wanted to find out whether "us Prussians ... are the Poles equal brothers or their servants" and encouraged others to study local history, too. Among others Michael Christoph Hanow, Georg Daniel Seyler and David Braun studied the history of their home towns.

== See also ==
- History of Gdańsk
- Free City of Danzig (Napoleonic)
- Free City of Danzig, and its laws

== Literature ==
- Des Syndicus der Stadt Danzig Gottfried Lengnich ius publicum civitatis Gedanensis oder der Stadt Danzig Verfassung und Rechte, 1769, published by Otto Günther, Danzig 1900 (initially only intended for internal use within city administration)
- Paul Simson: Geschichte der Danziger Willkür. Quellen und Darstellungen zur Geschichte Westpreußens Nr. 3. Danzig 1904 . Reprint: Nicolaus-Copernicus-Verlag, Münster 2006, ISBN 978-3-924238-36-0.
- Hans-Jürgen Bömelburg, Zwischen polnischer Ständegesellschaft und preussischem Obrigkeitsstaat: Vom Königlichen Preußen zu Westpreußen (1756–1806) 1995, Oldenbourg Wissenschaftsverlag Prussia (Germany), ISBN 3-486-56127-8
