= Battle of Lubieszów =

1577 battle between Polish–Lithuanian Commonwealth and the city of Gdańsk

Coordinates: 54°05′22″N 18°42′20″E

Battle of Lubiszewo
- Part of War of the Gdańsk Rebellion
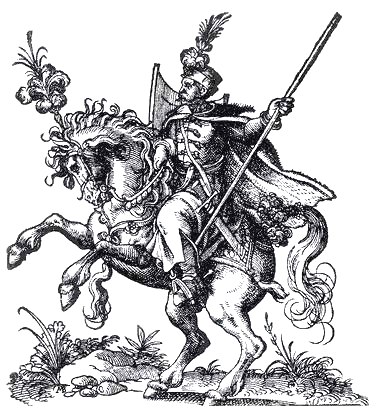
- Commonwealth Hussar
Date	17 April 1577
Location	Lubiszewo Tczewskie (near Gdańsk)
Result	Polish–Lithuanian victory

Belligerents
Polish–Lithuanian Commonwealth; Principality of Transylvania	(Free City of Danzig) Danzig

Commanders and leaders
(Polish–Lithuanian Commonwealth) Jan Zborowski	(Free City of Danzig) Johann Winkelbruch

Strength
1,450 cavalry 1,050 infantry and artillery	10,000–12,000 of which 800 were cavalry

Casualties and losses
58 killed 127 wounded	4,416-4,427 killed 1,000-5,000 captured

The Battle of Lubieszów (Battle of Lubieszów Lake), which occurred on 17 April 1577, was the most crucial battle in the two-year Danzig Rebellion fought between the forces loyal to the newly elected King Stefan Batory of the Polish–Lithuanian Commonwealth and the Commonwealth's most prosperous city, Gdańsk (Danzig in German), following the city's refusal to accept the election of Batory as monarch of the Commonwealth which had taken place on 15 December 1575. The battle took place to the west of the town of Tczew (Dirschau), southeast of Gdansk on the left bank of the Vistula River, near Lubieszów Lake (present name Lubiszewo Lake) and the modern village of Lubiszewo Tczewskie (German: Lübschau). While it was not a decisive victory insofar as Gdansk itself was not taken and the war raged on, the city, having lost much of its wealthy citizenry, did finally come to terms with the king at the end of the year.

The city's army, led by the mercenary German commander Jan Winkelbruch (Hans Winckelbruch or Winckelburg von Kölln), was about 7,000–12,000 strong (including mercenaries, among them a Scottish regiment which did not participate in the battle itself), but with less than 1,000 cavalry. The city's army was utterly defeated by the army of Jan Zborowski (of about 2,000 men, half of them cavalry). The Danzigers, who lost over half of their army to casualties and surrender, were forced to retreat behind the walls. Thus the Siege of Danzig (1577) began.

== Initial moves ==
The campaign leading up to the battle began in August 1576; Batory marched with 2,000 men to Malbork, east of Tczew, to isolate Gdańsk from the surrounding countryside. The following January, he took the town of Tczew and successively stormed the rebel defenses at Głowa and Garabina. The last of these was 15 kilometres (9 mi) from Gdańsk, and its fall to the king cut the city off by land. The king then left the army under the command of hetman Jan Zborowski, ordering a blockade to isolate the city by the sea, with Polish privateers fighting the Gdańsk and Danish fleets.

== Opposing forces ==
The winter reduced military action to minor skirmishes. The spring thaw halted all military engagements, but during this lull, the city magnates hired the German mercenary captain Hans Winckelbruch von Kölln, who, in April, marched out to engage the Polish army at Lubieszów near Tczew. The Polish army consisted of 1,000 infantry (primarily Hungarians and Wallachians) and 1,300 cavalry, while Winckelbruch's force was made up of 3,100 landsknechts, 400 mercenary reiter cavalry, 400 city cavalry, and 6,000–8,000 militiamen, in total 10–12,000 soldiers. He also brought seven cannons and 30 light cannons mounted on wagons. On hearing of Winckelbruch's advance, hetman Zborowski marched all but 100 infantry out of Tczew to attack the Gdańsk army, crossing the Motława River (a tributary of the Vistula then swollen with the spring thaw) at Rokitki, while Winckelbruch sent a force of 200 to delay the Commonwealth army as he tried to flank it and cross the Motława between two lakes to the south of Lubieszów, west southwest of Rokitki. While scouts informed Zborowski of the flanking move, two standards of cavalry he sent out to stop them could not prevent Winckelbruch's crossing. Upon hearing of the failure to dislodge Winckelbruch from his left flank, Zborowski ordered the bridge at Roktiki destroyed and sent all his forces to the west to engage Winckelbruch at the lakes.

== Battle ==
The battle started in earnest with Polish-Hungarian infantry advancing, crouching at first to avoid withering enemy fire, to capture a battery of Gdańsk artillery, which was then turned to fire on the Danzig army. Winckelbruch ordered the landsknechts to attack with pikes, but they were repelled by the king's infantry, who charged them with sabers. The landsknechts held their ground before the enemy infantry. Finally, they broke when another two companies of Polish hussars attacked them in the flank. With this, the entire Danzig army broke and fled, and the Polish cavalry kept up the chase right to the Danzig city gates. Danzig's losses amounted to 4,416-4,427 dead and 1,000-5,000 taken prisoner, while the king's army suffered 188 casualties, only 58 of them deaths.

Reports of Winkelbruch's death in the battle of 17 April proved inaccurate because he escaped only to be killed on 23 August at the Gdańsk Lighthouse fortress.

== Aftermath ==
The battle, while decisive for the king, did not end Gdańsk's resistance. The king could only reinforce his forces in June, and a raid on 3 July destroyed a third of Batory's artillery park, making a direct assault on the city, defended by heavy medieval walls, very difficult. In September, Batory withdrew his army to prepare for war with Muscovy. Both sides came to terms in December 1577, with Batory receiving an indemnity of 200,000 Polish złotys while confirming the city's liberties.

== Significance ==
Although it failed to end the wider war, the Battle of Lubieszów marks the beginning of the heyday of the Polish-Lithuanian hussars, who were so instrumental in sealing the victory that day.
