= Gdańsk Zaspa railway station =

Railway station in Gdańsk, Poland

Gdańsk Zaspa
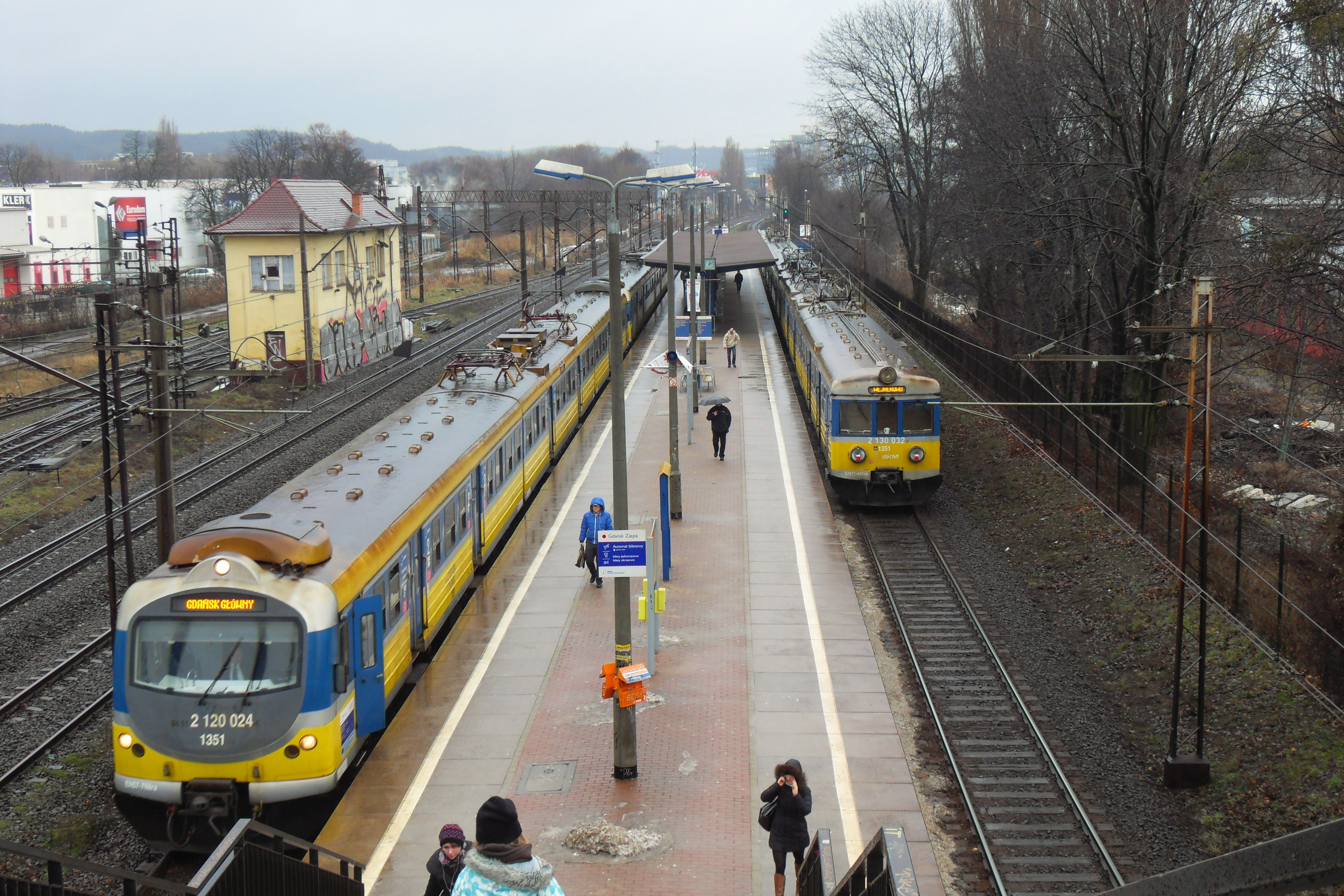

General information
- Location: Gdańsk, Pomeranian Voivodeship; Poland
- System: Railway Station
- Operator: SKM Tricity
- Line: 250: Gdańsk Śródmieście–Rumia railway
- Platforms: 2

History
- Former names: Gdańsk Lotnisko (until 1974)
Location
- Location within Poland

Gdańsk Zaspa railway station is a railway station serving the city of Gdańsk, in the Pomeranian Voivodeship, Poland. The station opened in 1952 and is located on the Gdańsk Śródmieście–Rumia railway. The train services are operated by SKM Tricity.

== History ==
The station was formerly known as Gdańsk Lotnisko (English: Gdańsk Airport) because it was the closest station to the old Wrzeszcz airport (but located a considerable distance away from the terminal). After the closure of said airport in 1974, this district of the city was developed and its name changed. The purpose of the station changed from providing connections to the airport, to serving the residents of the district.

When Pope John Paul II celebrated mass in the nearby Zaspa quarter during his 1987 pilgrimage to Gdańsk the stop played a significant role: almost a million citizens reached this location via the SKM service.

== Train services ==
The station is served by the following services:

- Szybka Kolej Miejska services (SKM) (Lębork -) Wejherowo - Reda - Rumia - Gdynia - Sopot - Gdansk

Preceding station	SKM Tricity	Following station
Gdańsk Przymorze-Uniwersytet towards Wejherowo or Lębork	SKM Tricity	Gdańsk Wrzeszcz towards Gdańsk Śródmieście
