= Jacek Krenz =

Polish academic architect and painter

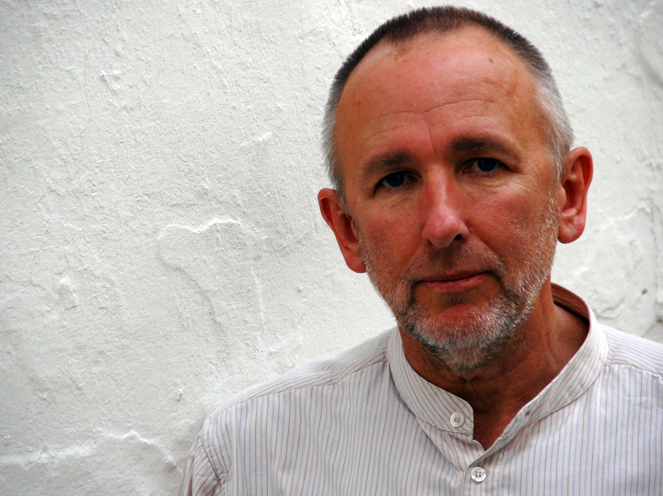
- Born: 1948 (age 77–78); Poznań, Poland
- Occupation: Architect
- Buildings: The Monument Cemetery of the Lost Cemeteries in Gdańsk PL, Church in Waglikowice, PL

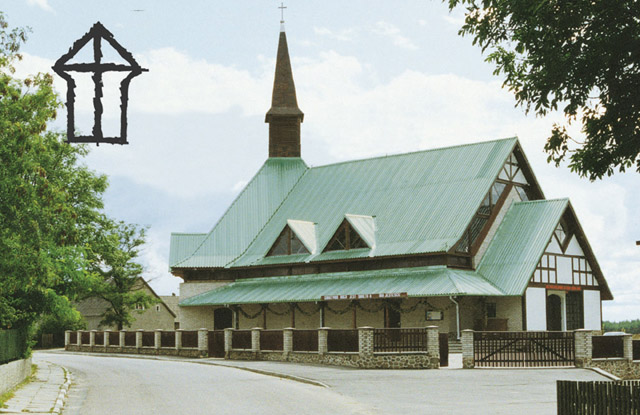
Church in Waglikowice

Jacek Krenz, born in 1948 in Poznań, Poland, is an academic architect and painter. He is a professor at Gdańsk University of Technology, Faculty of Architecture, taught also at University of Fine Arts in Poznań – both in Poland – and at Universidade da Beira Interior in Covilhã, Portugal. Charter member of The Polish Watercolour Society. Instructor of Urban Sketchers

== Architectural design ==
- Festus, Art Hotel in Sopot PL 2005
- Orphanage, with T. Mielczyński. Awarded an Honorary Mention in the competition. 2003
- The Monument Cemetery of the Lost Cemeteries in Gdańsk PL, with H. Klementowska. First Prize in the competition. Realization of the design - 2002
- Futura Leasing Ltd, new site in Gdańsk PL 2000
- Church in Waglikowice, with P. Loch, completion 1993
- Renovation of the residential and public historical buildings.
  - Bank NBP interiors Gdańsk, PL, with P. and B. Loch. Interior design.
  - The Center of Music in the Old Brewery in Kartuzy PL 2004
- Pavilion of Gdańsk at 11 Cities/11 Nations Contemporary Nordic Art and Architecture, Leeuwarden, NL 1999
- Monument to the Fallen Shipyard Workers of 1970. Gdańsk, Solidarity Place: with S. Baum and W. Mokwiński, PL 1980

He is a co-founder of the Wdzydze Artists’ Village in Kaszuby, Poland, where he works in his summer studio. As a result of several workshops and artistic journeys around Europe, his works are in numerous private, public, and corporate collections.

== Bibliography ==
- 2022: Latem w Jastarni. Region, 2022, ISBN 978-83-7591-855-7 2nd place in the Kashubian Literature Competition 2023
- 2016: Krenz J., Teixeira J. S.: Castelo Branco: akwarela & poesia. Castelo Branco: Junta de Freguesia de Castelo Branco, 2016, ISBN 978-989-99659-0-4
- 2016: Krenz J., City in my eyes. in: Sketch City: Tips and Inspiration for Drawing on Location. p. 132-145, Gingko Press Inc. 2015. ISBN 978-1584235927
- 2014: Ideogram. From Idea to Architectural Form, Covilha: Universidade da Beira Interior, ISBN 978-989-654-146-0
- 2012: Ideograms in Architecture. Between Sign and Meaning, Covilha: Universidade da Beira Interior, 2012
- 2010: Ideogramy architektury. Między znakiem a znaczeniem, Wydawnictwo Bernardinum, ISBN 978-83-7380-806-5
- 1997: Architektura znaczeń, Wydawnictwo Politechniki Gdańskiej, ISBN 83-86537-55-8

== Exhibitions of drawings and watercolours ==
- Seascapes - an exhibition of watercolours. Kino Żeglarz Jastarnia Poland. 08.07-09.08.2023
- Poziomy Abstrakcji / The Levels of Abstraction. Individual exhibition of paintings. Galeria Wnętrz City Meble. Gdansk, Poland. 3-16.06.2017
- Miejsca/Places/Lugares.Jacek Krenz, rysunek i malarstwo. Polish Baltic Philharmonic, Gdansk, Poland. 11-27.04 2016
- Paisagens, Passagens. Individual exhibition of drawings and paintings. Museu de Lanificios, Covilhã, Portugal 2014
- Jacek Krenz - Watercolours, Katarzyna Krenz - Poetry. Warzywniak Gallery. Gdansk Oliwa. 2013.
- OUVINDO CHOPIN - 3 editions in Portugal: Casa Santa Maria, Cascais, Galeria Municipal do Palácio Ribamar, Lisbon, Espaço Cultural do Chiado da Fundação Sousa Pedro. Lisbon, 2010
- Galeria de Santo António in Monchique, Portugal 2010,
- Arte e Genero in Castelo Branco, Portugal 2010,
- Casino de Lisboa in Lisbon, Portugal 2009,
- ARTE ALGARVE in Loulé, Portugal 2008,
- Palaca Milesi in Split, Croatia 2008,
- City Museum in Trogir, Croatia 2008,
- Centro Chiado in lisbon, Portugal 2008,
- Galeria Municipal in Castelo de Vide, Portugal 2007,
- Galeria Municipal in Oeiras, Portugal 2007,
- the Royal Watercolour Society’s Bankside Gallery in London 2005 and 2006.
- The Old Market House Arts Centre in Dungarvan, Ireland 2006,
- Museu de Lanifícios in Covilhã, Portugal 2006
- The Labyrinth Gallery in Kraków, Poland 2005
- The Municipal Gallery in Łeba, Poland 2005;
- Farum Kulturhus in Denmark 2005,
- The Municipal Gallery in Dignano (Vodnjan) Croatia 2001
- TU Delft Faculty of Architecture, The Netherlands 1987
- Society of Polish Architects, Gdańsk, Poland 1986
- Rotterdam Town Hall, The Netherlands 1986,
- Haarlem Town Hall, The Netherlands 1985,
- Haarlem Cultural Center, The Netherlands 1984,
