= Stefan Flukowski =

Polish writer, poet, and translator

Stefan Flukowski (1902–1972) was a Polish writer, poet and translator. Recognized as a major Polish representative of surrealism.

His most notable piece of work was Wiersze.
