= Gdańsk Przymorze-Uniwersytet railway station =

Railway station in Gdańsk, Poland

Gdańsk Przymorze-Uniwersytet
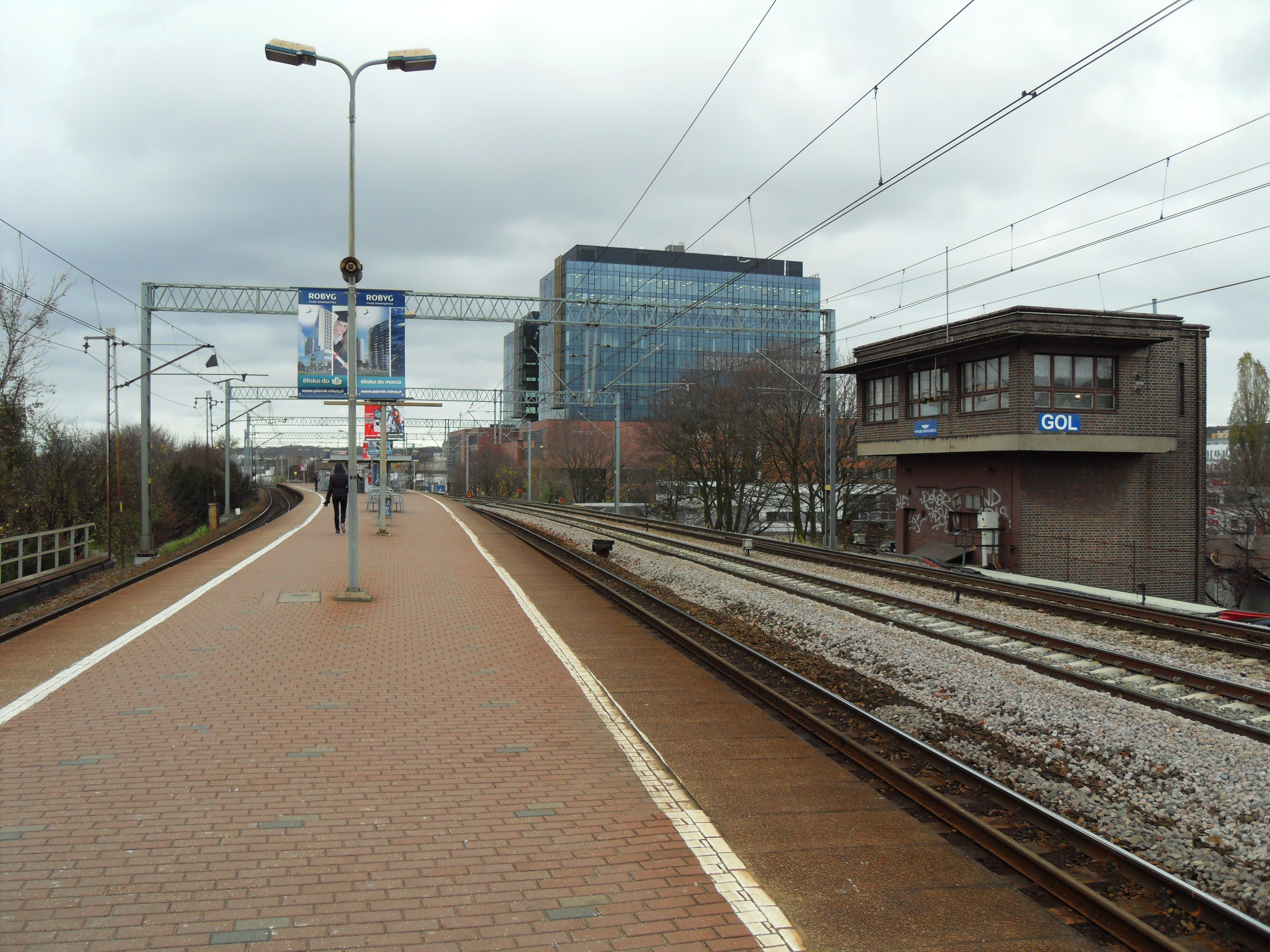

General information
- Location: Gdańsk, Pomeranian Voivodeship; Poland
- System: Railway Station
- Operator: SKM Tricity
- Line: 250: Gdańsk Śródmieście–Rumia railway
- Platforms: 2
- Tracks: 4

History
- Opened: 1952; 74 years ago
- Former names: Gdańsk Przymorze (1965-2004); Gdańsk Polanki (until 1965)
Location
- Location within Poland

Gdańsk Przymorze-Uniwersytet railway station is a railway station serving the city of Gdańsk, in the Pomeranian Voivodeship, Poland. The station opened in 1952 and is located on the Gdańsk Śródmieście–Rumia railway. The train services are operated by SKM Tricity.

Its name is derived from University of Gdańsk (Polish: Uniwersytet Gdański) which is nearby and the neighbourhood of Przymorze. Former names of this stop are Gdańsk Przymorze and Gdańsk Polanki

== General information ==
The platform can be reached by two underways, but only from the eastern side (Kołobrzeska street). There is also a tunnel leading under the tracks and platform connecting both sides. The ticket office is located in separate building near southern underway. There is a press outlet located on the platform.

The stop is commonly used by the University of Gdańsk students coming from more distant regions, which are not able to reach it via tram or bus.

== Train services ==
The station is served by the following services:

- Szybka Kolej Miejska services (SKM) (Lębork -) Wejherowo - Reda - Rumia - Gdynia - Sopot - Gdansk

Preceding station	SKM Tricity	Following station
Gdańsk Oliwa towards Wejherowo or Lębork	SKM Tricity	Gdańsk Zaspa towards Gdańsk Śródmieście

== Nearby transport services ==
Gdańsk Przymorze-Uniwersytet is connected with bus lines No. 122, 139, 149, 199 and 315.
