= Cemetery of Lost Cemeteries =

Monument in Gdańsk, Poland

Coordinates: 54°21′27″N 18°38′34″E

- Cmentarz Nieistniejących Cmentarzy
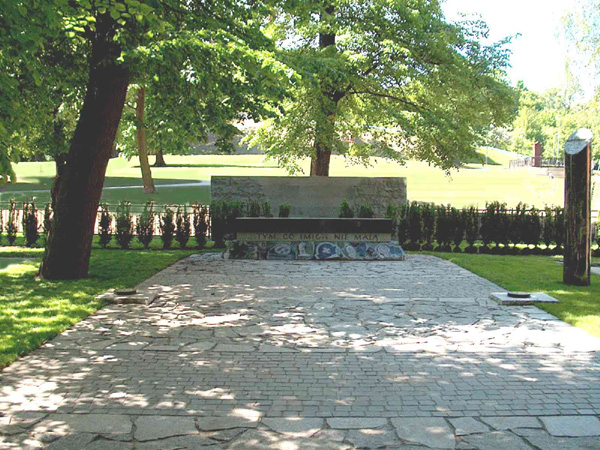

Details
- Established: 24 May 2002
- Location: Śródmieście, Gdańsk, Poland
- No. of graves: 27

The Cemetery of Lost Cemeteries (Polish: Cmentarz Nieistniejących Cmentarzy) is a monument constructed in the form of a cemetery, commemorating the destroyed cemeteries of the city of Gdańsk in Poland.

== History ==
The cemetery was created because of the initiative of Kalina Zabuska, the curator of the National Museum in Gdańsk. In May 1998, it was greenlit by the Gdańsk City Council, and 2 years later, an architectural design competition was held to determine its design. The winners were Hanna Klementowska and Jacek Krenz. The foundation was laid on 31 October 2000 and the cemetery was opened on 24 May 2002. A fragment of a poem by Mascha Kaléko was carved into the central monument.

Cemeteries symbolically "buried" there include several bulldozed ones along the arterial al. Zwycięstwa and ul. Traugutta, as well as Jewish cemeteries in Wrzeszcz and Chełm. There were also cemeteries in Brętowo and in Aniołki, near the Brama Oliwska. In 2003, a controversy broke out regarding Jewish tombstones being moved to the Cemetery of Lost Cemeteries without the permission of the rabbis that had authority over them.

== Composition and layout ==
The cemetery is nondenominational and includes gravestones from a variety of religions. It is meant to imitate the style of a temple; the trees and gravestones around it are organized to create patterns reminiscent of naves. According to the city government of Gdańsk, "the monument is an attempt at atonement and a rejection of the apathy with which abandoned cemeteries in Gdańsk were treated."
