= Otto Günther =

German politician (1822–1897)

Otto Günther (4 November 1822 in Leipzig, Germany – 1897) was a German lawyer and city councilor.

== Biography ==
After graduating from law school he worked as a lawyer. From 1867 to 1872 he was a town councilor in Leipzig. From 1881 to 1897 he was music director at the Leipzig Conservatory.
