= Danzig rebellion =

16th-century armed revolt in Danzig (Gdańsk)

Danzig Rebellion
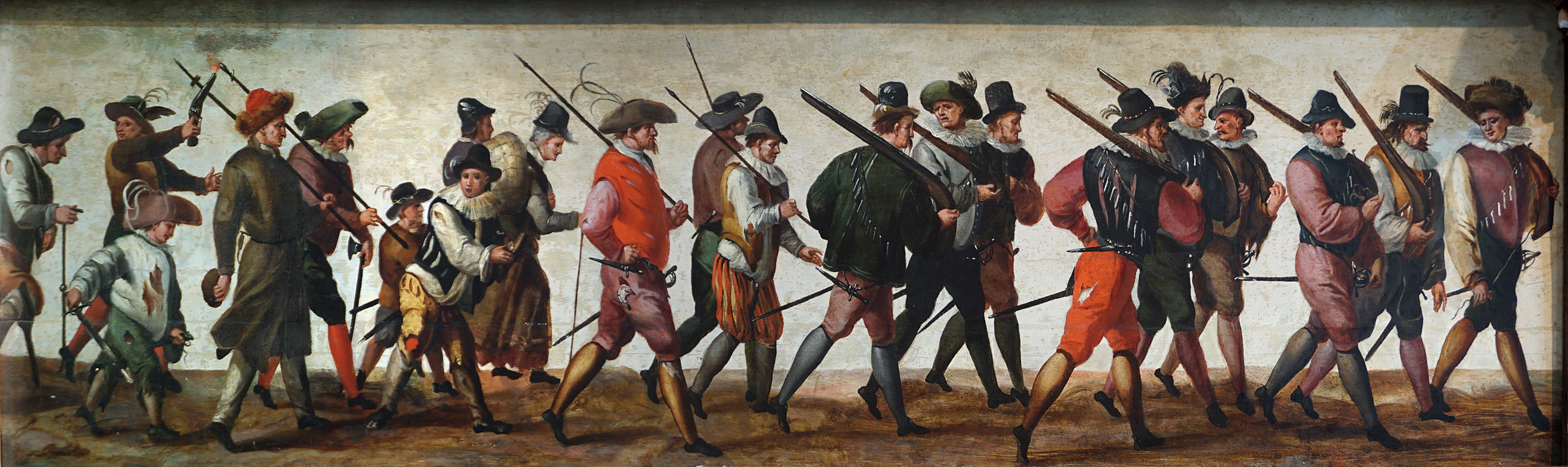
- Danzig infantry, a late 16th-century depiction at Artus Court.
Date	December 1575 – December 1577
Location	Danzig and its surroundings
Result	Treaty of Marienburg

Belligerents
Polish–Lithuanian Commonwealth; Principality of Transylvania	(Free City of Danzig) Danzig; Denmark–Norway

Commanders and leaders
(Polish–Lithuanian Commonwealth) Stephen Báthory (Polish–Lithuanian Commonwealth) Jan Zborowski	(Free City of Danzig) Johann Winkelbruch †

Strength
Around 2,000	Around 12,000

The rebellion of the city of Danzig (now Gdańsk) was a revolt from December 1575 to December 1577 of the city against the outcome of the 1576 Polish–Lithuanian royal election. The Polish throne was contested by Stephen Báthory and the Holy Roman Emperor Maximillian II.

It began on 12 December 1575, when Emperor Maximillian was chosen as monarch by the Polish Senate, while the majority of the szlachta (nobility) had voted for Bathory. It ended on 16 December 1577. Maximilian's II death in October 1576 weakened Danzig's position and made the conflict less about the recognition of the ruler than about Danzig's privileges. With neither side being able to defeat the other militarily, a compromise was reached, with economic as well as religious privileges of the city being restored and recognized, in return for a large reparation and recognition of Bathory as Grand Duke of western Prussia. Danzig made its oath conditional on the removal of the Statute of the Karnkowski commission of 1569/70.

== Background ==
On 20 July 1570, the Polish-Lithuanian king Sigismund II Augustus introduced Karnkowski Statutes, which partly reduced Danzig's special privileges granted by earlier Polish kings after the Prussian Confederation cities recognized their rule in 1454.

In 1572, the throne of the Polish–Lithuanian Commonwealth was vacated when King Sigismund Augustus died without an heir and Henry III of France after a brief period as a Polish king returned to France. The Polish–Lithuanian Commonwealth was an elective monarchy and (after the Union of Lublin in 1569) in close union with Lithuania, meaning that Polish nobility (szlachta) could vote on who would become the next king. Cities had no vote; Danzig however was invited by primate of Poland and interrex Jakub Uchański to cast a vote but declined to send a representative. Members of the Senate (including most of the Polish episcopate led by Jakub Uchański) decided to elect Emperor Maximilian II, against the will of majority of nobility, which during the royal election voted for Anna Jagiello (the last representative of the former Polish-Lithuanian Jagiellon dynasty) and Stephen Báthory as her husband and de facto King. This led to some unrest in Poland.

The town whose economic privileges were reduced by the Karnkowski Statutes, wanted to use the situation to regain its preferential position within the Polish Crown. It also preferred Maximilian, who looked more likely to support the towns' economic privileges, and who could also threaten serious economic repercussions (boycott by the Habsburgs). Thus the city, encouraged by its immense wealth and almost impregnable fortifications, as well as by the secret support of Denmark-Norway and Emperor Maximilian himself, had supported the latter's election.

On 1 May 1576, Stefan Bathory married Anna Jagiello and was crowned by Stanisław Karnkowski as King of Poland. Jakub Uchański and nuncio Wincenty Laureo recognized Maximillian as a King, but soon they and others accepted the will of majority. When Stefan swore in all of existing rights of Royal Prussia and Duchy of Prussia, and was recognized as a rightful ruler, Danzig refused to follow along and still recognized Maximillian as King of Poland.

The tensions grew as rioters looted and burned down an abbey in Oliwa. The abbey belonged to the bishop of Kujawy, Stanisław Karnkowski, who had under his jurisdiction the whole of Polish Pomerania. The Sejm (parliament) of the Commonwealth did not approve higher taxes for the war. It did however approve a banicja (form of political exile and excommunication), confiscation of the city's property, arrest of its citizens, commercial blockade and rerouting of the important trade via the port of Elbing (Elbląg), which however was immediately blockaded by Denmark-Norway's navy.

== Fighting ==
In August 1576, Bathory led 2,000 (Polish soldiers and mercenaries from Transylvania) men to Malbork (Marienburg), from there Polish units took control of the area surrounding Danzig, capturing Grabina and Głowa, two strategically important villages, thereby blockading Danzig's port from the east and the south. The King left the army under the command of Hetman Jan Zborowski and most of the forces were stationed at Dirschau (Tczew). In the west the main base was at Putzig (Puck), where there was a mercenary force led by Ernest Weyher. While some Polish privateer ships fought the Danzig and Danish-Norwegian fleets, for the most part the control of the Baltic Sea belonged to the Danzigers and their allies. Soon after the fighting begun, Maximilian's II death (12 October 1576) was announced; this weakened Danzig's position and made the conflict less about the recognition of the ruler than about Danzig's privileges.

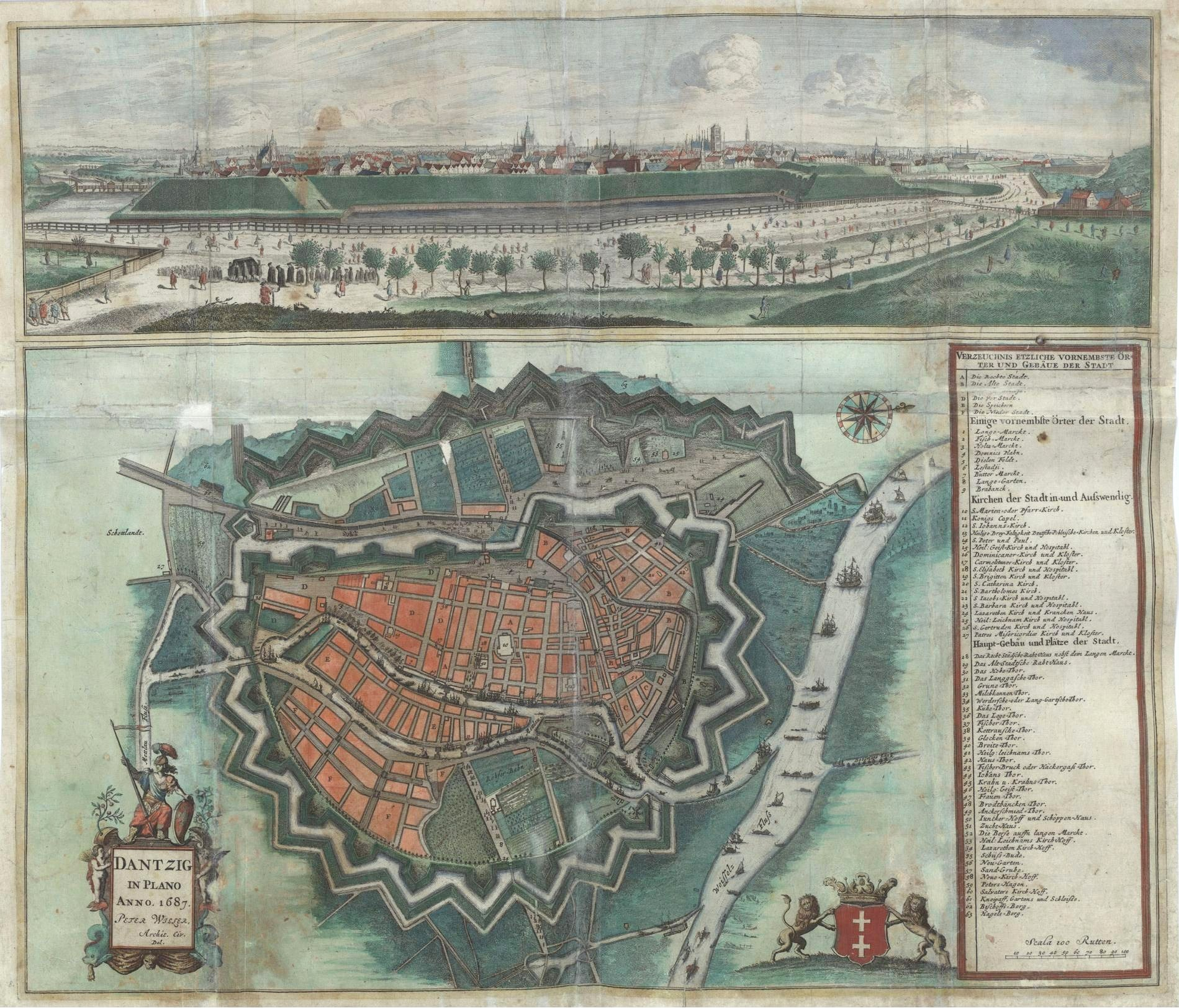
Map showing the fortifications of Danzig as they were over 100 years later

With the coming of the spring of 1577, the fighting began anew. The Danzig army, led by the German mercenary commander Johann Winkelbruch (Hans Winckelburg von Kölln), was about 7,000-12,000 strong (including mercenaries, among them a Scottish regiment), but with less than 1,000 cavalry. Winckelburg decided to crush the small army of Zborowski (who had about 2,000 men, half of them cavalry), but the Danzig army was utterly defeated by Zborowski in the battle of Lubiszewo on 17 April 1577.

After the battle, the Danzig forces retreated behind the walls, citizens pulled down trees and houses in front of fortifications and a siege began. Reinforcement with King Batory arrived only in July. During it King Stefan was using heated cannonballs and turned back the flow of the Radunia river. Bathory had about 11,000 men, and Danzig, about 10,000. A surprise attack by the Danzigers managed to destroy two-thirds of the Polish artillery, vastly slowing the progress of the siege. In September 1577 Danzig and Danish-Norwegian fleets started a blockade of Polish trade along Elbing and attacked its suburbs. Their troops that landed were soon pushed back by Bathory's Hungarian infantry under Gáspár Bekes, and the city council sent a note thanking the King.

However, after a few months, Stephen's army was unable to take the city by force. On 16 December 1577, the siege ended and citizens swore loyalty to Stefan's representatives Eustachy Wołłowicz and Andrzej Firlej. (Treaty of Malbork).

== Aftermath ==
The Gdańsk merchants had suffered a great deal from the blockade, especially because of lack of trade. In the meantime, Bathory also wanted to end the siege, as Ivan the Terrible of Muscovy broke a three-year truce in the same year and Muscovy tried to gain control of the eastern territories of the Commonwealth (Livonian War).

The siege and all economic restrictions that were passed in the past two years were lifted in return for reparations and recognition of Bathory as the sovereign. Stefan forgave the city's rebellion and again turned Polish trade from Elbing to Danzig. The city, in turn, recognized him as ruler of Poland and promised to pay the large sum of 200,000 złotys and an additional 20,000 repatriation to the abbey of Oliwa in five years.

On 26 November 1585 the Karnkowski Statutes from 1570 were lifted, and Danzig again became the most privileged city in the Commonwealth.

== See also ==
- History of Gdańsk
