= Siege of Danzig (1577) =

Engagement during the Danzig rebellion

Coordinates: 54°22′00″N 18°38′00″E

- Part of Danzig rebellion
Date	mid-1577 to December
Location	Danzig (Gdańsk), Royal Prussia, Polish–Lithuanian Commonwealth
Result	inconclusive

Belligerents
Polish–Lithuanian Commonwealth; Principality of Transylvania	(Free City of Danzig) Gdańsk

Strength
~10,000	~3,000

The siege of Danzig was a six-month siege in 1577 of the city of Danzig, the Polish–Lithuanian Commonwealth (today Gdańsk) by Stephen Báthory, the head of state of the Commonwealth. The siege ended in a negotiated agreement. It formed part of the Danzig rebellion.

The conflict began when the city of Danzig, along with the Polish episcopate and a portion of the Polish szlachta, did not recognize the royal election of Bathory to the Commonwealth throne and instead supported the candidature of Emperor Maximilian. This led to a short conflict, of which the siege of Danzig was the last part.

After a siege of six months, the Danzig army of 5,000 mercenaries, among them a Scottish regiment, was defeated in a field battle on 16 December 1577. However, since Báthory's armies – the combined Commonwealth, and Hungarian forces – were unable to take the city itself, a compromise was reached: Báthory confirmed the city's special status and its Danzig law privileges granted by the earlier Polish kings in return for 200,000 złotys reparations and recognition of him as sovereign.

== See also ==
- History of Gdańsk (Danzig)
