= Monument to the Fallen Shipyard Workers of 1970 =

Monument in Gdańsk, Poland

Coordinates: 54.3605°N 18.6492°E

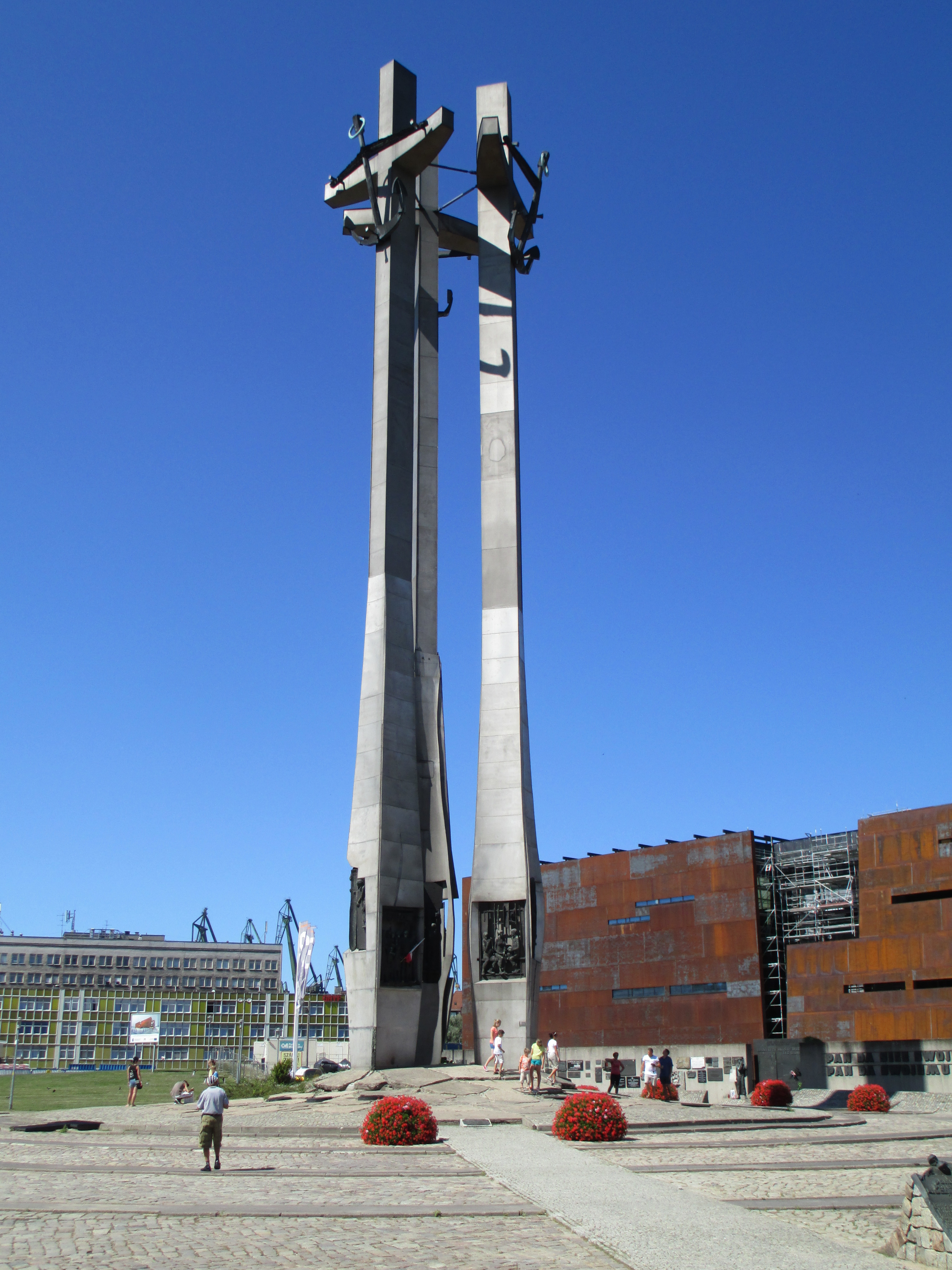
Monument to the Fallen Shipyard Workers of 1970 (with the European Solidarity Centre behind)

The Monument to the Fallen Shipyard Workers 1970 (Polish: Pomnik Poległych Stoczniowców 1970) was unveiled on 16 December 1980 near the entrance to what was then the Lenin Shipyard in Gdańsk, on the Baltic coast of northern Poland. It commemorates the 42 or more people killed during the Coastal cities events in December 1970. It was created in the aftermath of the Gdańsk Agreement and is the first monument to the victims of communist oppression to be erected in a communist country. It was designed by: Bogdan Pietruszka, Wiesław Szyślak, Wojciech Mokwiński and Jacek Krenz.

== Gallery ==
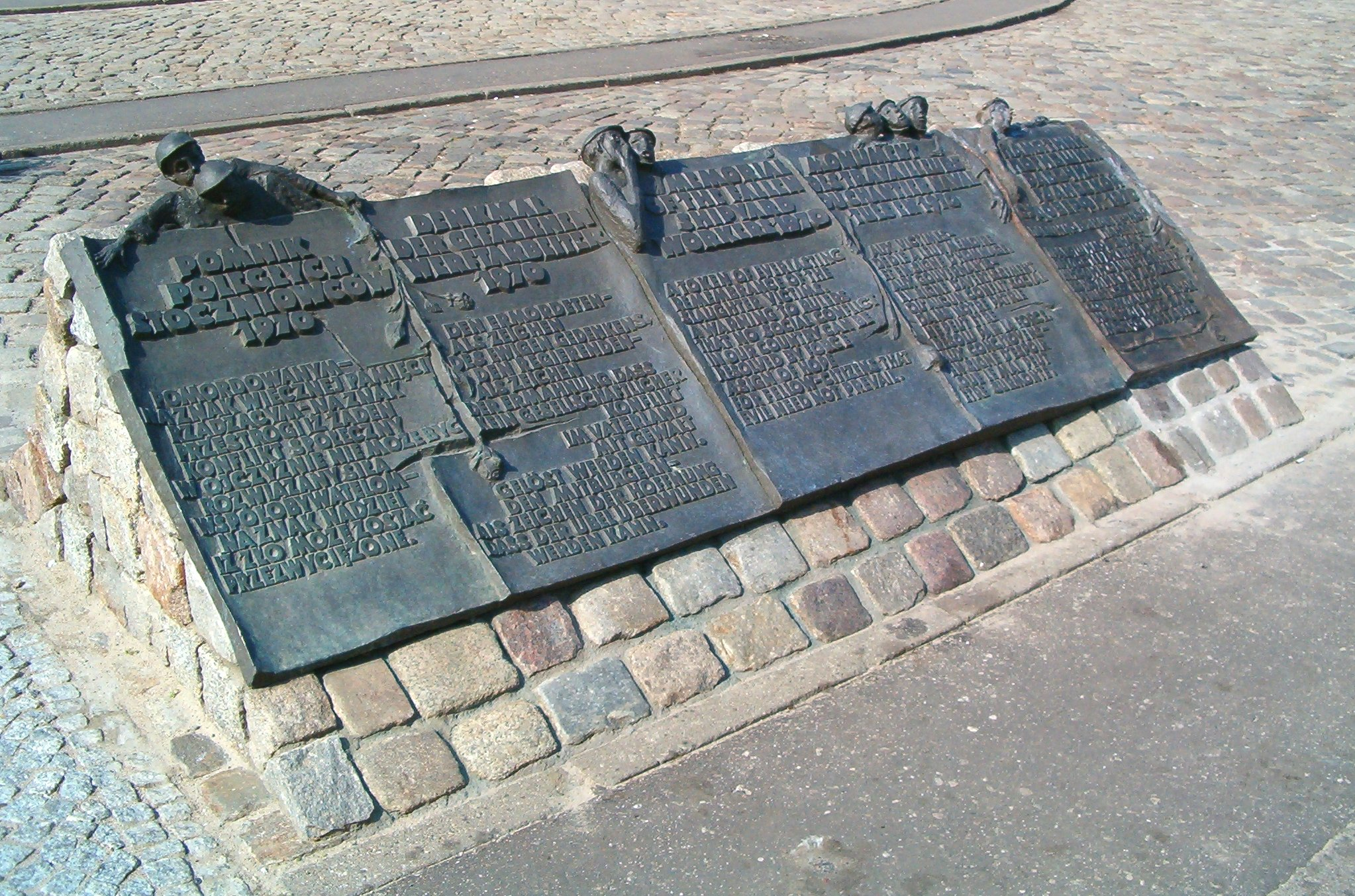

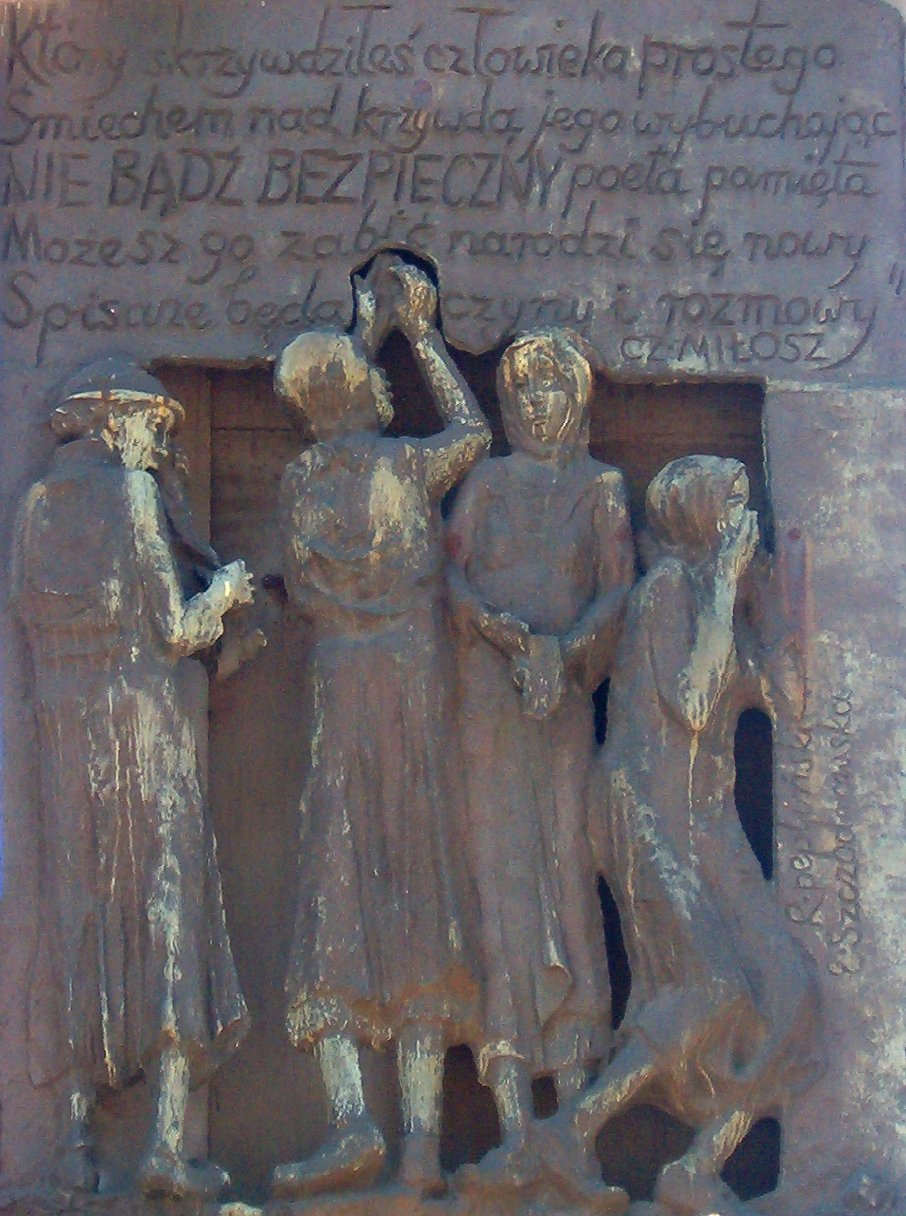

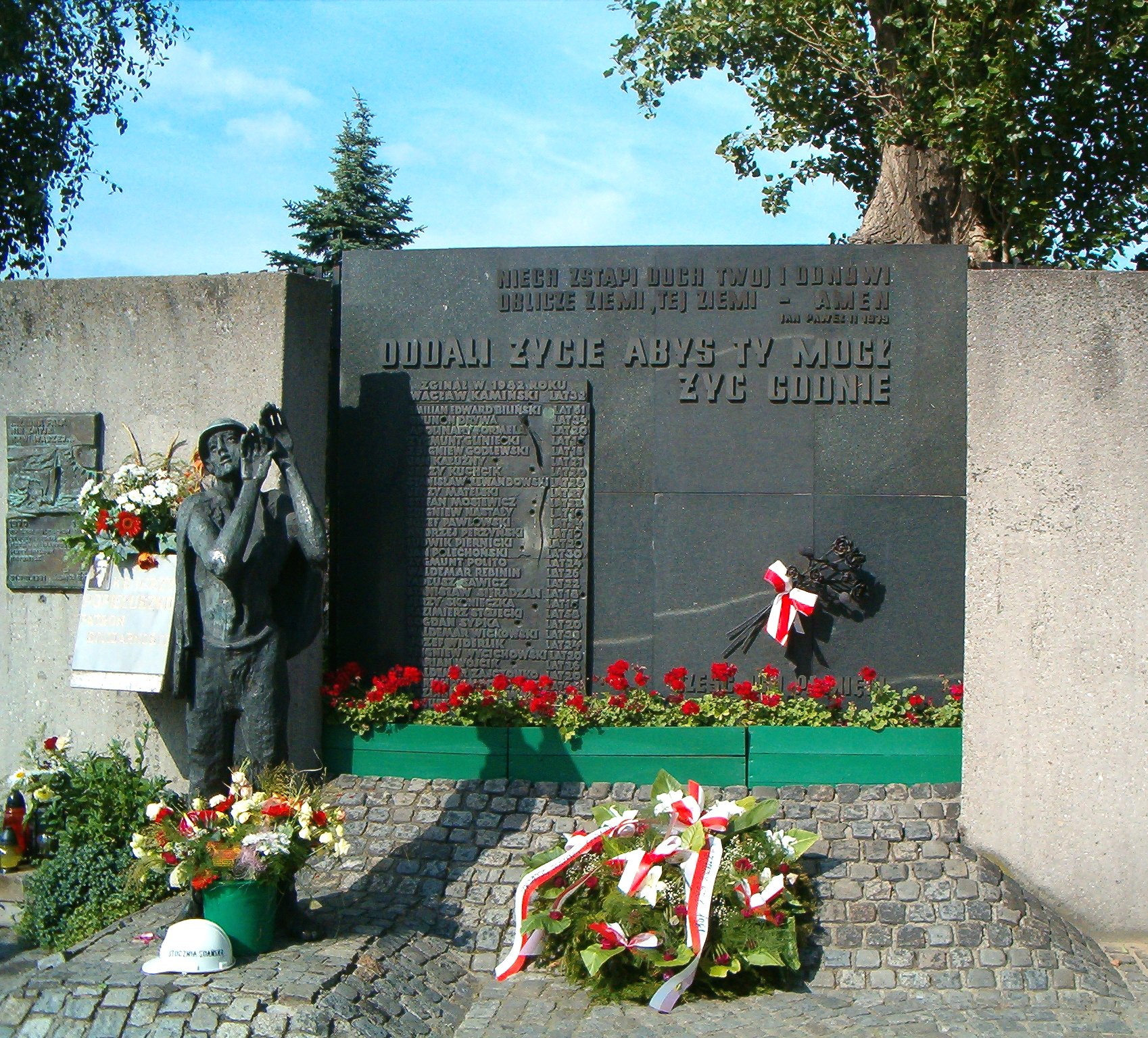

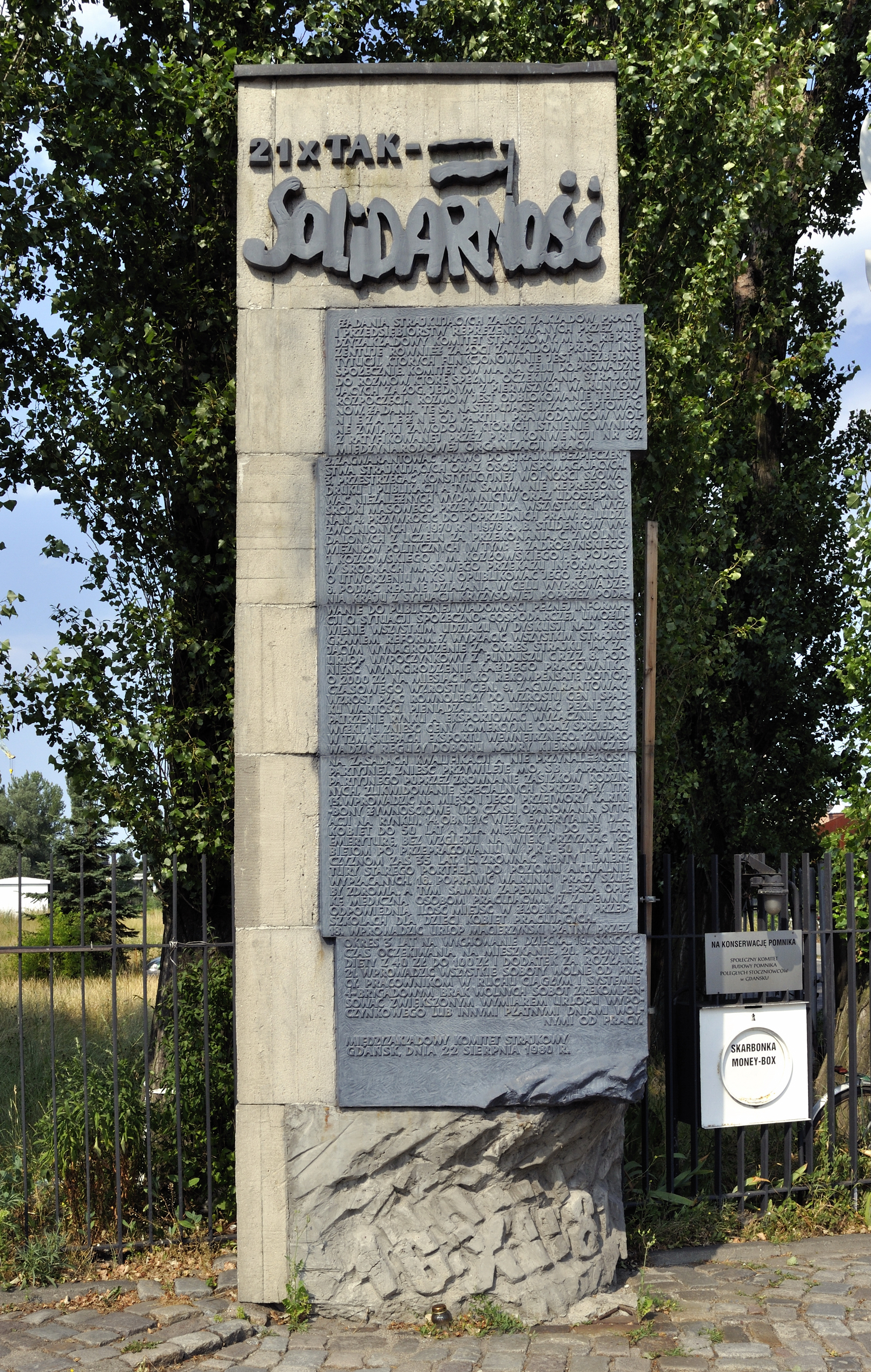

== See also ==
- Solidarity
- Gdańsk Shipyard
