= Statue of Johannes Hevelius (Wodopój Street, Gdańsk) =

Monument in Gdańsk, Poland

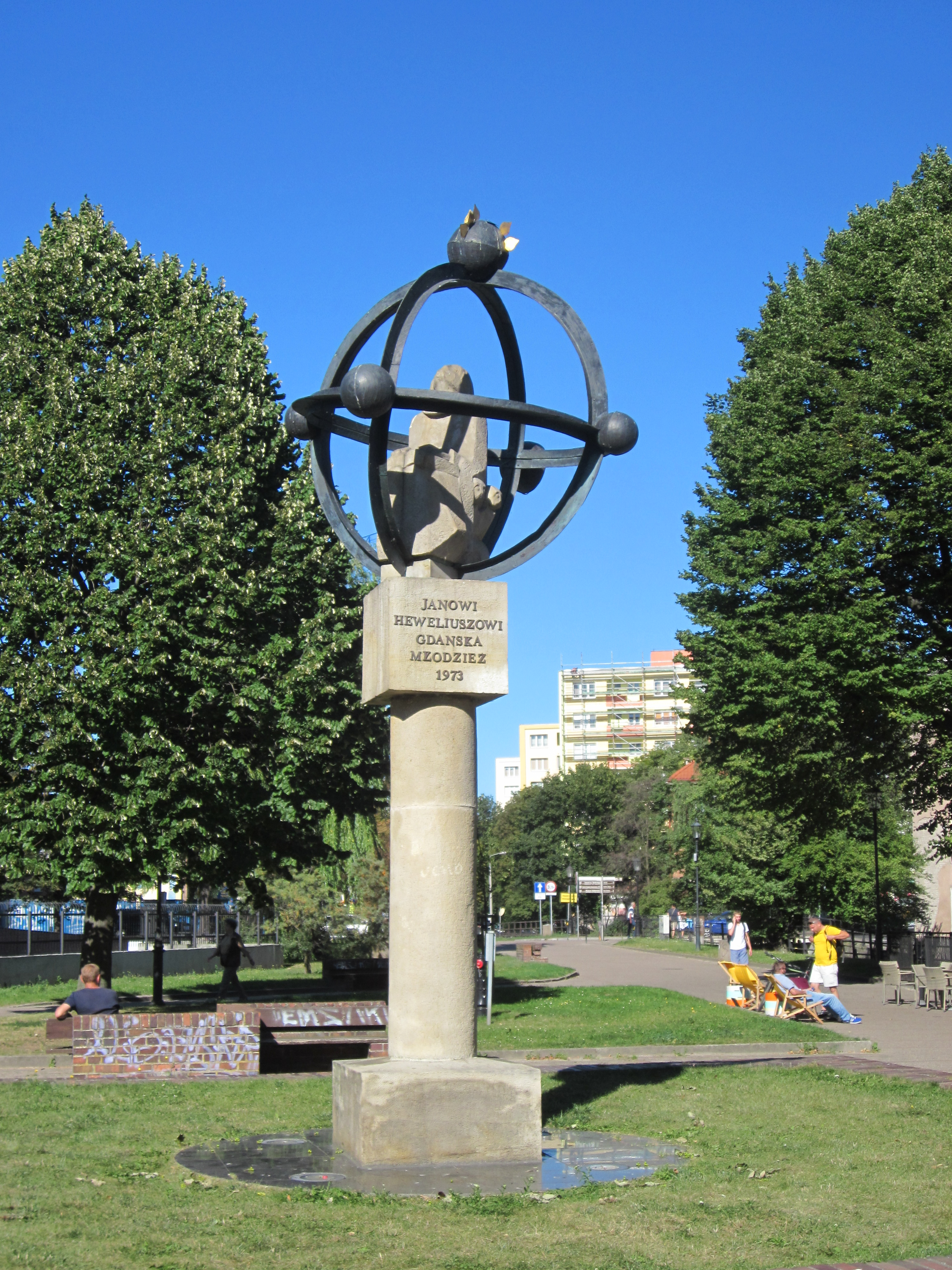
- The monument in 2015.
- Interactive map of Statue of Johannes Hevelius
- Location: Wodopój Street, Downtown, Gdańsk, Poland
- Coordinates: 54°21′06.7″N 18°38′59″E
- Designer: Michał Gąsienica Szostak
- Type: Statue
- Material: Sandstone (statue); Copper (sculpture); Granite (pedestal); Bronze (inscription)
- Height: 5 m (16 ft)
- Opening date: 18 February 1973
- Dedicated to: Johannes Hevelius

The statue of Johannes Hevelius (Polish: Pomnik Jana Heweliusza) is a monument in Gdańsk, Poland, placed at Wodopój Street, within the Old Town neighbourhood of the Downtown district. It is dedicated to Johannes Hevelius, a 17th-century astronomer considered as the founder of selenography, and politician who was the councillor and mayor of Gdańsk. The monument was designed by Michał Gąsienica Szostak, and unveiled on 18 February 1973. Originally placed at Korzenna Street, it was moved in 2004 to Wodopój Street. The monument consists of a sandstone statue of Hevelius, inside a copper spherical astrolabe, and placed on a granite column.

== History ==
The monument dedicated to Johannes Hevelius was financed from donations of local inhabitants, collected since 1970, from the initiative of the Neptune Association of the Friends of the Children. It was sculpted by Michał Gąsienica Szostak, and unveiled on 18 February 1973, as part of celebrations of the 500th anniversary of the birth of Nicolaus Copernicus, a polymath who formulated the heliocentric model of the universe. The monument was originally placed on a small square between the Great Mill and the Old Town Hall, near Korzenna Street. The place was chosen, as the location of Hevelius's observatory in the 1640s. On 8 December 2004, it was moved to a garden square at Wodopój Street, near the Hotel Mercure Gdańsk Stare Miasto, formerly known as the Hotel Hevelius, which stands at 22 Haweliusza Street.

== Overview ==
A sandstone sculpture, depicting Johannes Hevelius, sitting in a chair, with a book on his lap, looking upwards towards the sky, forms its main element. It is surrounded by a spherical astrolabe, made from copper, and formed from three circles, joined by its sides, with smaller spheres placed at their connecting points. It is placed on a granite column, formed from two cubes joined by a cylinder in the middle. It features a Polish inscription made from bronze letters, which reads:

Polish inscription

Janowi Jaweliuszowi
Gdańska młodzież
1973

Translation:
English translation

To Johannes Hevelius
The youth of Gdańsk
1973

The monument is 5 m tall. The statue has the height of 1 m, and circles surrounding it have a diameter of 2 m.
