= Statue of Johannes Hevelius (Hevelius Square, Gdańsk) =

Monument in Gdańsk, Poland

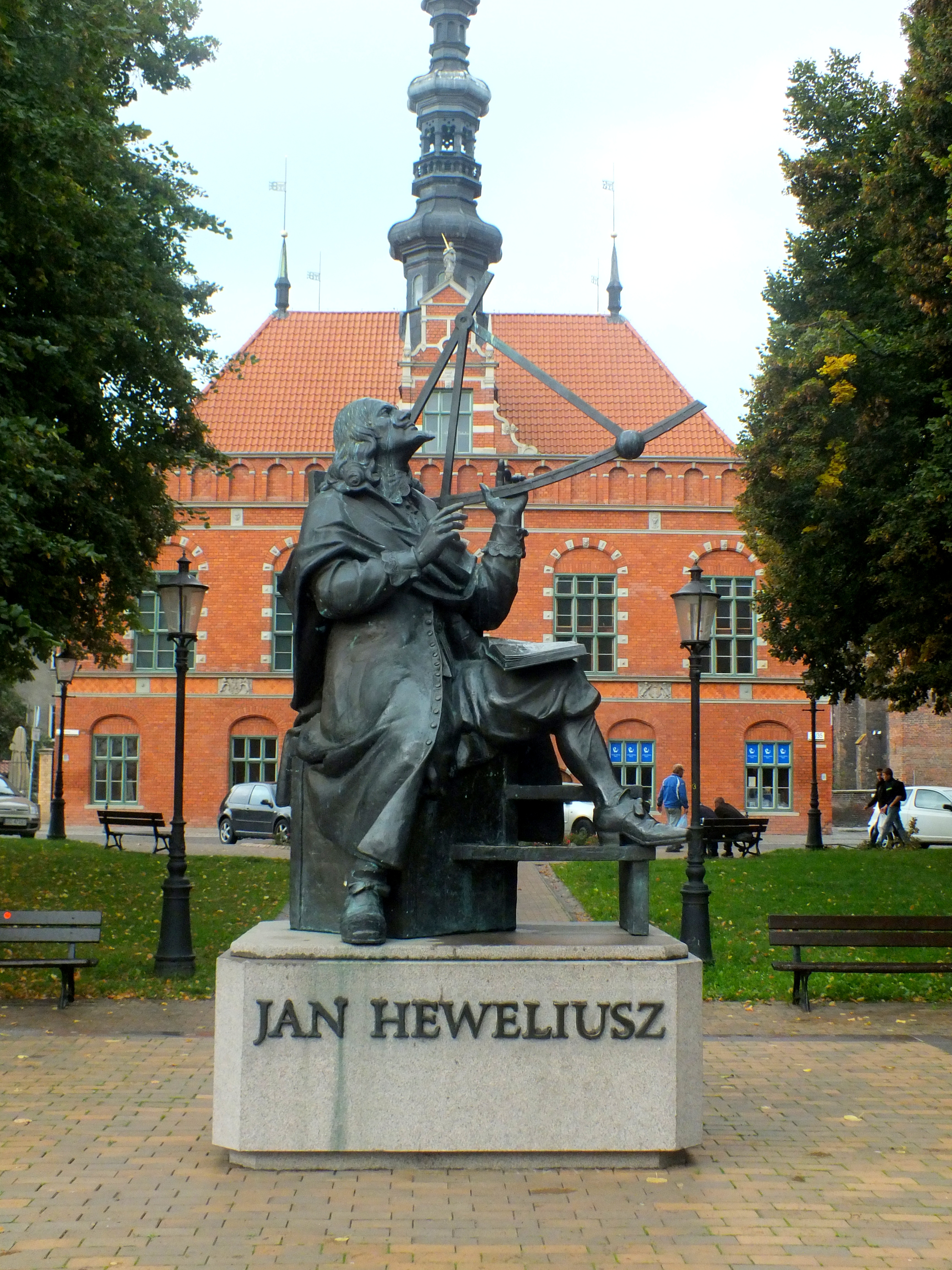
- The monument in 2014.
- Interactive map of Statue of Johannes Hevelius
- Location: Hevelius Square, Downtown, Gdańsk, Poland
- Coordinates: 54.354120°N 18.648805°E
- Designer: Jan Szczypka
- Type: Statue
- Material: Bronze (statue); granite (pedestal)
- Height: 3.1 m (total); 2.3 m (statue)
- Dedicated to: Johannes Hevelius

The statue of Johannes Hevelius (Polish: Pomnik Jana Heweliusza) is a Baroque Revival sculpture in Gdańsk, Poland, placed at the Hevelius Square near Korzenna Street, within the Old Town neighbourhood of the Downtown district. The bronze statue is dedicated to Johannes Hevelius, a 17th-century astronomer considered the founder of selenography, and a politician who was the councillor and mayor of Gdańsk. It was designed by Jan Szczypka and unveiled on 28 January 2006.

== History ==
The statue was designed by Jan Szczypka and unveiled on 28 January 2006, during the celebrations of the 395th anniversary of the birth of Johannes Hevelius, in front of the Old Town Hall, near Korzenna Street. It was placed in the location formerly occupied by another statue of Hevelius, originally unveiled there in 1973, and moved to Wodopój Street in 2004. It was also the location of Hevelius's observatory in the 1640s. In 2009, Jan Szczypka designed a sgraffito mural depicting a star chart, which was painted on the neighbouring townhouse, making it appear as if Hevelius was looking at the night sky.

== Overview ==
The monument was designed in the Baroque Revival style. The bronze statue depicts Johannes Hevelius sitting in the chair with a book on his lap, and looking towards the sky, while using a large sextant. It is placed on a light grey granite pedestal, with the dimensions of 80 cm x 180 cm x 131 cm. It features an inscription which reads "Jan Heweliusz, meaning Johannes Hevelius in Polish. The statue is 2.3 m tall, while the total height of the monument is 3.1 m. The figure faces a wall of a tenement building, featuring a mural by Jan Szczypka, which depicts a star chart. The monument is placed at the Hevelius Square, near Korzenna Street, in front of the Old Town Hall. The surrounding pavement features three plaques with inscriptions in English, Polish, and German. They read:

English inscription
Johannes Hevelius 1611–1687
Outstanding scientist
and astronomer
Author of atlas of the sky
Discoverer of numerous
comets and constellations
Brilliant designer
and inventor
Renowned Gdansk brewer

Polish inscription
Jan Heweliusz 1611–1687
Wybitny naukowiec
i astronom
Twórca atlasu nieba
Odkrywca wielu komet
i gwiazdozbiorów
Genialny konstruktor
i wynalazca
Znany gdański browarnik

German inscription
Johannes Hevelius 1611–1687
Hervorragender Gelehrte
und Astronom
Schopfer des Himmelsatlasse
Entdecker vieler Kometen
und Sternbilder
Genialer Konstrukteur
und Erfinder
Bekannter Danziger Brauer

== Gallery ==
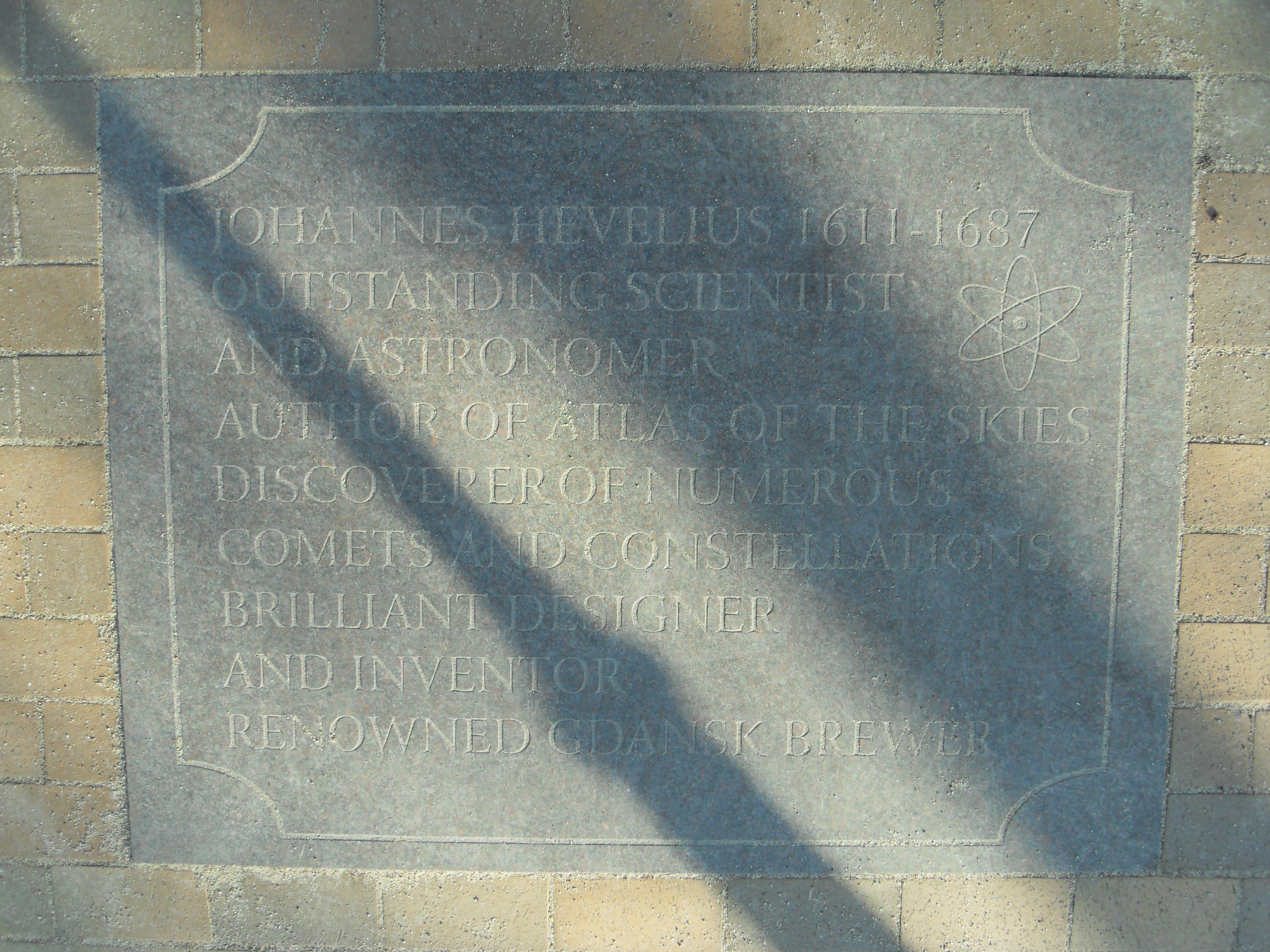
Plaque with English inscription.

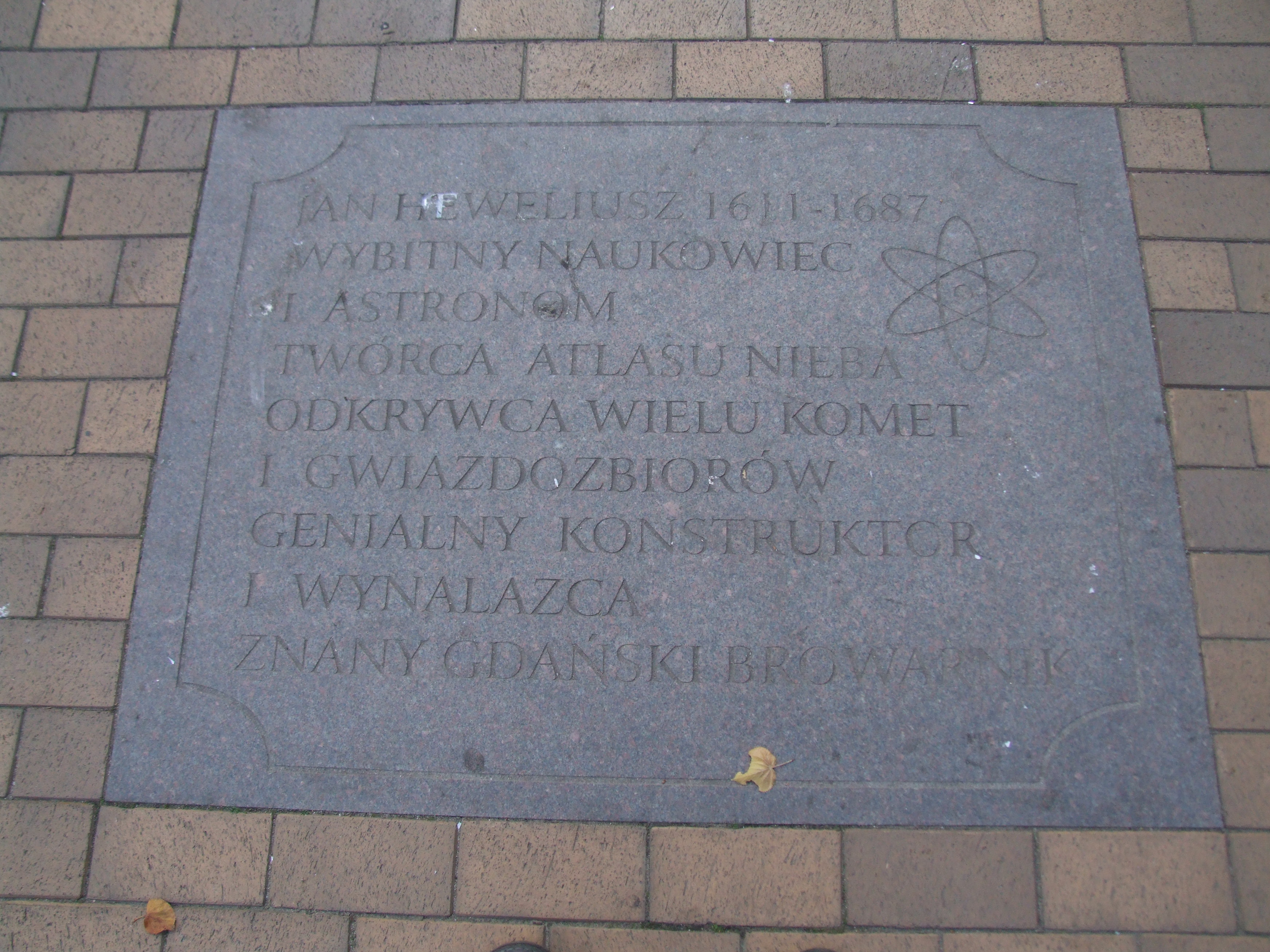
Plaque with Polish inscription.

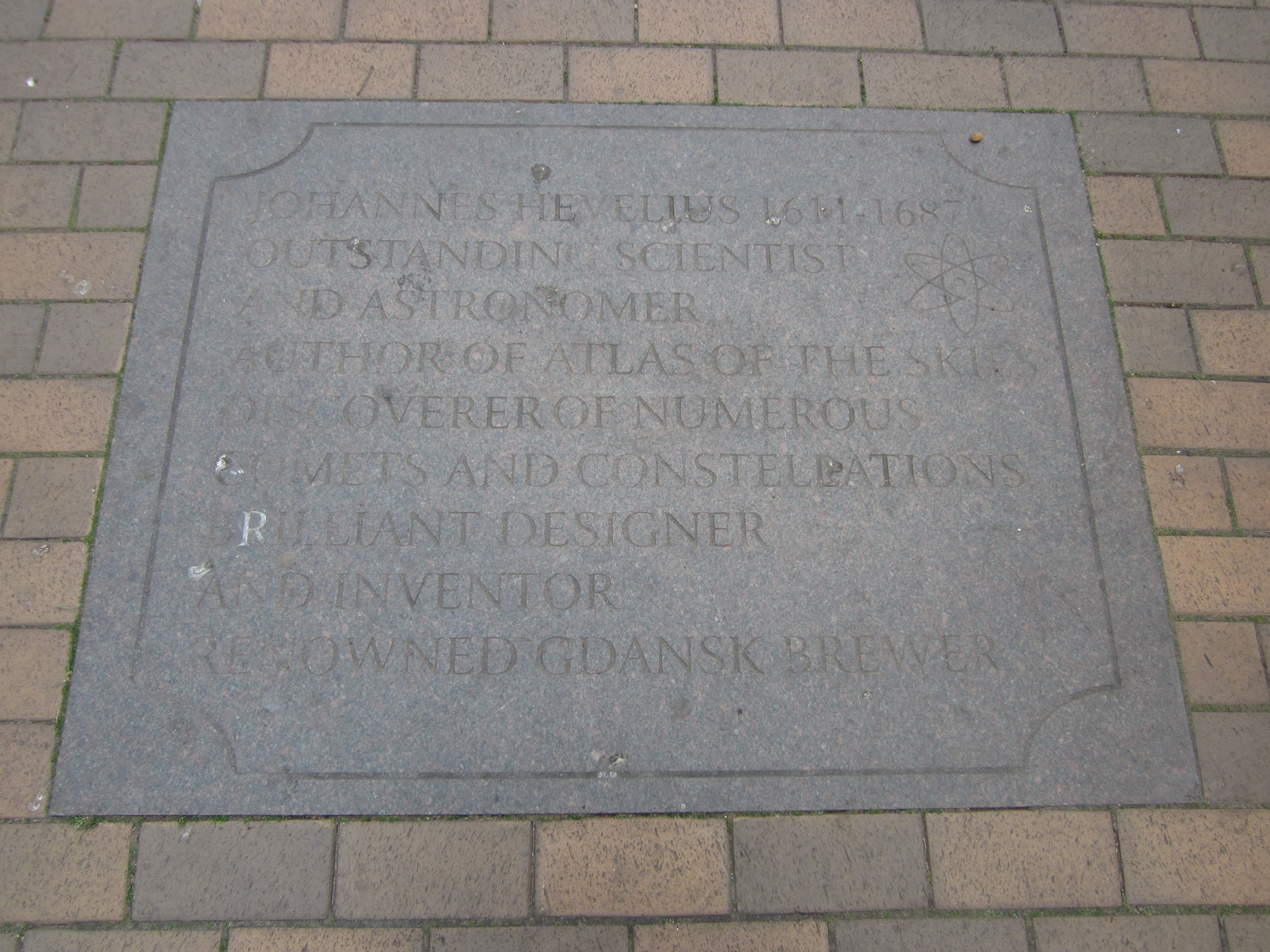
Plaque with German inscription.

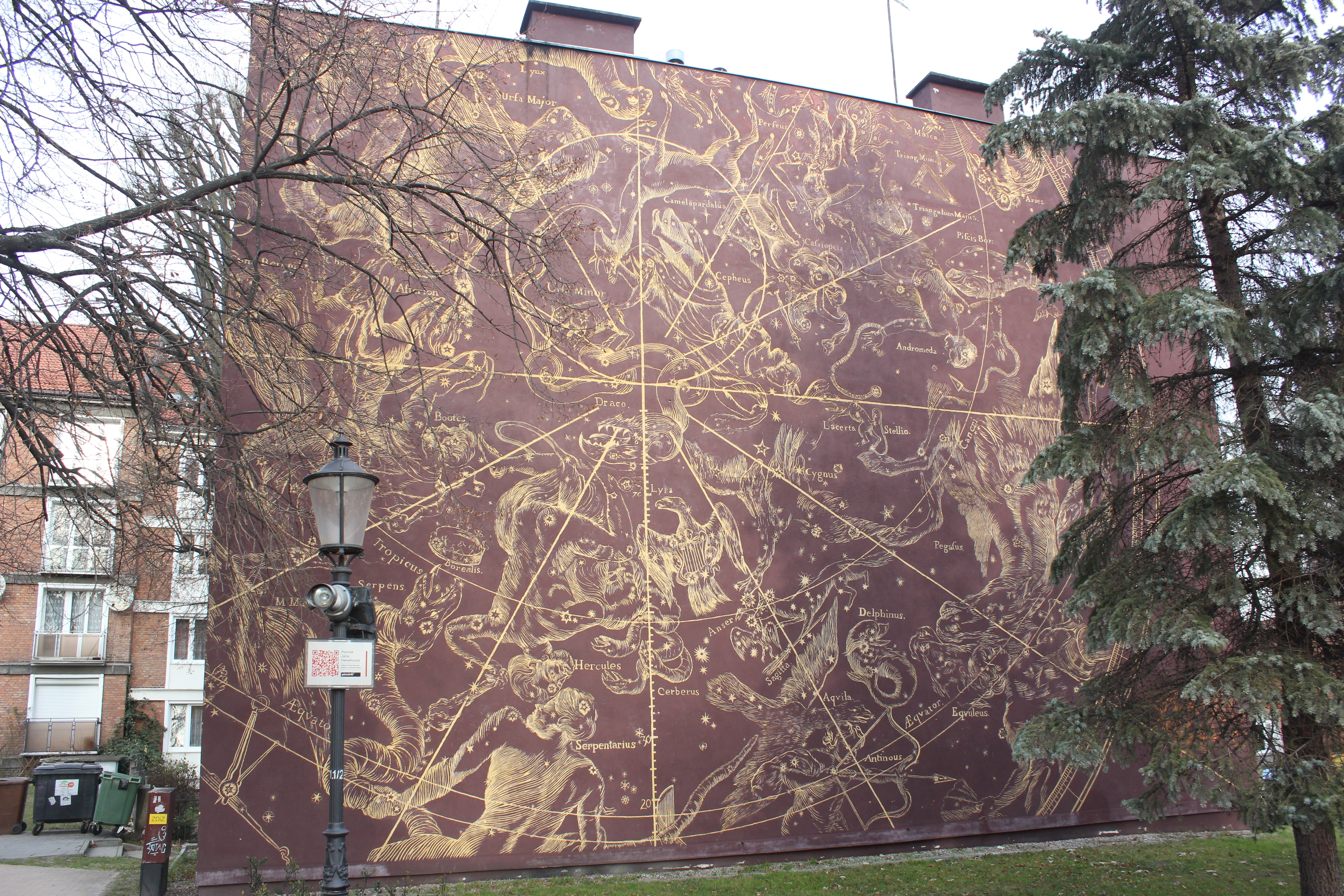
The sky chart mural near the monument.
