= Water Artistry =

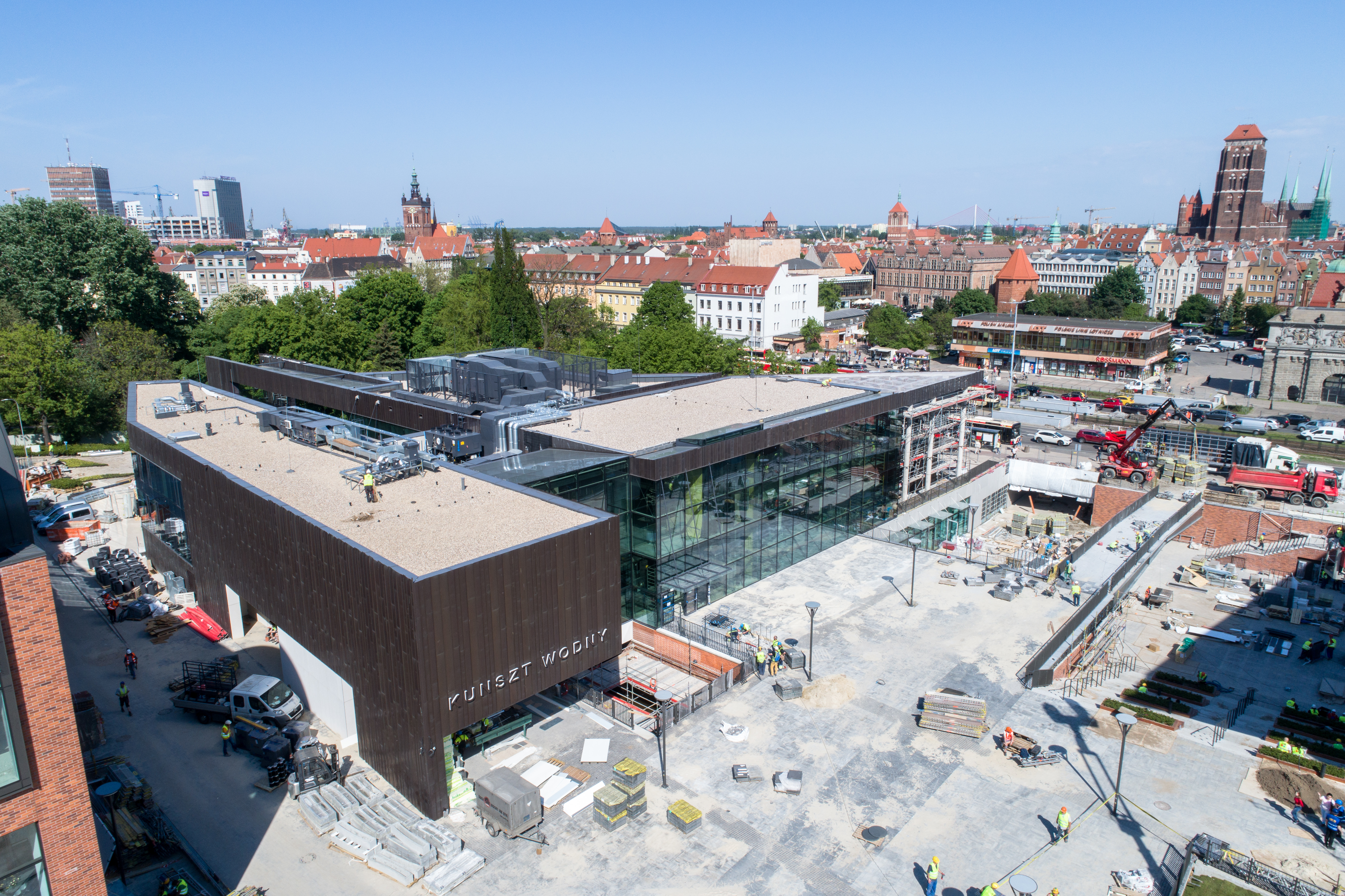
- The Kunszt Wodny in 2018
- Interactive map of the Water Artistry area

General information
- Architectural style: Baroque (first building); Modern (second building)
- Location: Targ Rakowy 11; Gdańsk, Poland
- Coordinates: 54.3505°N 18.6448°E
- Years built: 1536–1539 (first building); 2018–2023 (second building)
- Opened: 1539 (first building); 22 September 2023 (second building)
- Closed: 1852 (first building)
- Demolished: 1920 (first building)
- Owner: Institute of City Culture

The Water Artistry (Polish: Kunszt Wodny; German: Wasserkunst) is a former pumping station located in Gdańsk, close to Forum Gdańsk. Operational in its original role from 1539 to 1852, it was demolished in 1920 and reopened in 2023 as the central building of a cultural institute.

== History ==
=== Pumping station (1539–1920) ===
Up to the mid-16th century, drinking water was delivered to the city of Danzig (today Gdańsk) by way of the Radunia Canal, but repeated epidemics resulted in doubts among the citizens as to how clean the water in the canal was. In 1536, after numerous rejections, the city's councilmen managed to attain the permission of King Sigismund I the Old to source water from the nearby Jasień Lake. However, to do so, a pumping station was needed. Thus, the Kunszt Wodny was built, being completed in 1539.

The Kunszt Wodny was repeatedly modernized, rebuilt, and renovated, including after a fire in 1562 and after the siege of Danzig in 1577. It was also modernized by Adam Wybe in 1639 and by the pair of Michael Wittwerck and Jean Charpentier from 1717 to 1719. The drawings of Matthaeus Deisch from the mid-18th century show that the building was built in the Baroque style of architecture.

The Kunszt Wodny consisted of a building which had a width of 50 metres (160 ft) and a tower which had a height of 10 metres (33 ft). At the bottom of an 8-metre (26 ft) deep water tank, known as a kufa, two cylindrical pistons just above the waterline of the Radunia Canal pressed water into the tank, from where the water flowed into pipes that crossed above the city's moat to the vicinity of the Brama Wyżynna and further to the water network of the city proper.

Due to the worsening economic situation of the city in the 18th century, its government did not maintain the Kunszt Wodny as well, and when the building suffered a fire in May 1852, it was not rebuilt. By 1869, it had been superseded by a modern sewage network and its remnants were eventually demolished by the city of Danzig around 1920.

=== Current building (2023–) ===
In 2011, the government office Biuro Gdańsk 2016 was established with the goal of making Gdańsk the European Capital of Culture in 2016. However, once that failed, the office was renamed to the Institute of City Culture. It was assigned the role of overseeing the planning and construction of the Kunszt Wodny, an investment primarily spearheaded by the developers of Forum Gdańsk first proposed in 2012. The new Kunszt Wodny had very little in common with the old building, aside from its name and location.

The building was initially scheduled to be completed in 2018, but was first delayed to 2019 and then to late 2021 or early 2022 before finally being opened on 22 September 2023. Features of the building include a bistro, Bistro Miasto; a bookstore; a large interactive scale model of the city of Gdańsk; and a stage for performances.

== Bibliography ==
- Hoffmann, Albrecht (2000). Die Wasserkunst der Hansestadt Danzig. Mainz: von Zabern.
