= House of the Pelplin Abbots =

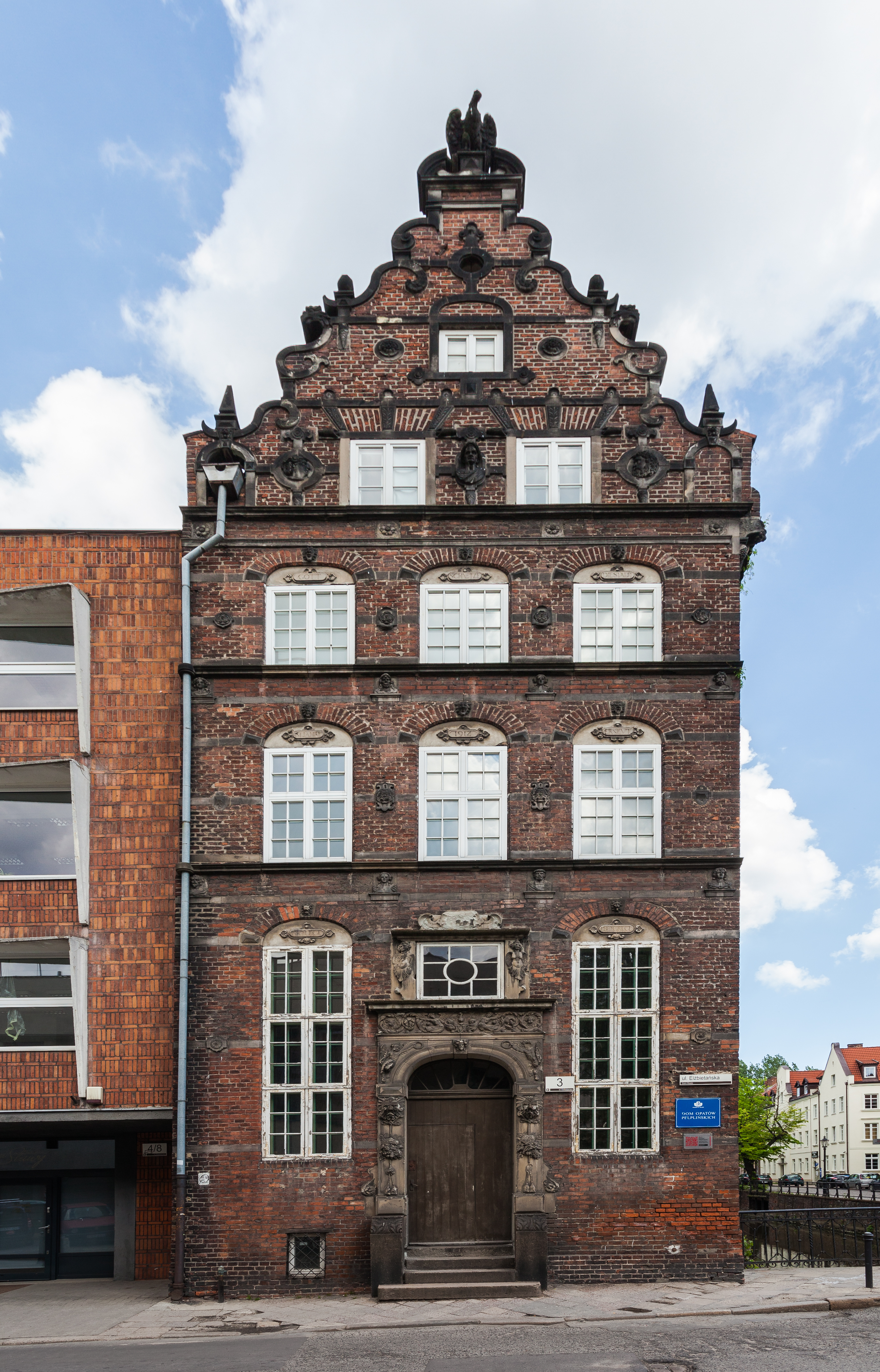
- The House of the Pelplin Abbots, 2013
- Interactive map of the House of the Pelplin Abbots area

General information
- Architectural style: Northern Mannerism
- Location: ul. Bielańska 5 Śródmieście, Gdańsk
- Coordinates: 54.3535°N 18.6469°E
- Completed: 1612
- Owner: University of Gdańsk

Technical details
- Floor count: 4

Design and construction
- Architect: Abraham van den Blocke (possibly)

The House of the Pelplin Abbots (Polish: Dom Opatów Pelplińskich) is a 17th-century townhouse in central Gdańsk, in the Old Town. It is on the regional heritage list.

== Characteristics and location ==
The House of the Pelplin Abbots is located at ul. Bielańska 5, in the Old Town neighbourhood of central Gdańsk, beside the Radunia Canal. It has 4 floors and an available attic. It is built mostly of brick, with the inside being lit by large, rectangular windows. The floors are separated by sets of cornices and frises. The building houses the Museum of the University of Gdańsk, with exhibitions detailing the history, as well as cultural and scientific influence, of the University of Gdańsk (which owns the building). Entrance to the museum is free.

== History ==
The exact date of the building's construction is unknown, though popularly said to be 1612. The architect behind it was also uncertain, although Abraham van den Blocke is also popularly said to have designed it. The first known owner of the property was Peter Hennigk, recorded in 1623, followed by Johann Dönhoff in 1646. On 5 September 1686, the townhouse was bought by Władysław Stanisław Łoś, the voivode of Pomerania, for the prior of Pelplin Abbey, Ludwig Aleksander Łoś, who was his brother.

The townhouse was transformed by Ludwig into an inn, Die Pelplinische Herberge, and it remained in the hands of the Pelplin Abbey until the abbey's dissolution in 1823. The owner of the townhouse from 1837 to 1860, P. J. Schewitzky, converted the interior spaces into an apartment and renovated parts of the building. Further renovations and changes were made by Philipp Schmidt, its owner from 1860 onwards. It belonged to the Gohrband family of carpenters from 1907 to 1910, being bought by the Danzig city government in 1911 and renovated the following year; it was first used by the city council and then by various institutions of the Free City, including the city's Construction Police, as well as the National Construction Office.

Parts of the building were destroyed in 1945, before being rebuilt in 1946. From 1948 to 1950, it housed the Baltic Institute, followed by the Miastoprojekt Construction Design and Research Society starting in c. 1955. Since 1995, the owner of the building has been the University of Gdańsk, housing its Institute of Art History. In 2018, it was announced that a Museum of the University of Gdańsk would be opened in the building by 2020; it was opened in 2024, following a general renovation concluding on 15 November 2023.
