= Preachers' House, Gdańsk =

Preachers' House
- Dom Kaznodziei
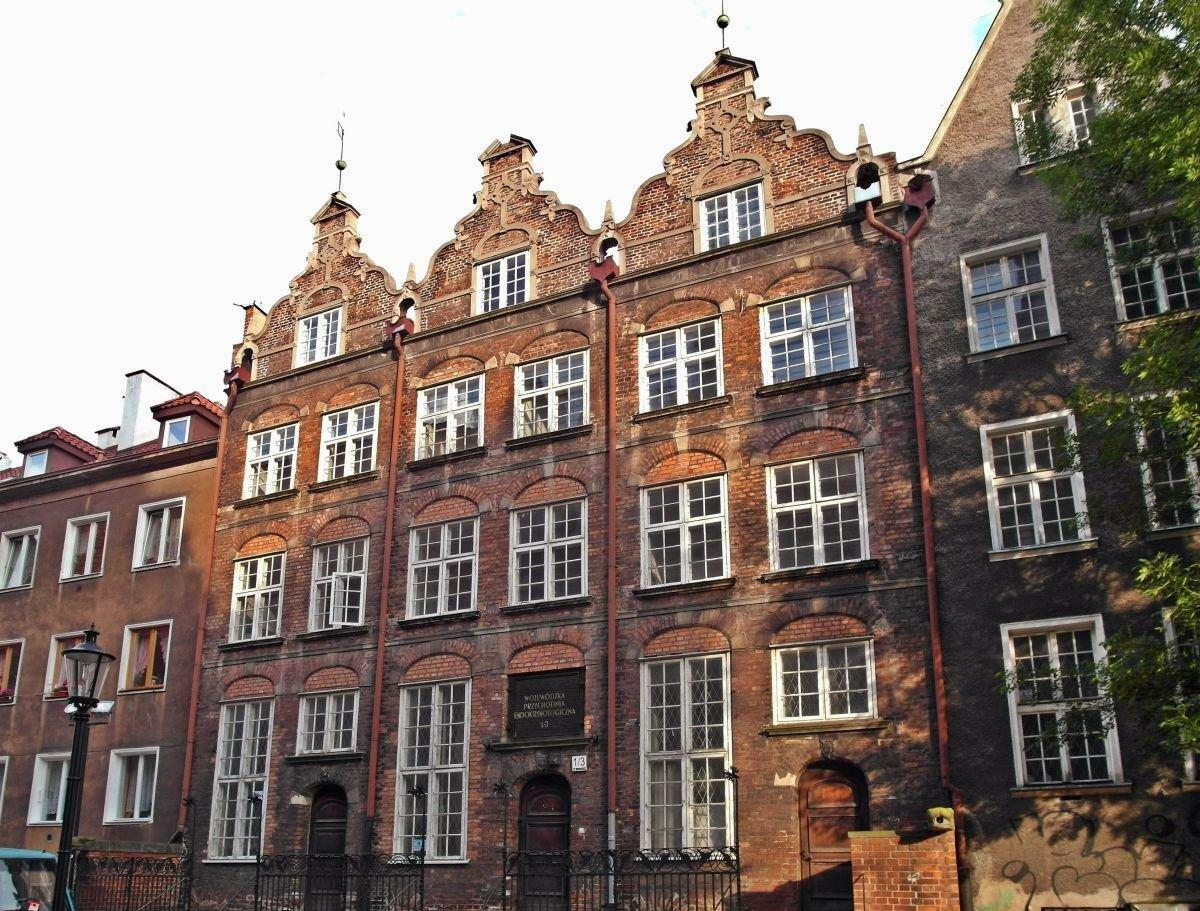
- Main façade

- Location within Poland
- Former names: German: Predigerhaus
- Alternative names: House of Three Preachers

General information
- Status: Completed
- Type: townhouse
- Architectural style: Mannerism
- Location: Old Town, ul. Katarzynki 1-3, Gdańsk, pl
- Coordinates: 54.353702°N 18.651489°E
- Groundbreaking: 1599
- Completed: 1602
- Renovated: 1970

Design and construction
- Architect: Anthonis van Obbergen

Historic Monument of Poland
- Designated: 1994-09-08
- Part of: Gdańsk – city within the 17th-century fortifications
- Reference no.: M.P. 1994 nr 50 poz. 415

Preachers' House (also House of Three Preachers; Polish: Dom Kaznodziei or Dom Trzech Kaznodziei) is a Mannerist townhouse in Gdańsk, Poland. It is located on Katarzynki Street, in the centre of the historical Old Town.

== History ==
The house was constructed between 1599 and 1602 according to plans by a local architect, Anthonis van Obberghen. Initially, it housed rooms for the Lutheran clergy serving in the nearby St. Catherine's Church. The façade, one of the few in the area to survive World War II, is divided into three distinct parts, making the building look like three identical yet separate town houses. This made the large building fit better with the surrounding narrow mediaeval town houses. It was a common feature of many of van Obberghen's projects, notably the Grand Armoury and the Green Gate. In front of the façade stands a characteristic gilded railing.

The three parts of the façade are tied together by an inscription in the German language running right below the tops, reading "DIE AVF DEN HERRN HARREN KRIEGEN NEVE KRAFT DASS SIE AVFFAHREN MIT FLVEGELN WIE ADLER" (English: Those who trust in the Lord will find new strength. They will soar high on wings like eagles).

On 27 February 1967, the building was listed in the Cultural Heritage Register. It was fully restored and reconstructed in 1970. Currently, it houses the Regional Endocrinological Health Centre.
