= Mała Słupina =

Location
- Country: Poland

Physical characteristics
- Mouth
  - location: Radunia
  - coordinates: 54°20′23″N 18°21′21″E

Basin features
- Progression: Radunia→ Motława→ Martwa Wisła→ Baltic Sea

Mała Słupina is a river in Poland; a tributary of the Radunia near Żukowo.
