= 2001 flood in Gdańsk =

2001 flood which occurred in Gdańsk, Poland

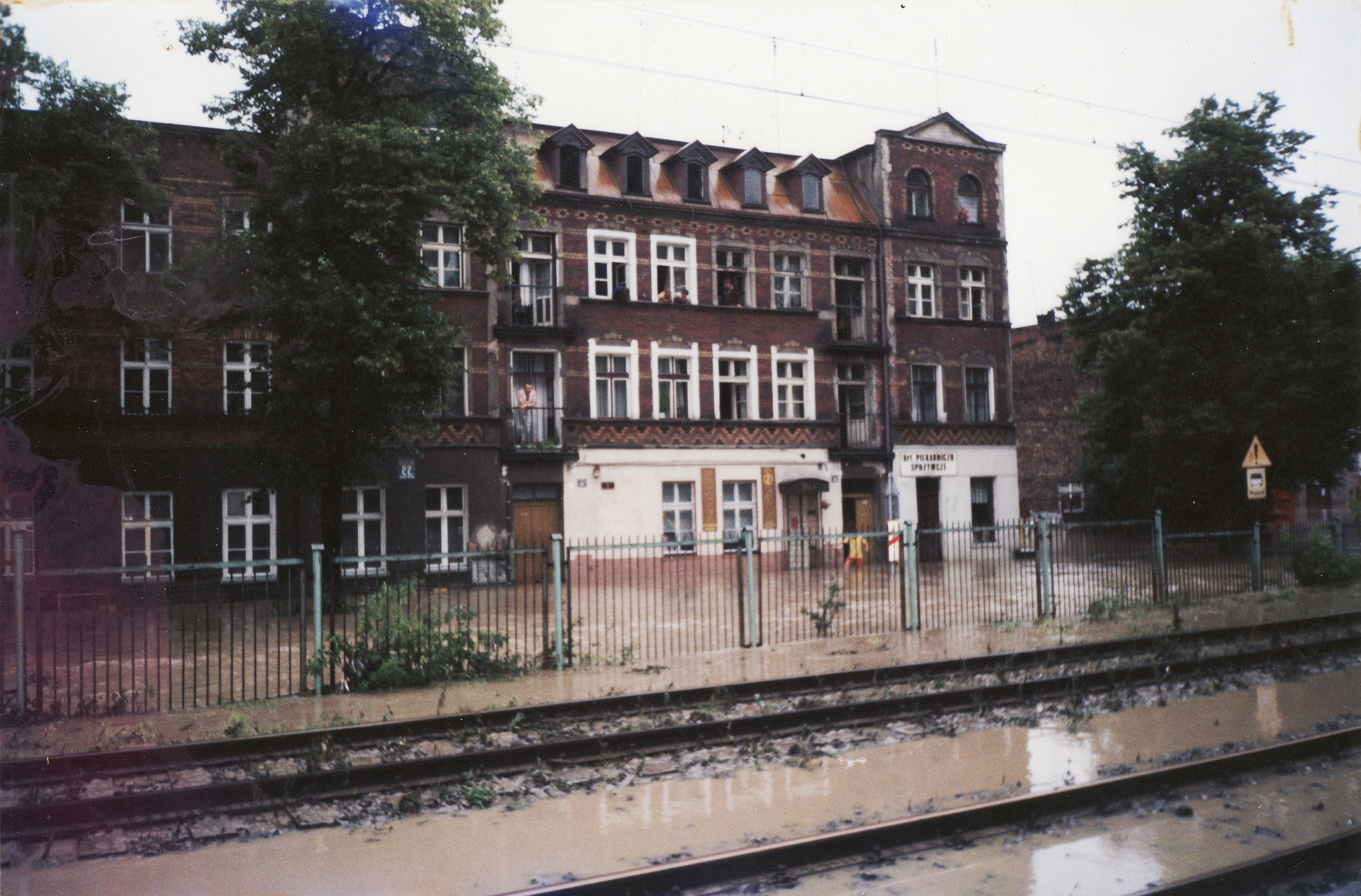
- Flooded railway tracks in Orunia
- Date: 9 July 2001
- Location: Orunia-Św. Wojciech-Lipce, Śródmieście, Wrzeszcz
- Deaths: 4
- Property damage: 200 million zł

The 2001 flood in Gdańsk, also known as the flood of the century (Polish: powódź stulecia), was a flood which affected the city of Gdańsk, Poland, on 9 July 2001, resulting in 4 deaths.

== Causes ==
In July 2001, several areas in and around the drainage basin of the Vistula experienced extremely intense rain and flooding. The amounts of rain certain areas received per day often exceed monthly totals.

The city of Gdańsk is found at the boundary of high- and low-lying areas, known as the Górny Taras and Dolny Taras in Polish respectively; whereas in the Górny Taras, altitudes reach upwards of 180 metres (590 ft) above sea level, in the Dolny Taras, they go down as low as 1.6 metres (5.2 ft) below sea level. These low altitudes render the Dolny Taras especially susceptible to flooding.

On Monday, 9 July 2001, around 15:00, Gdańsk began experiencing intense rain. Within two hours, 90 millimetres (3.5 in) had fallen per square metre of the city; the average amount of rain it experienced per month in total was 75 millimetres (3.0 in) per square metre. The Strzyża stream and Radunia Canal overflowed due to hydrotechnical equipment malfunctioning, and additional damage was done by water flowing down from the Górny Taras into the low-lying areas.

One of the key causes of the flood's intensity was the intense building-up of areas on the Górny Taras such as Piecki-Migowo and Ujeścisko-Łostowice since the 1980s, thus decreasing local water retention, but city authorities have denied this and instead have stated that the abnormally intense nature of the flooding was undoubtedly the most significant factor.

== Effects on individual districts ==
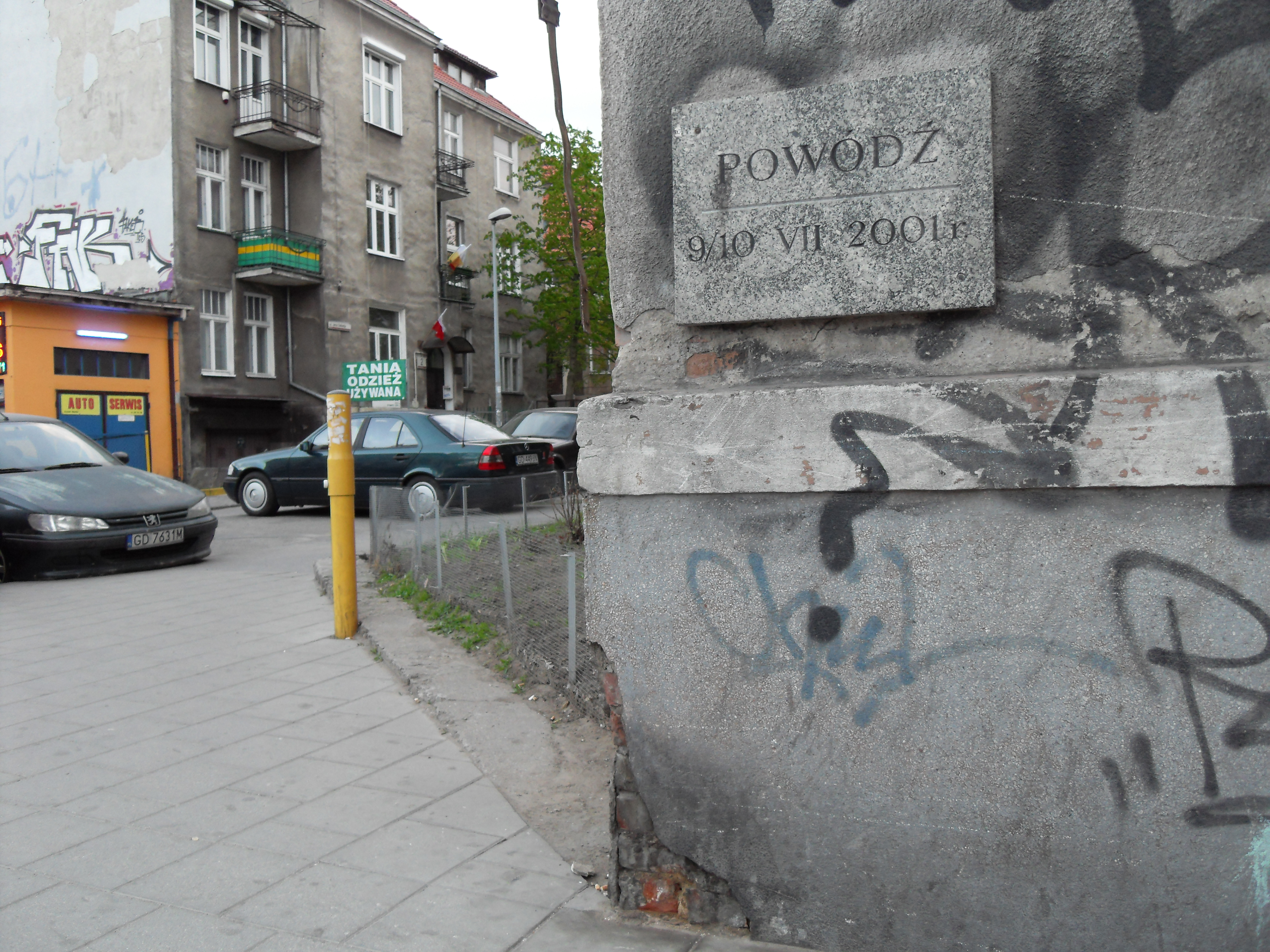
A high water mark in Wrzeszcz, denoting the water level there on 9 July 2001

=== Orunia-Św. Wojciech-Lipce ===
The 15th-century Radunia Canal runs through the district of Orunia-Św. Wojciech-Lipce. It is located on the boundary of the high- and low-lying areas, and collects water from the Górny Taras via the Potok Oruński, as well as other aquifers, with a flood embankment present on its western side. With the rapid influx of water from the city's higher-lying areas as the intense rain set in, the flow of water in the Canal greatly exceeded its recommended limit, resulting in the embankment being ruptured in several places and causing further flooding.

Most of the district to the east of the Radunia Canal was flooded, and in some buildings, the flooding reached above the ground floor.

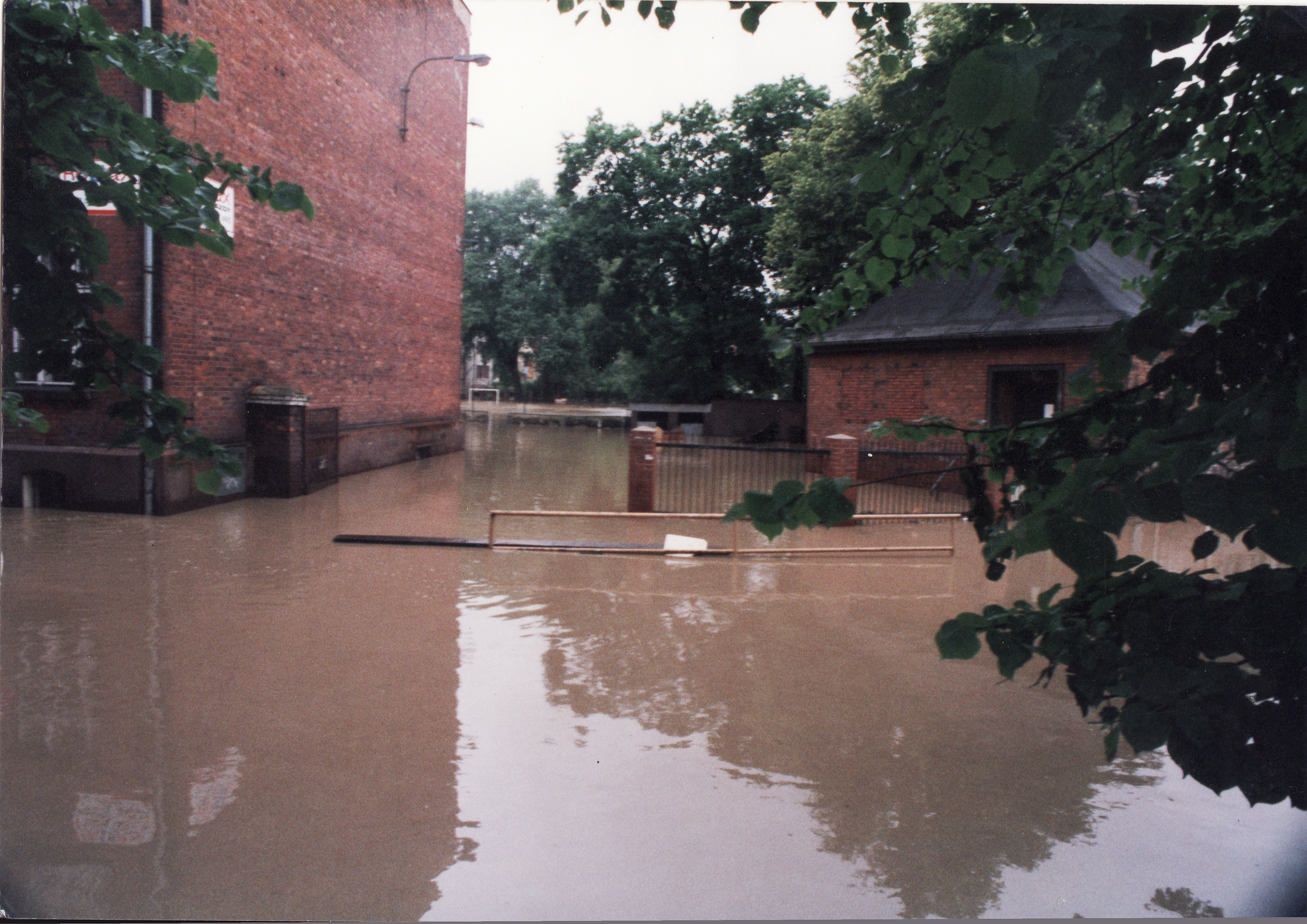
Flooding on Gościnna Street

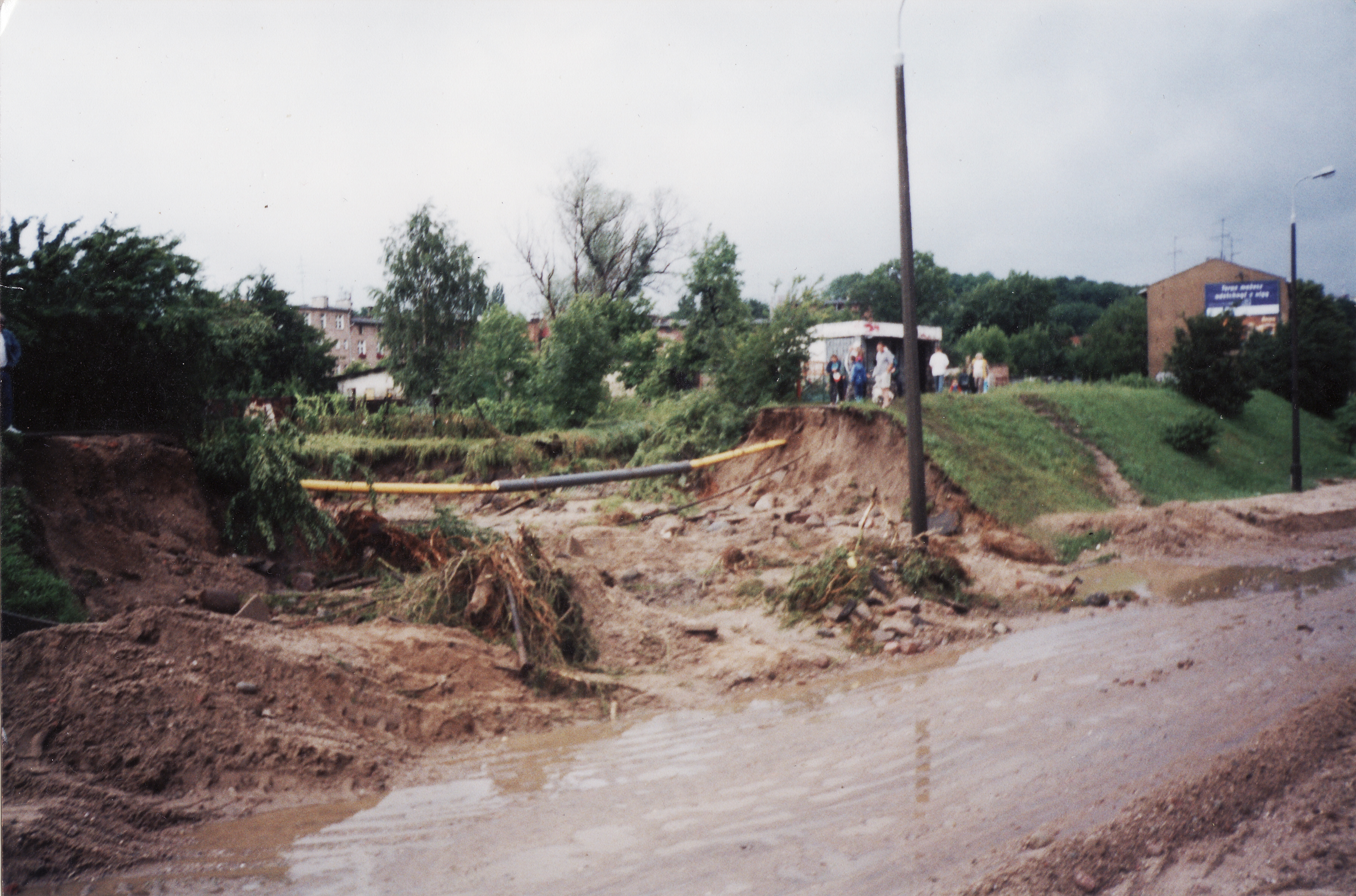
A ruptured flood embankment

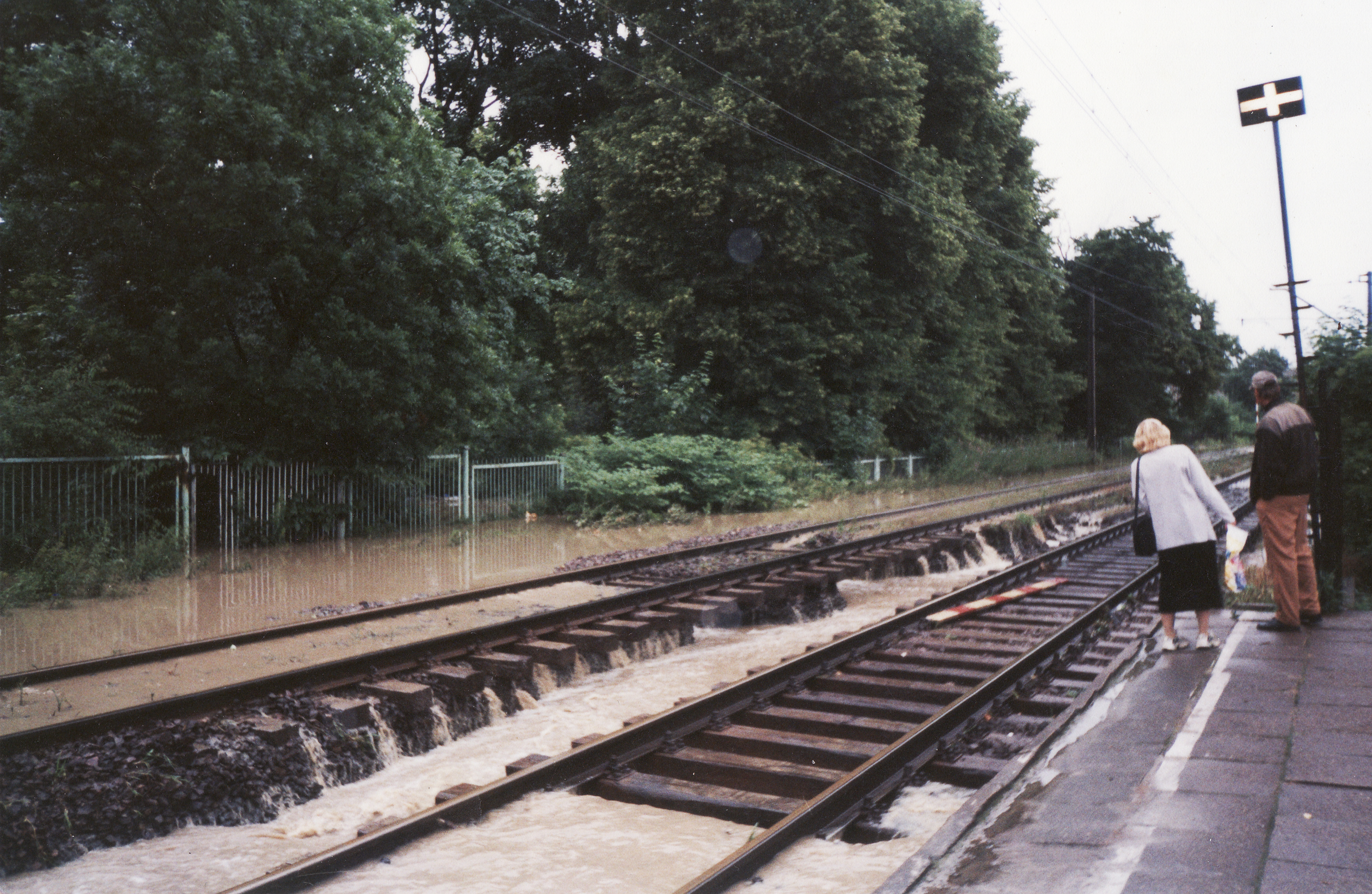
Flooding at Gdańsk Orunia railway station

=== Śródmieście ===
In Śródmieście, the Gdańsk Główny railway station was flooded, along with the city hall and the central administrative building of the Pomeranian Voivodeship.

=== Wrzeszcz ===
The aforementioned Strzyża stream flows through Wrzeszcz, originating in the Górny Taras, specifically in the Tricity Landscape Park. It also overflowed, flooding certain parts of the district.

== Consequences ==
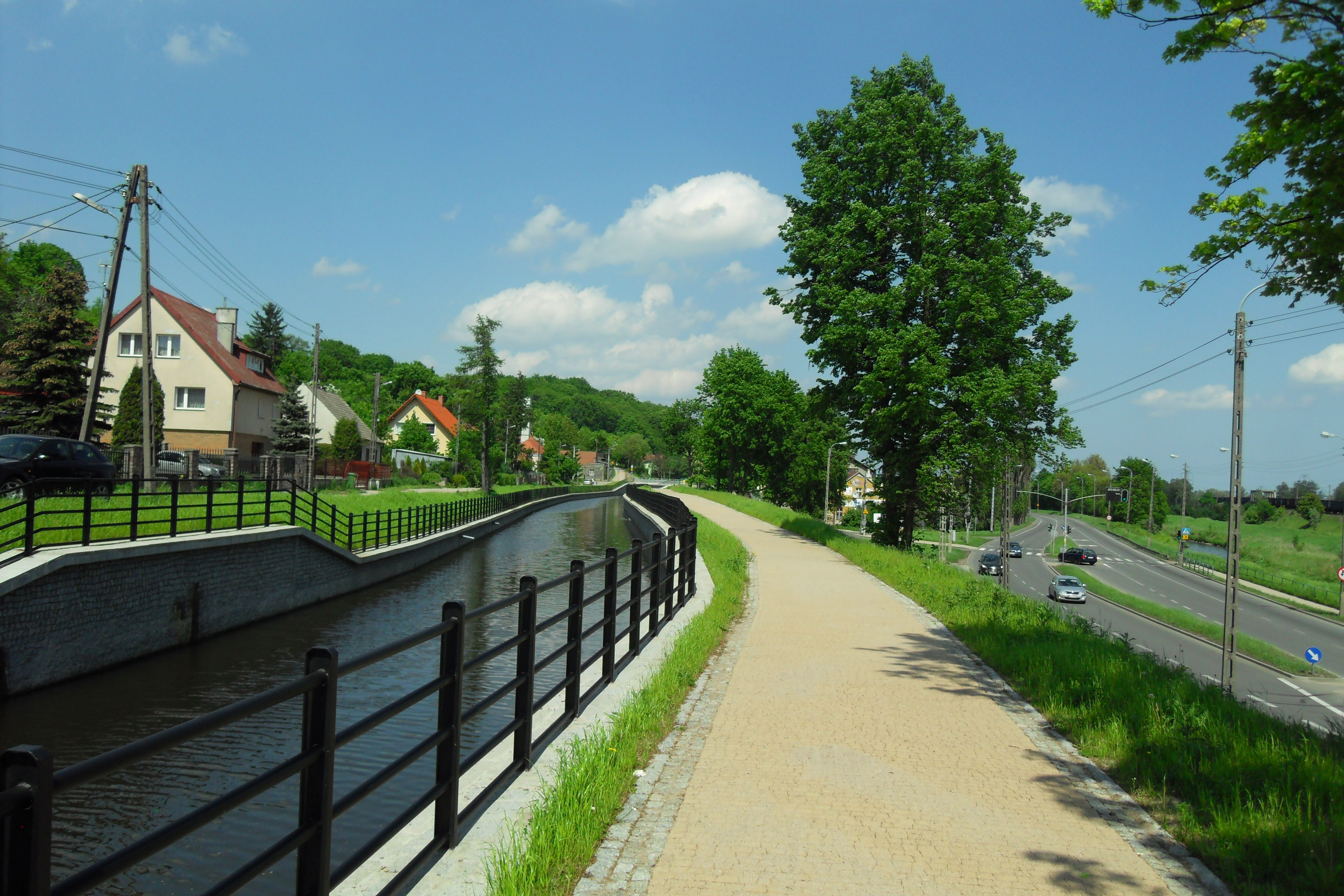
The revitalized Radunia Canal

4 people died as a result of the flood. The Trakt św. Wojciecha, a road heading alongside the Radunia Canal, was unusable for the next 18 days. 200 million zł was estimated in damages, and 2,000 people had to be evacuated. 1,200 housing units needed to be renovated, and 600 needed to be rebuilt. 134 buildings needed to be demolished because of the damage done to them; among them, many were historical. A total of 14 million zł was spent on clearing the city of damage following the flood.

The event also led to a series of investments into flood prevention infrastructure in Gdańsk. More than 50 reservoirs have been built across Gdańsk since 2001, accompanied by several rainwater pumping stations. From 2001 to 2011 alone, the city government of Gdańsk invested 150 million zł into flood prevention. The Radunia Canal was revitalized from 2011 to 2014. Alongside other elements of this investment, the flood embankment was reinforced with Larssen sheet piling.
