= Forum Gdańsk =

Modern shopping mall in Śródmieście, Gdańsk

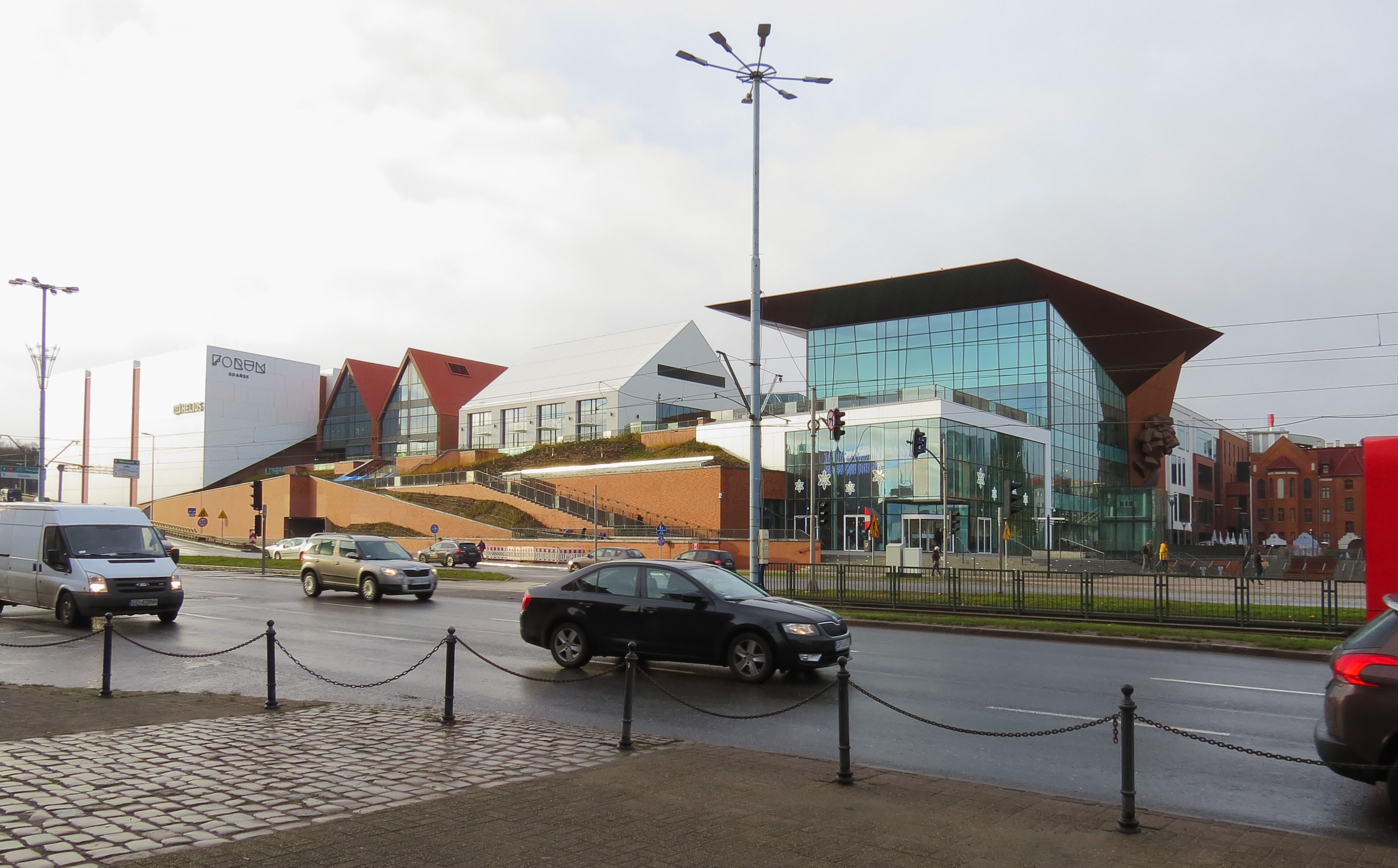
- View of Forum Gdańsk from the Jagiellon Shafts
- Location: Śródmieście, Gdańsk
- Address: Targ Sienny 7, 80-806 Gdańsk
- Opened: 26 May 2018
- Owner: Multi Poland
- Architect: Sud Architekt Polska
- Num. of stores: 200
- Floor area: 62,000 m^{2} (670,000 sq ft)
- Floors: 8
- Public transit: Direct access from Brama Wyżynna tram/bus stations
- Website: forumgdansk.pl

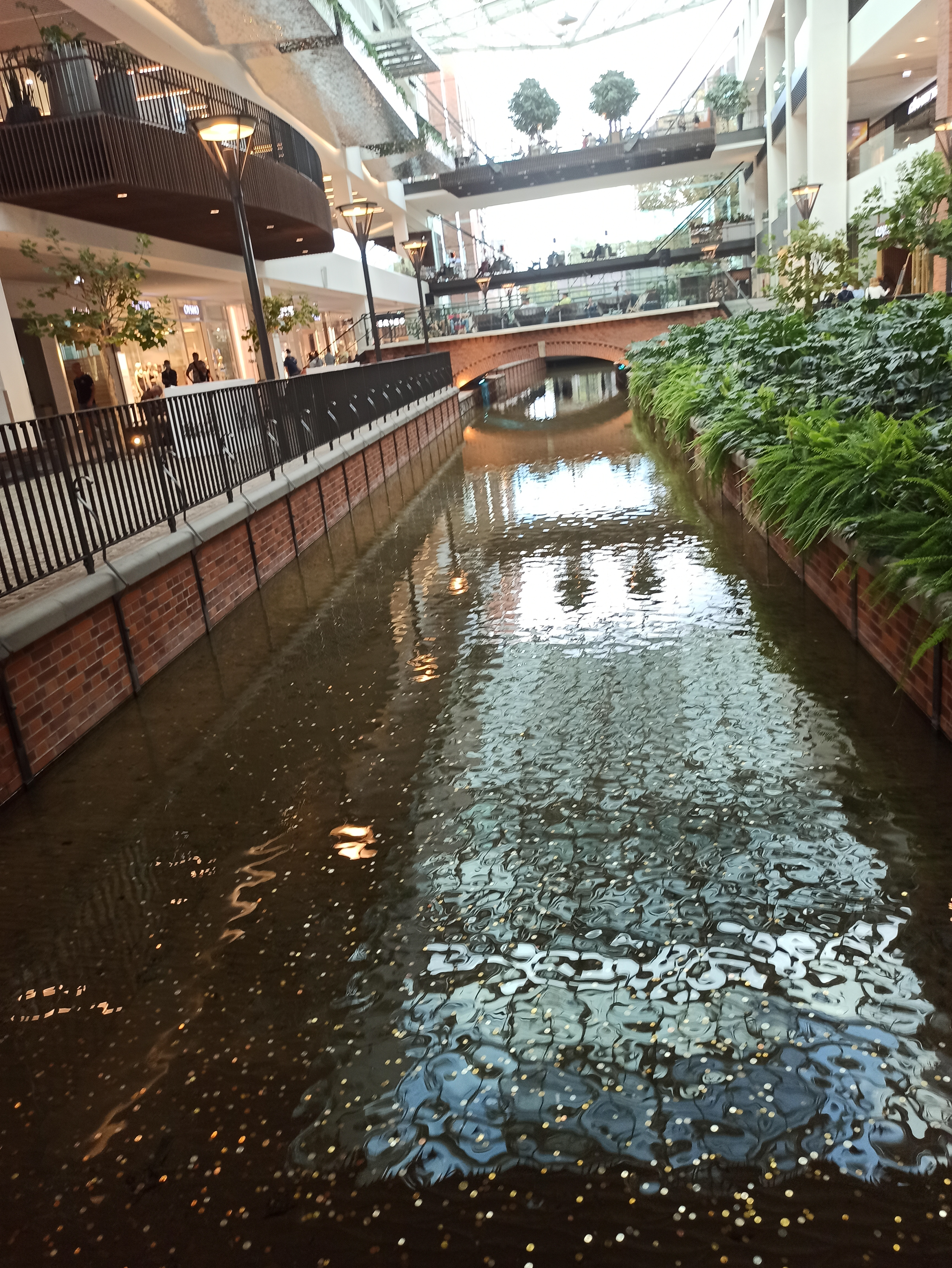
The Radunia Channel in Forum Gdańsk

Forum Gdańsk, often shortened to Forum (Polish pronunciation: [fɔrum ɡtaˈɲsk]) is a Polish shopping mall located in Gdańsk and opened in 2018.

== History ==
The mall was built on land formerly occupied by the Hay and Crayfish markets. The mall was originally called Forum Radunia.

== Design ==
The design of the mall is primarily modern. A channel of the Radunia flows through it, which is one of the defining traits of the mall. It is a building complex, as can be seen from the outside. On the upper floor, a Helios cinema occupies most of the area. It is divided into three zones; each has its own design.

== Doubts and controversies ==
Originally, the mall was supposed to be a group of smaller, more scattered buildings. After a change in the building plan, great opposition against it began, calling it "ignorant of the scale and character of Śródmieście".

Forum Gdańsk was planned to be opened on 16 May 2018, though the building did not have the permission to open, so it was delayed. After two days of silence, on 18 May, the opening date was announced as the 25th due to a great number of people waiting for the mall to open.

There was a major legal controversy surrounding the Radunia Channel and the preservation of its status as a monument. After a year-long legal battle regarding the definition of monument in Polish law, the (at this time, covered) channel was filled with water in November 2019.

== Access ==
Forum Gdańsk is located within walking distance north of Gdańsk Śródmieście railway station.
