= Old Town Hall, Gdańsk =

Building in Śródmieście, Gdańsk, Poland

Old Town Hall
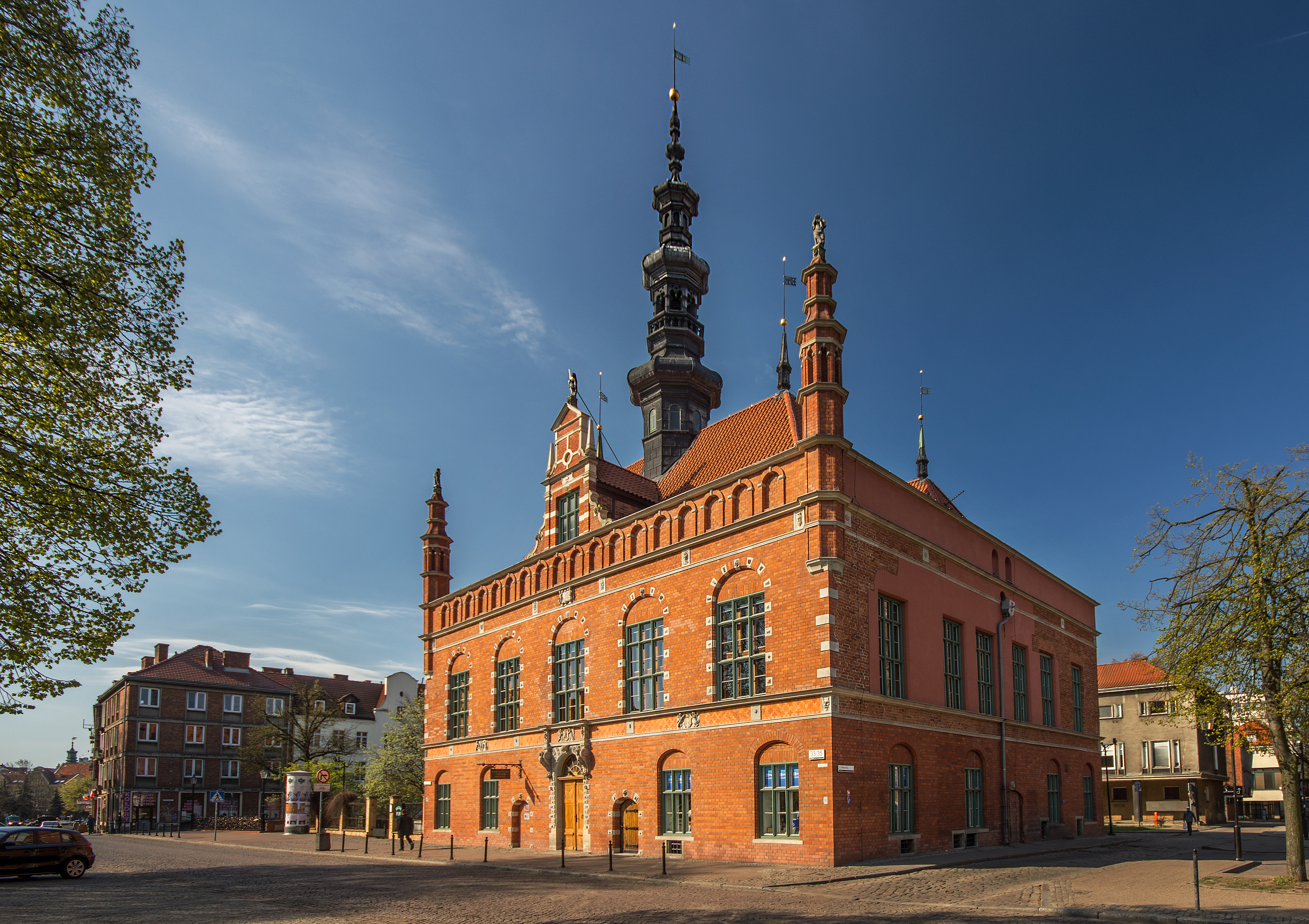
- The building in 2016
- Interactive map of the Old Town Hall area

General information
- Architectural style: Mannerist
- Location: ul. Korzenna 33–35; Śródmieście, Gdańsk
- Coordinates: 54°21′14″N 18°38′53″E
- Year built: 1587–1595
- Completed: 1595
- Owner: Baltic Centre of Culture

Technical details
- Floor count: 2

Design and construction
- Architect: Anthonis van Obbergen

The Old Town Hall (Polish: Ratusz Starego Miasta; Ratusz Staromiejski) is a 16th-century building in Gdańsk that housed the local government of the Old Town from 1595 to 1793 and then of Gdańsk as a whole from 1915 to 1945, among many other roles. Today, it houses the Baltic Centre of Culture. It is on the regional heritage list.

== Characteristics ==
The building is located at ul. Korzenna 33–35, in the Old Town, in the vicinity of the Radunia Canal. Built in a Mannerist style influenced by Dutch architecture of the 16th century, it forms a rough square with sides measuring approximately 24 metres (79 ft) and is divided into two main sections down a central line. Significant decorations are largely minimal and simplistic. The building's corners are equipped with turrets, whilst a central tower emerges above the portal.

Exhibits within the building include the historic vestibule of the building and the accompanying Great Hall, also known as the Citizens' Hall, as well as the 17th-century Mayor's Cabinet. The Old Town Hall is opened daily to visitors and frequently hosts shows and temporary exhibitions.

== History ==
The first known city hall of the Old Town was erected on the Old Town Hall's current site in 1382. It was expanded in the 15th century. In 1587, due to the risk of the original 14th-century structure collapsing, the Old Town Council took out a loan from the council of the Main City and built a new hall building, designed by Flemish architect Anthonis van Obbergen. The building was initially sparsely decorated, both from the exterior and interior; the most flamboyantly decorated room was the Great Chamber of the Council. The Chamber's tables and benches included extensive carvings, covered in red fabric by around the 17th century, and accompanied by new Baroque furniture and portrait paintings of notables in the 17th and 18th.

The most famous person linked to the Old Town Hall was astronomer and selenographer Johannes Hevelius, a city councillor and mayor of Gdańsk, who rented the building's large basements to store the beers he brewed. In 1793, after the Second Partition of Poland and the seizure of Gdańsk by the Kingdom of Prussia, the Old Town Hall stopped serving its original role. A lottery was housed in the building's main hall, whilst the first floor was divided into apartments for rent.

From 1806 to 1807, and from 1813 to 1910, the building was in the hands of the city's judicial authorities and housed the city court. It was retaken by the city of Danzig in 1910. During the 19th century, it was repeatedly refurnished and renovated, and after it was taken by the city, it was lavishly decorated and meant to play the role of a wedding palace, but this was interrupted by the beginning of World War I. From 1915 onwards, it housed the Danzig city government, and also the architectural division of the Senate of the Free City of Danzig and the Free City's conservator.

The Old Town hall survived World War II and specifically the Siege of Danzig largely undamaged. It was first occupied by the Voivodeship National Council, hosting its first session in June 1945, and then by the City National Council, hosting its first session in the summer of 1946. Up to 1954, it was also occupied by the City Committee of the National Front, the Economic Association of Coastal Cities, the Western Lands Development Society, and the Pomeranian History Division of the Polish Academy of Sciences.

Starting in 1954, the building housed the Culture Division of the City National Council, which operated the Voivodeship House of Folk Art there. In 1971, a café, Staromiejska, was opened in its basement, and in 1992, the Baltic Centre of Culture began taking care of it; it today houses various exhibits related to the history of the building and the city as a whole. It was restored to its early-20th-century state in 2016.
