= Old Town, Gdańsk =

Stare Miasto
- Quarter (dzielnica)
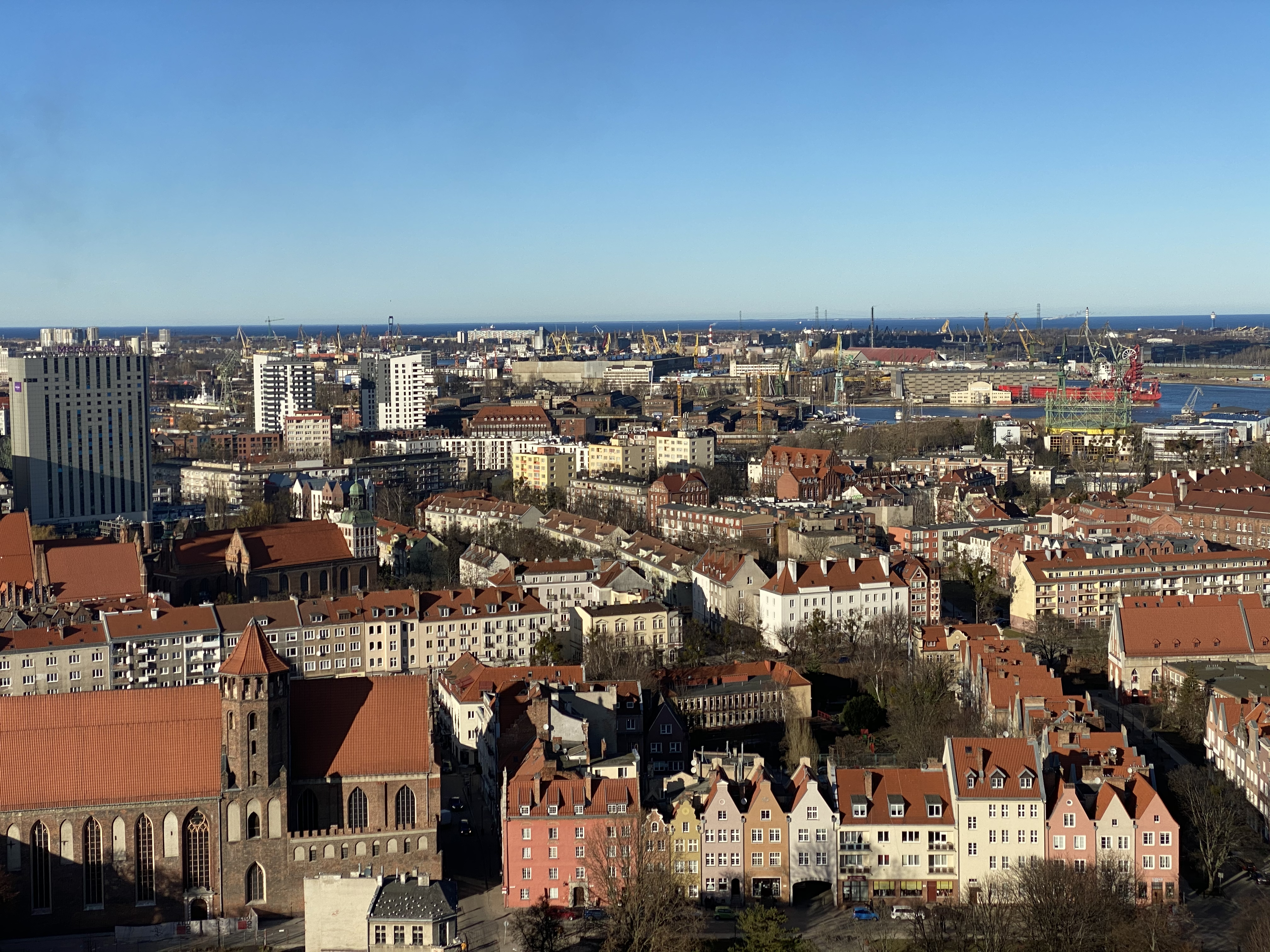
- Skyline of the Old Town, 2021

- Location of Stare Miasto within Śródmieście, Gdańsk
- Coordinates: 54°21′14″N 18°38′55″E
- Country: Poland
- Voivodeship: Pomeranian
- City: Gdańsk
- District: Śródmieście
- Time zone: UTC+1 (CET)
  - Summer (DST): UTC+2 (CEST)
- Vehicle registration: GD

Historic Monument of Poland
- Designated: 1994-09-08
- Part of: Gdańsk – city within the 17th-century fortifications
- Reference no.: M.P. 1994 nr 50 poz. 415

The Old Town (Polish: Stare Miasto; German: Altstadt) is a quarter (osiedle) of Śródmieście, a district of Gdańsk. It is the oldest area of the city to be granted city rights or privileges.

== History ==
The Old Town was the location of a small fortified settlement by 970 and 980, and it comprised the majority and central section of the city of Gdańsk for much of its early history. In 1308, it was destroyed and burnt amidst the Gdańsk massacre, carried out by the Teutonic Order, slowly recovering, mostly as a suburb to the nearby Main City, which became the more important location in Gdańsk after 1308.

As of 1495, 3,655 people lived in the Old Town, which had increased to 31,250 by 1880 and 37,586 by 1917. The area was impoverished, and it suffered from significant destruction during the siege of Danzig in 1945. Some historical buildings, such as the Great Mill, were restored. Several commercial buildings, mostly shops and shopping malls, have been built in the Old Town since the 1980s.

== Notable sights ==
Notable sights in the Old Town include the historic Old Town Hall in Gdańsk, completed in the 16th century, the 14th-century Great Mill, the preserved medieval House of the Pelplin Abbots, the Polish Post Office, famously defended on 1 September 1939, as well as its museum, the early-20th-century Gdańsk Główny railway station, the Mannerist Preachers' House, the tall Monument to the Fallen Shipyard Workers of 1970, the equestrian King John III Sobieski Monument, and the Radunia Canal, a 14th-century canal connecting two rivers, the Radunia and Motława.

== Gallery ==
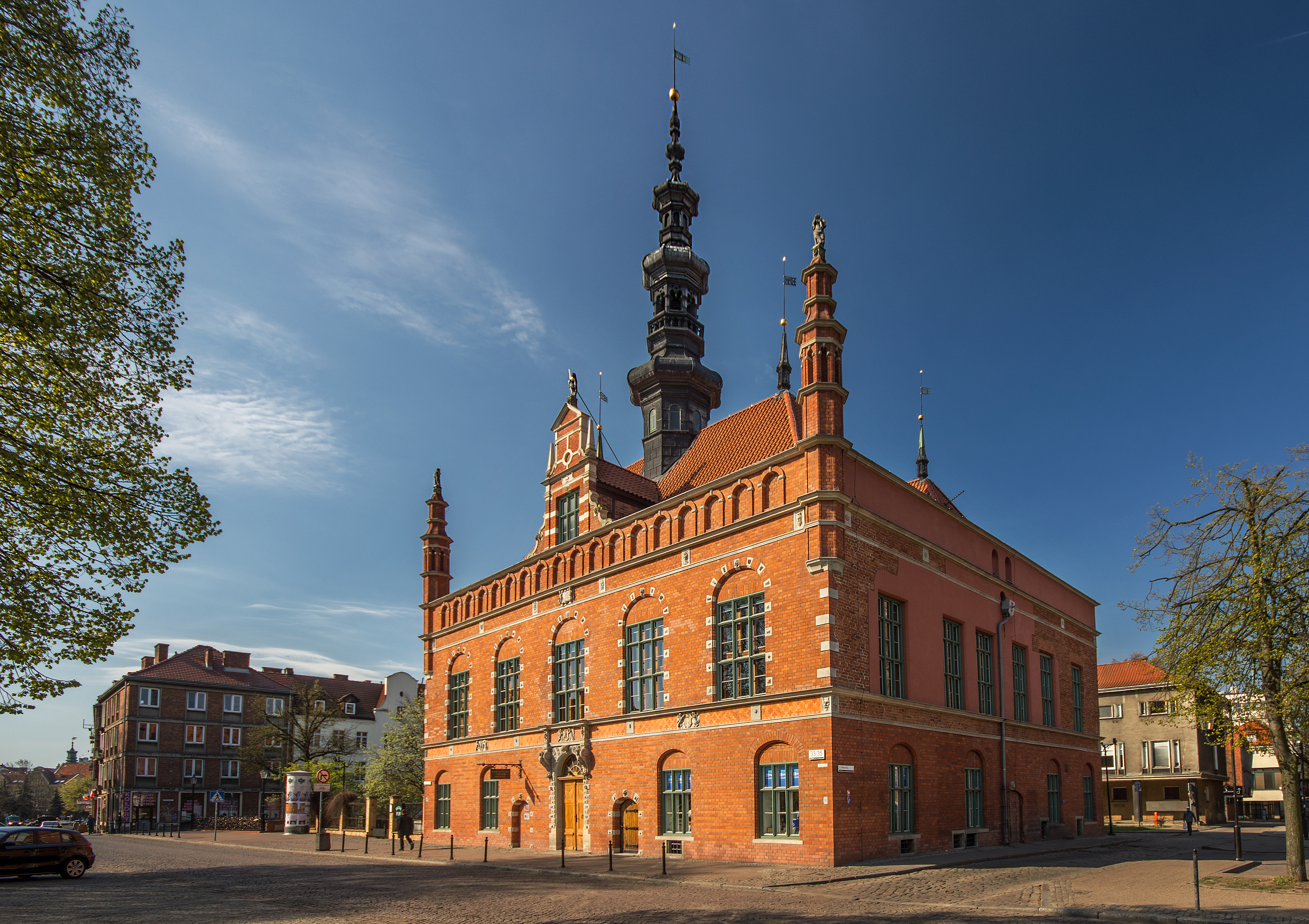
Old Town Hall

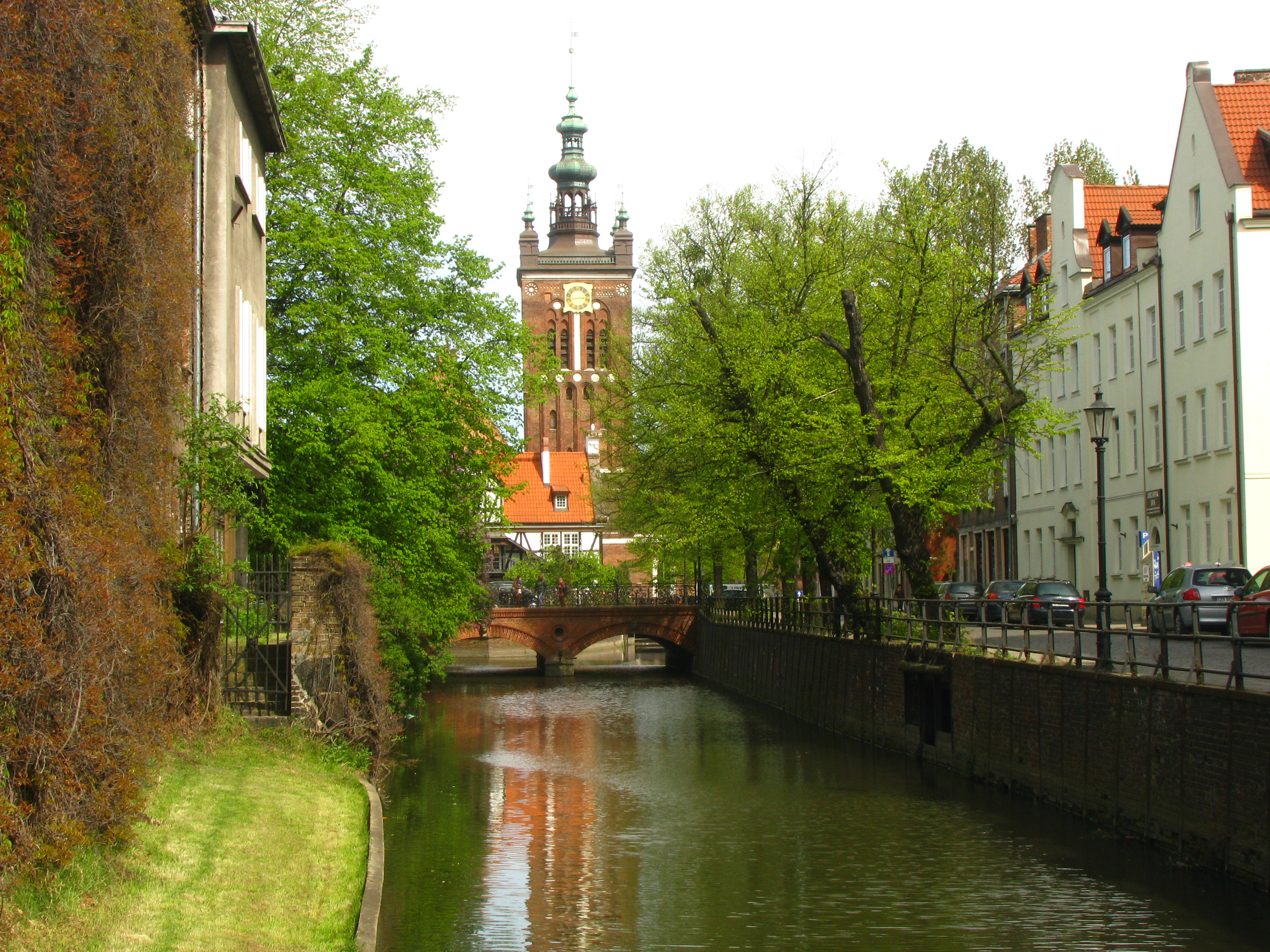
Radunia Canal and St. Catherine's Church

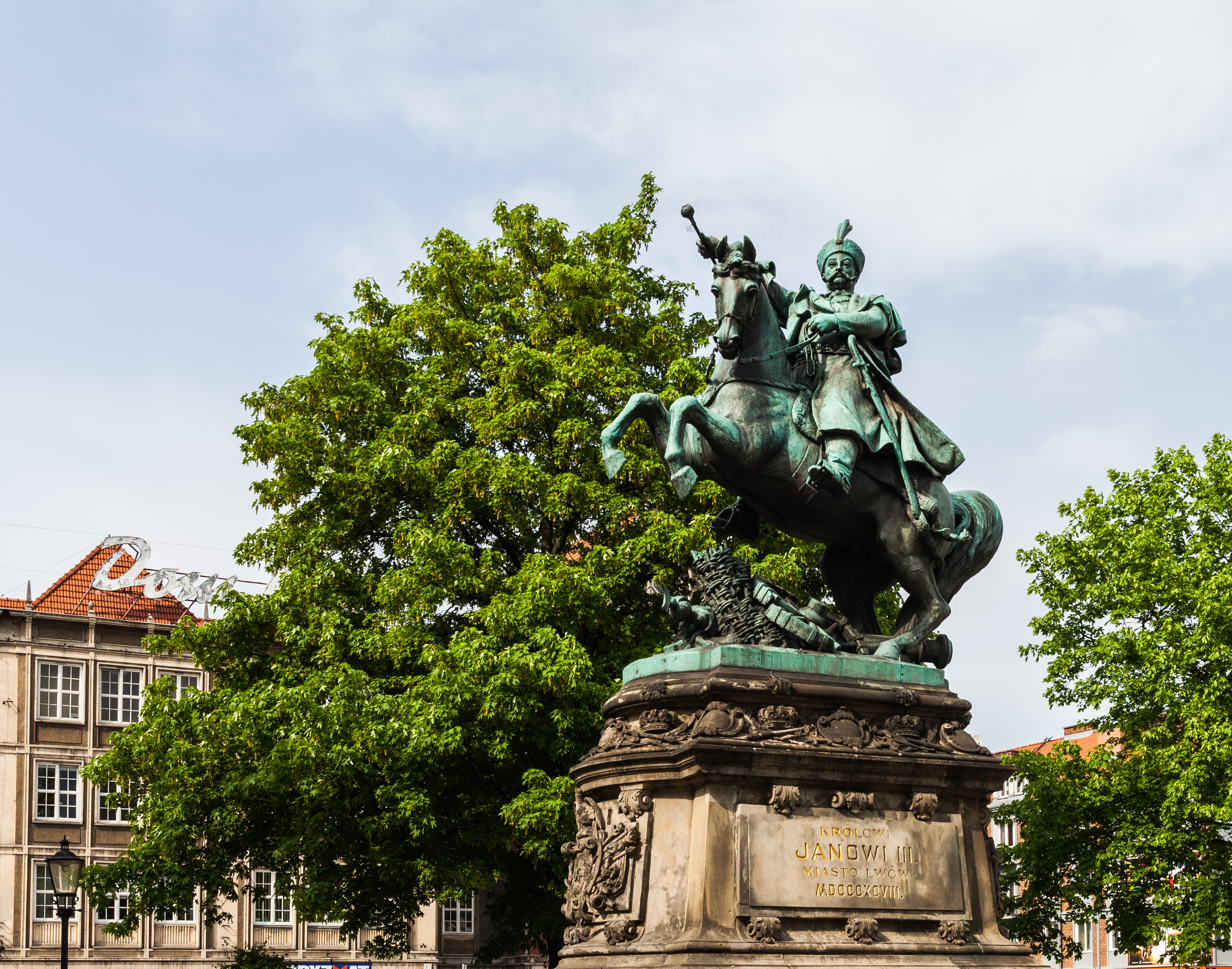
Monument of King John III Sobieski

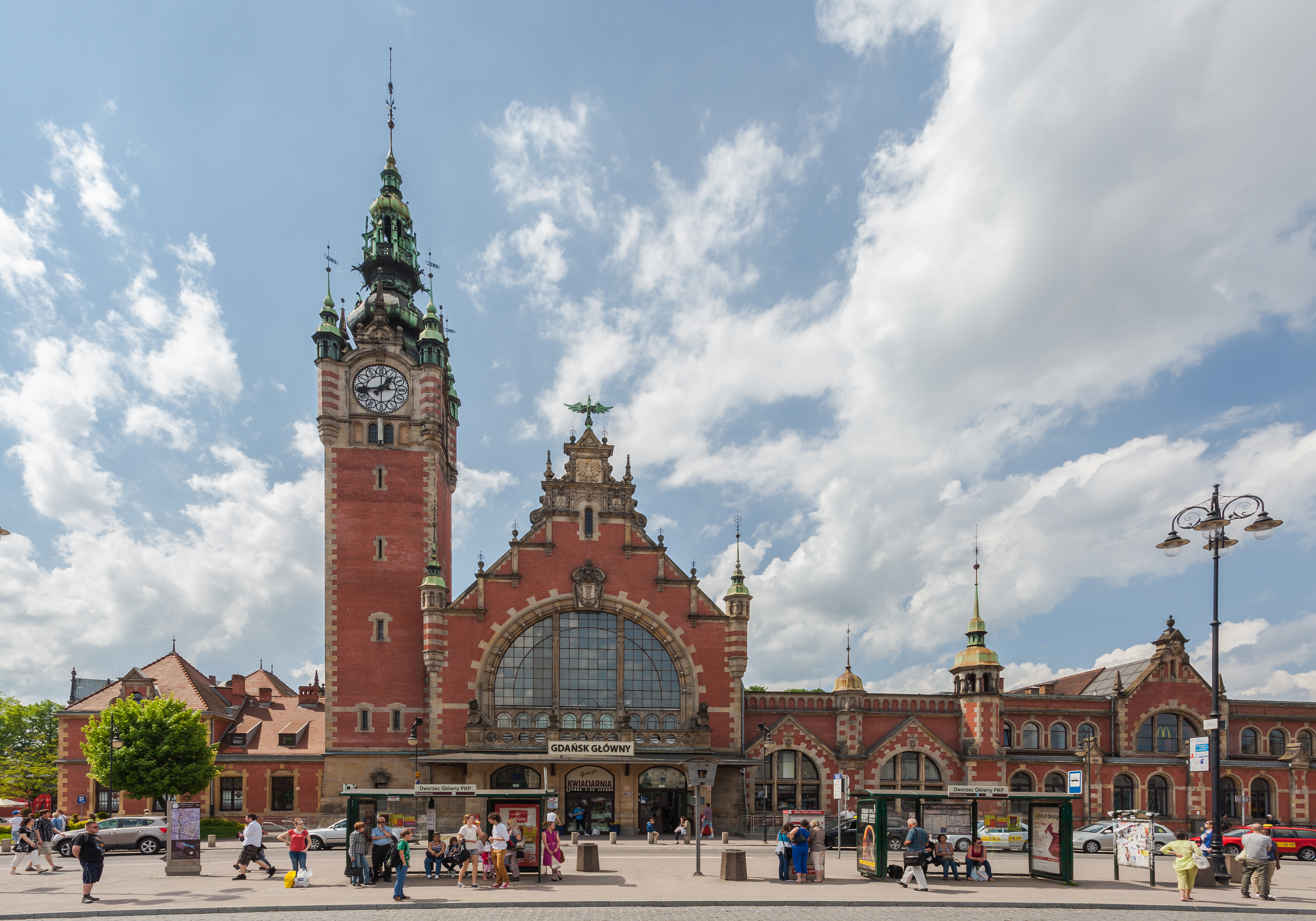
Gdańsk Główny railway station
