= Radunia Canal =

Canal in Gdańsk, Poland

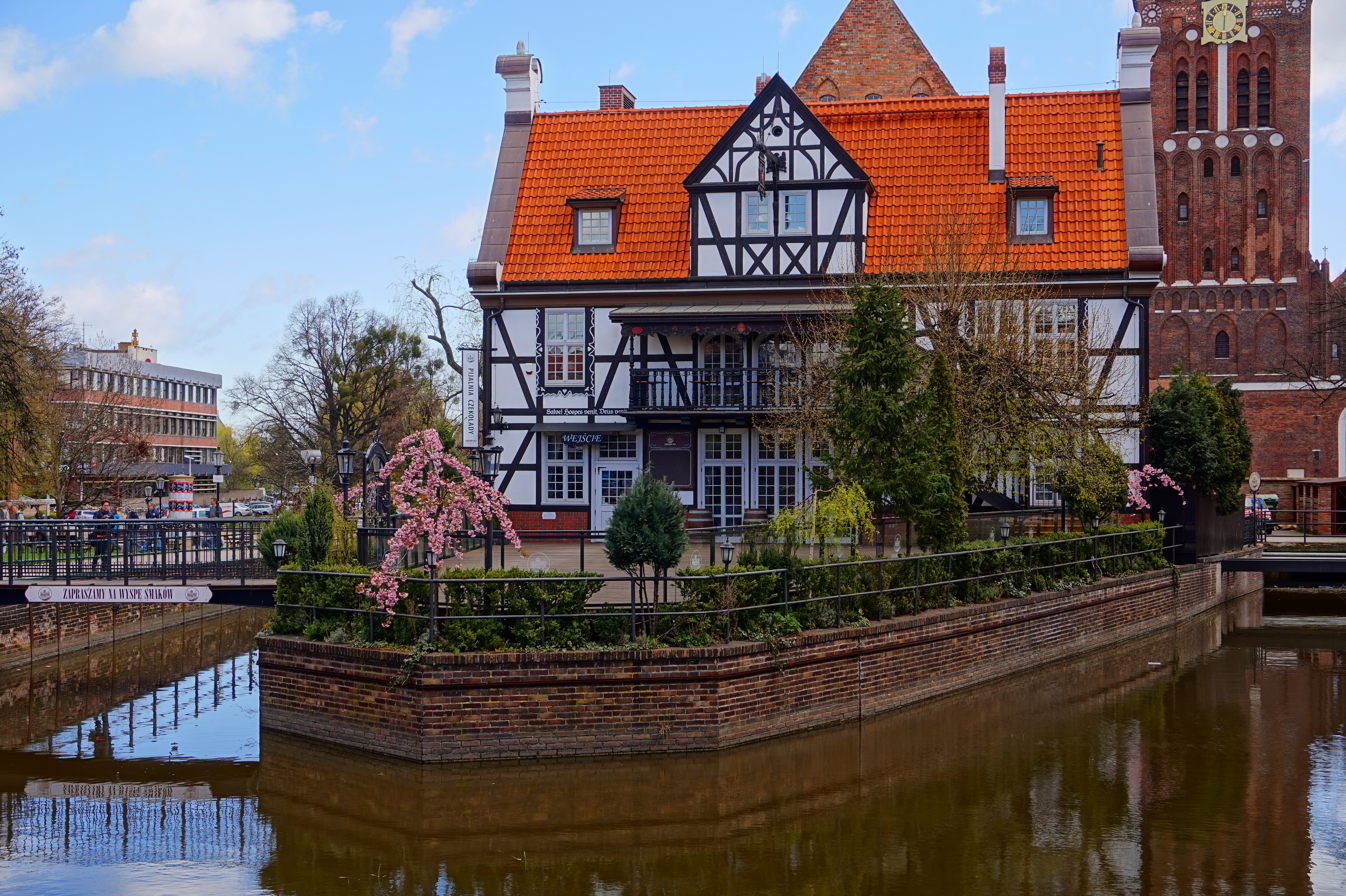
- The Radunia Canal near the Wielki Młyn (Great Mill)
- Interactive map of Radunia Canal
- Location: Gdańsk, Pruszcz Gdański
- Country: Poland
- Coordinates: 54.3547°N 18.6618°E

Specifications
- Length: 13.5 km (8.4 miles)
- Average depth: 2 metres (6.6 ft)

History
- Date completed: 1356
- Date restored: 2011–2015

Geography
- Start point: Pruszcz Gdański
- End point: Old Town, Gdańsk
- Beginning coordinates: 54.2503°N 18.6224°E
- Ending coordinates: 54.3547°N 18.6618°E
- Connects to: Motława

The Radunia Canal (Polish: Kanał Raduni; German: Radaunekanal) is a historic canal completed in 1356 connecting the Radunia and Motława rivers, flowing through the cities of Pruszcz Gdański and Gdańsk in Poland. It is listed on the regional heritage list.

== History ==
The canal's course was dug out in 1338, and the canal itself was dug out between 1348 and 1356 by the State of the Teutonic Knights, which ruled Gdańsk (then known as Danzig) at the time. It had two main purposes: powering the mills along its path and delivering drinking water to the city's inhabitants.

Up to the 1640s, the canal flowed directly into the Vistula, but was redirected to flow into the Motława instead. From 1539 to 1852, the Wasserkunst in Danzig, a pumping station which brought in drinking water from Jasień Lake, was found on the canal's shores.

On 9 July 2001, during the 2001 flood in Gdańsk, the canal overflowed, flooding the districts of Orunia-Św. Wojciech-Lipce and Śródmieście.

== Path ==
The Canal begins in Pruszcz Gdański, near the village of Juszkowo, and continues straight north through Pruszcz. At the northern border of the city of Pruszcz, as it enters Gdańsk proper, it loses its straight shape and continues with a winding course up to the quarter (osiedle) of Św. Wojciecha. During that portion of the route, the Rotmanka Stream flows into it. It then returns to a straight course through Orunia and Lipce, with the Orunia Stream flowing into it. In Zaroślak, it is linked to the Opływ Motławy.

It then goes underground, flowing under railway lines and briefly being visible inside the shopping mall Forum Gdańsk and eventually emerging in the Old Town, where it flows through two mills (the Mały Młyn and Wielki Młyn, the latter of which was Europe's largest industrial plant during the Middle Ages), takes a turn, and flows into the Motława.

== Modernization ==
In 2011, a project began to modernize the Radunia Canal. Elements of the project included construction of shore protections, the strengthening and sealing of flood embankments, the reconstruction of several pedestrian bridges, and removal of sewage and water piping networks that moved through it. It was projected to cost 130 million zł. The project was completed in several phases, being partly completed in 2012 and fully in 2015.

In 2016 and 2017, two bridges across the Canal were built in Pruszcz Gdański. In 2018, a bridge in Orunia, carrying traffic on Starogardzka Street, was renovated. The most recently-built bridge was completed in 2020, also in Orunia-Św. Wojciech-Lipce, near the old Ferber Manor.
