= Radunia =

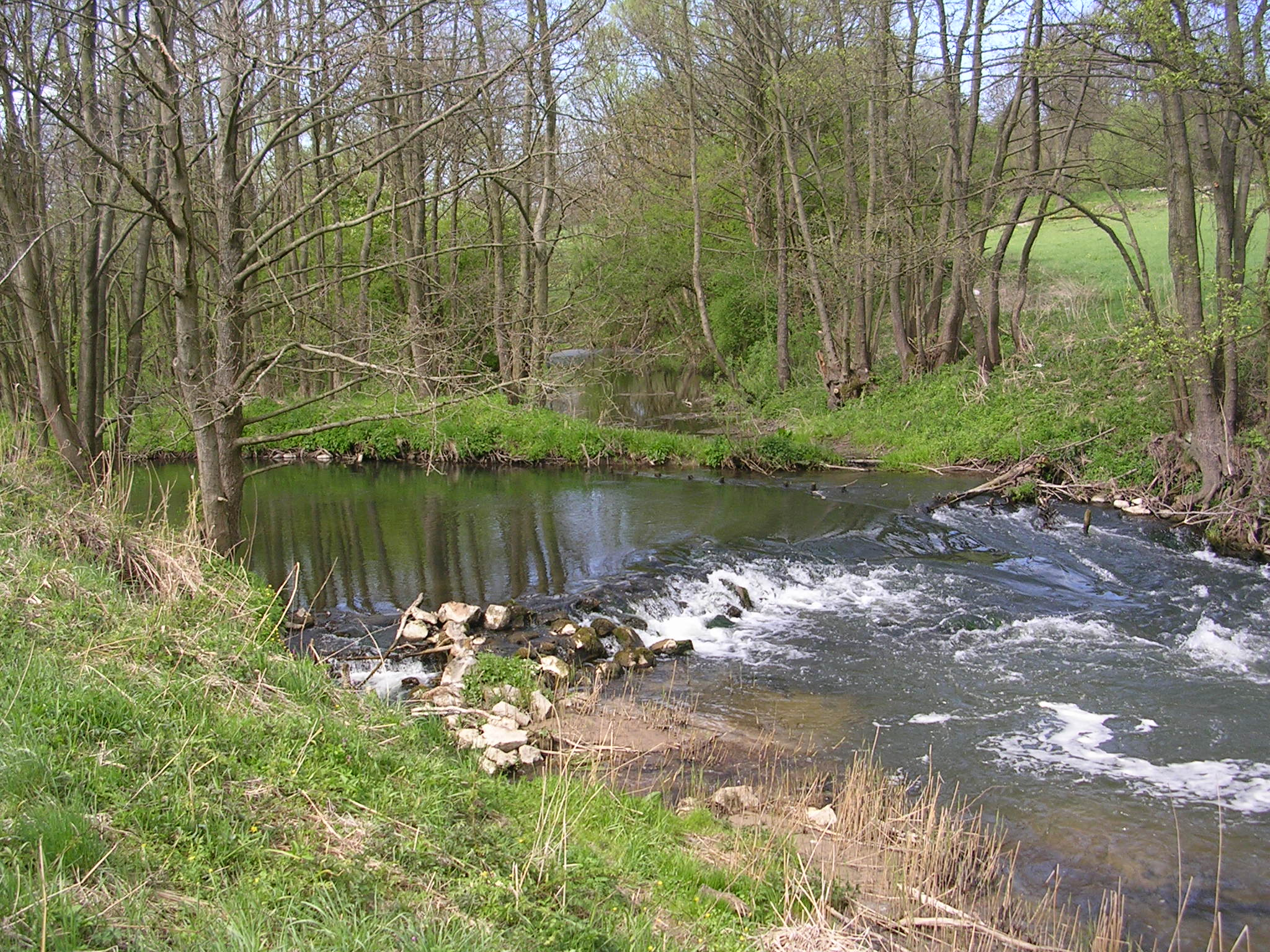
- Radunia River near the village of Lniska

- Location of the mouth in Poland

Location
- Country: Poland
- Voivodeship: Pomeranian

Physical characteristics
- Source
  - coordinates: 54°10′57″N 17°56′31″E
- Mouth
  - location: Motława
  - coordinates: 54°18′41″N 18°41′07″E

Basin features
- Progression: Motława→ Martwa Wisła→ Baltic Sea

The Radunia (German: Radaune; Kashubian: Reduniô) is a small river in Kashubia (Pomerelia) in northern Poland, which issues from a lake and falls into the Motława near the city of Gdańsk.

Part of its water is conveyed into the city via the 13.5 km long Radunia Canal (Kanał Raduni (pl) / Radaunekanal (de)) or New Radaune, a canal built in the 14th century by Teutonic Knights, to provide water and power to operate the Great Mill.

Its source is Lake Stężyckie near Stężyca. Near Krępiec, the Radunia joins the Motława, a tributary to the Vistula in Gdańsk. The length of the Radunia is 103,2 km, area 837 km², with a height difference of 162 m. Places along the river are Żukowo and Pruszcz Gdański, with 22,000 inhabitants.

From 1910 to 1937, eight water power stations were built, delivering 14 MW in total.

== Literature ==
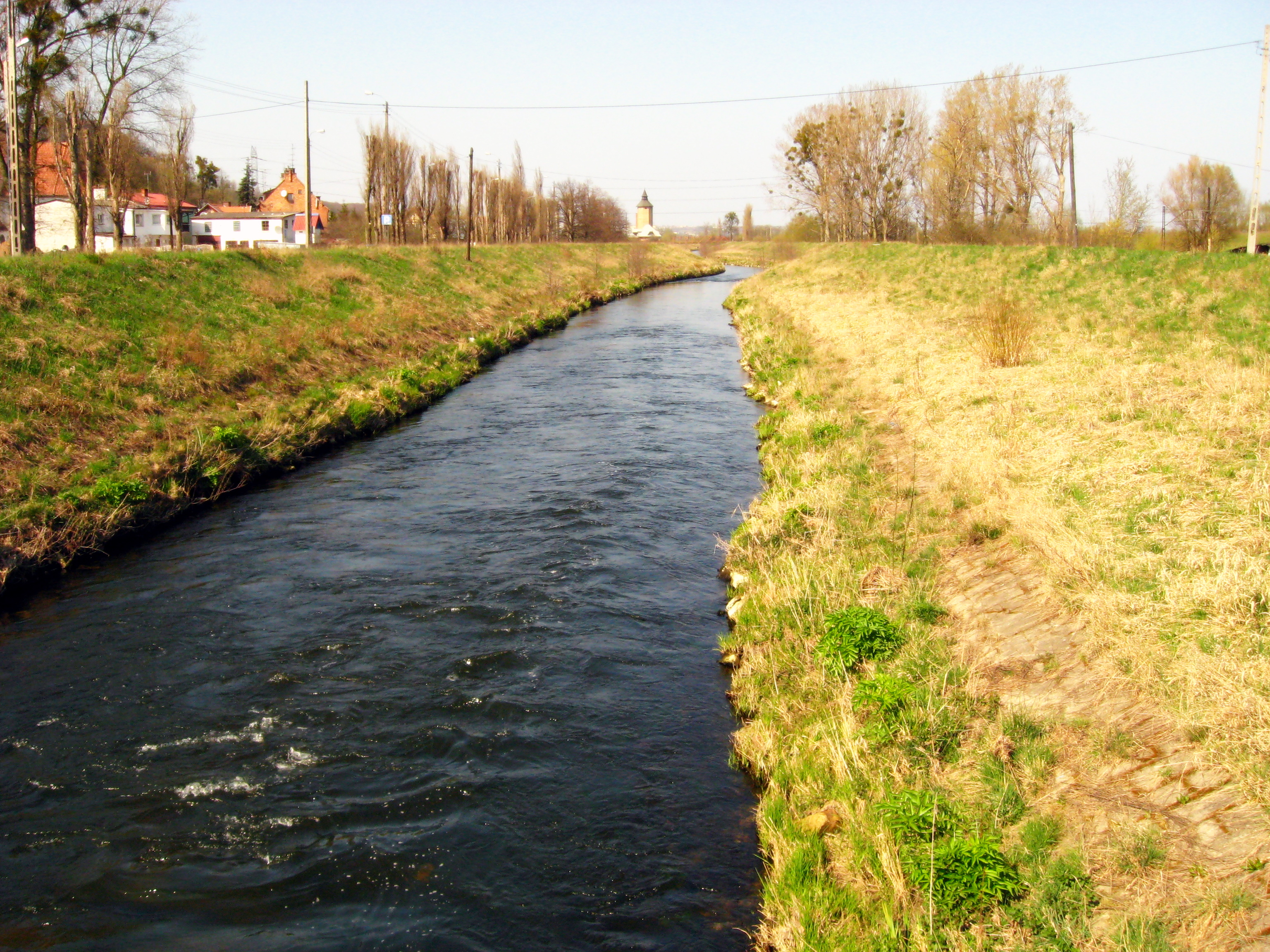
Radunia in Gdańsk

- Wilhelm Brauer, Prußische Siedlungen westlich der Weichsel: Versuch einer etymologischen Deutung heimatlicher Flurnamen, J.-G.-Herder-Bibliothek Siegerland, Siegen 1983
- Karl Pernin, Wanderungen durch die sogen : Kassubei und die Tuchler Haide als Beiträge zur Landeskenntniss gewidmet seinen westpreussischen Landsleuten, den Turnern und allen Freunden der Natur, Verlag und Druck von A. W. Kafemann, Danzig 1886

== See also ==
- Mała Słupina
