= Great Mill, Gdańsk =

Great Mill
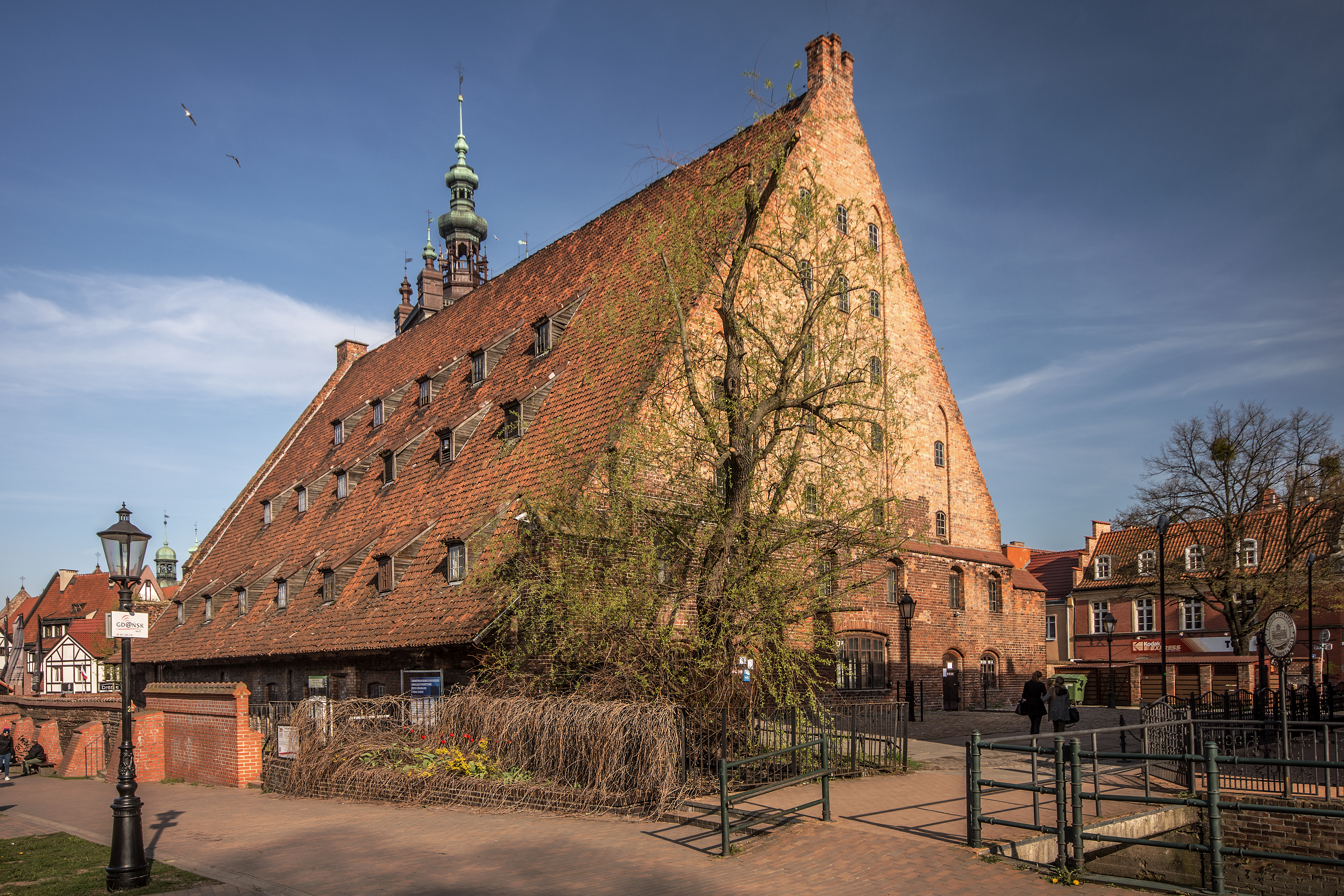

General information
- Address: ul. Wielkie Młyny 16; Old Town, Śródmieście, Gdańsk
- Coordinates: 54.3540°N 18.6500°E
- Completed: 1350
- Renovated: After 1962
- Owner: Gdańsk Museum

Technical details
- Floor count: 4
- Floor area: 2,300 m^{2} (25,000 sq ft)

The Great Mill (Polish: Wielki Młyn; German: Große Mühle) is a 14th-century watermill located in the Old Town of Gdańsk, powered by the Radunia Canal. It was built in 1350 and functioned as a watermill until 1945. It was then a multi-purpose building and shopping mall, and since 2021, it contains an amber museum. It is listed on the regional heritage list.

== History ==
The Great Mill was built by the State of the Teutonic Order in 1350 atop a newly-created artificial island. The mill, measuring 26 metres (85 ft) in height, 26 metres (85 ft) in width, and 41 metres (135 ft) in length, was powered by 18 water wheels. It fulfilled the roles of a watermill, a granary, and a bakery. Above the two floors of quern-stones, six floors of granaries were found.

The mill remained in operation, being upgraded with (among other equipment) water turbines and producing flour until it was destroyed during the siege of Danzig in 1945. It was renovated after 1962, being 80% authentic. It became a multi-purpose building, with features up until 1992 including a Pewex and amusement arcade. The building then functioned as a shopping mall until 2016.

In December 2016, the building was handed over to the Amber Museum in Gdańsk, which had possessed a smaller building that it had trouble fitting its exhibitions into. It was renovated starting in late 2018 for a total of 33.5 million zł and the museum was opened on 24 July 2021.

== Gallery ==
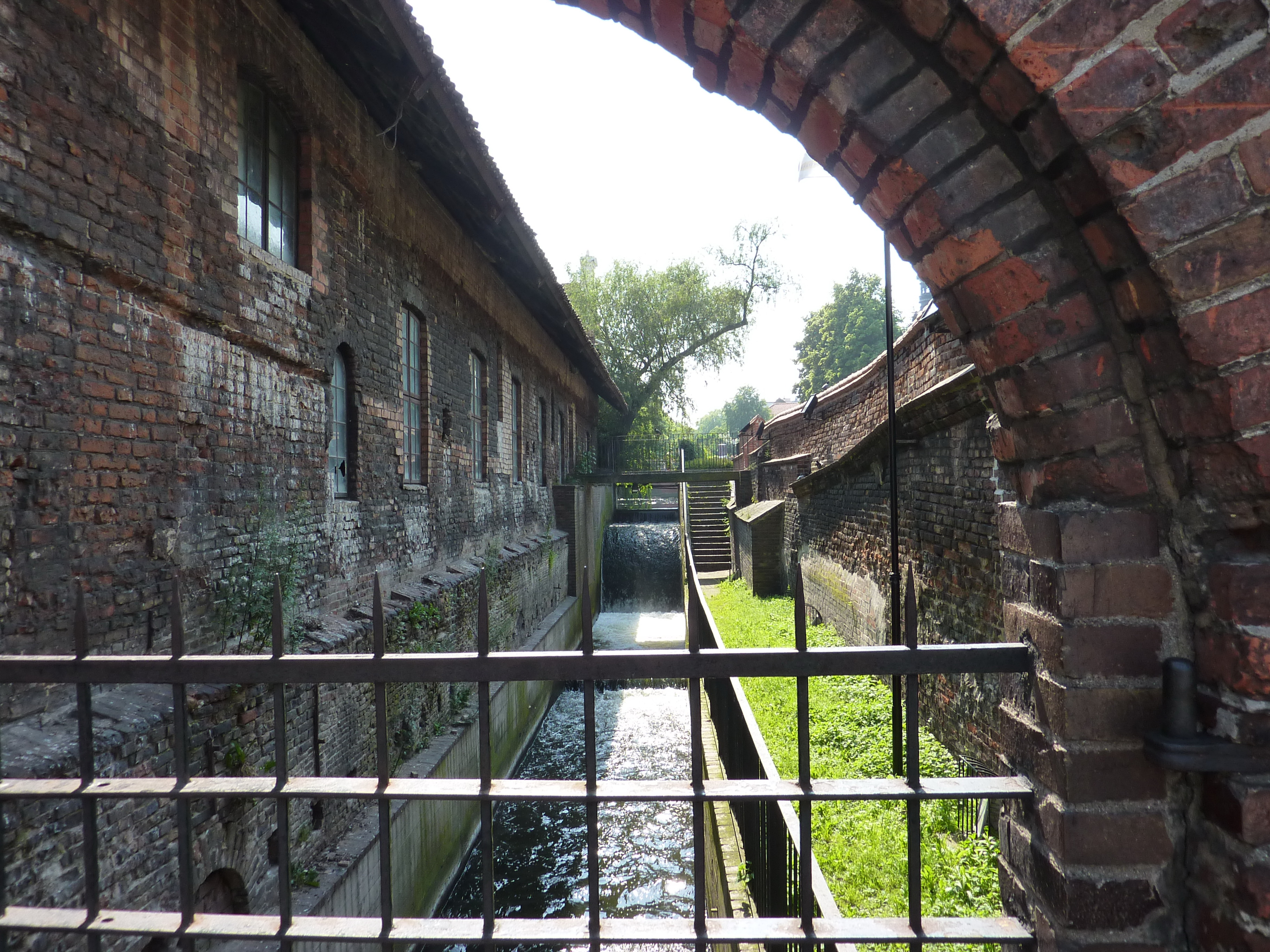
The Radunia Canal flowing around the Great Mill

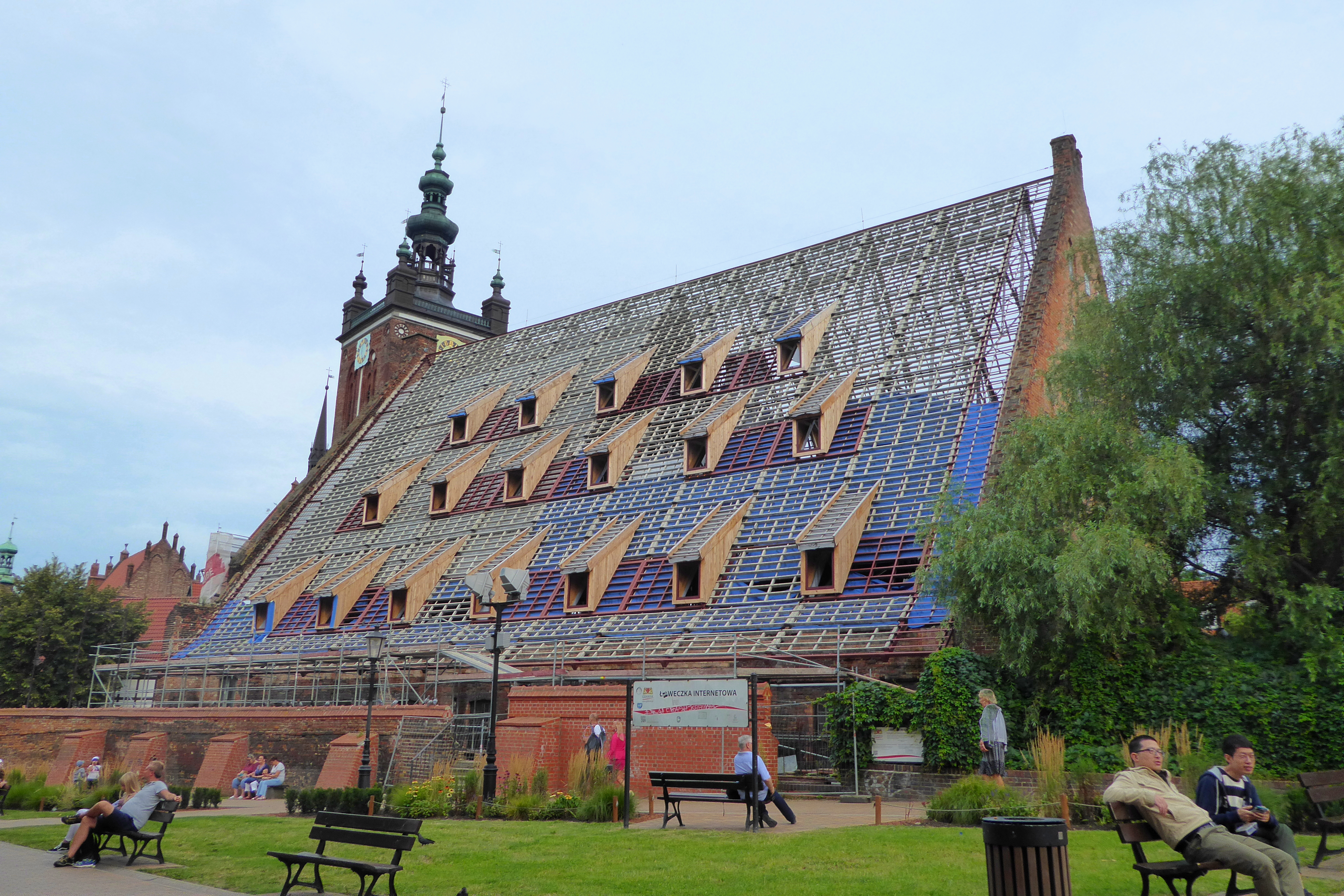
Repairs being carried out, 2019

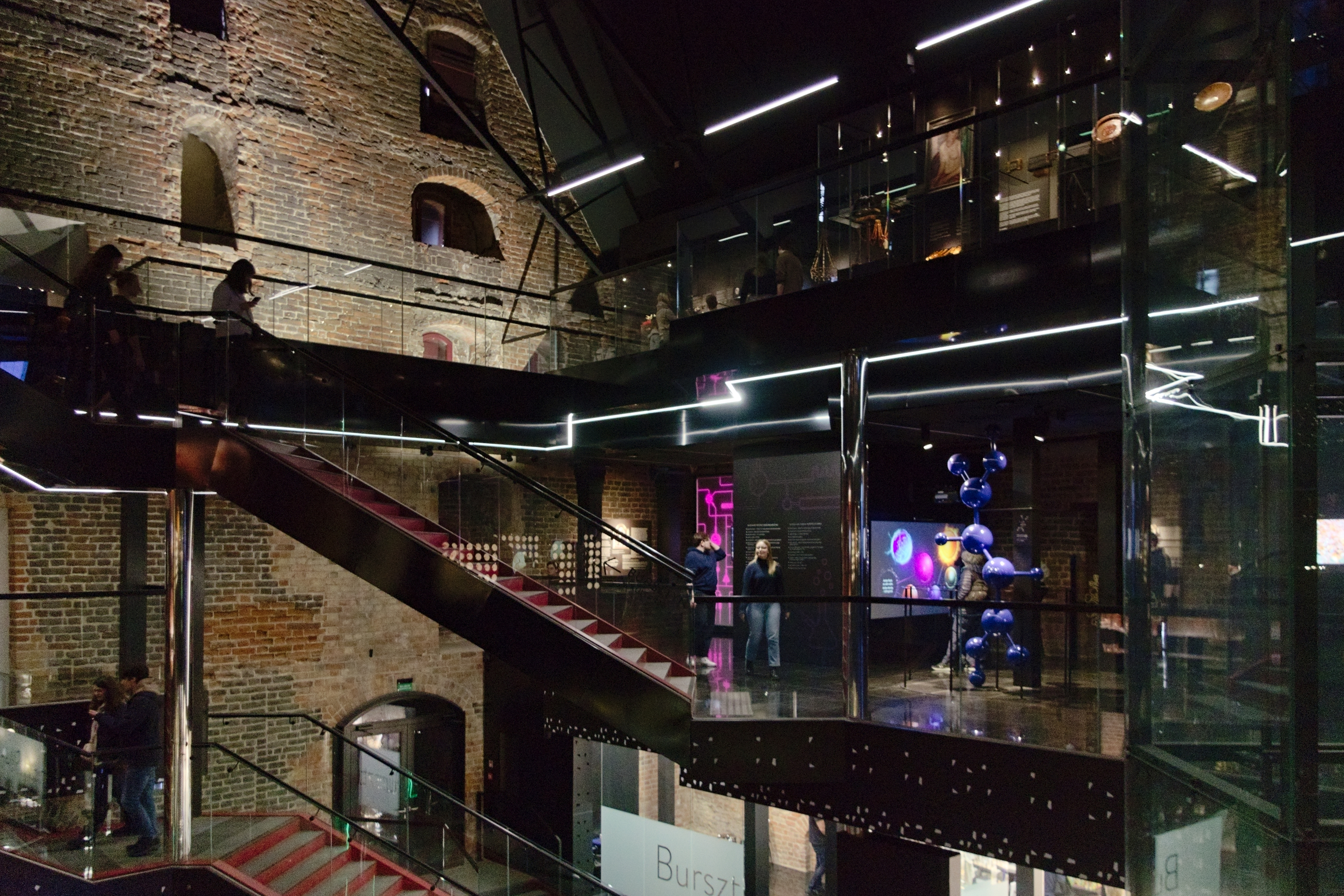
The interior of the Amber Museum

== Bibliography ==
Samp, Jerzy (2000). Miasto czterdziestu bram. Gdańsk: Marpress. ISBN 83-85349-71-5.
