= History of Gdańsk =

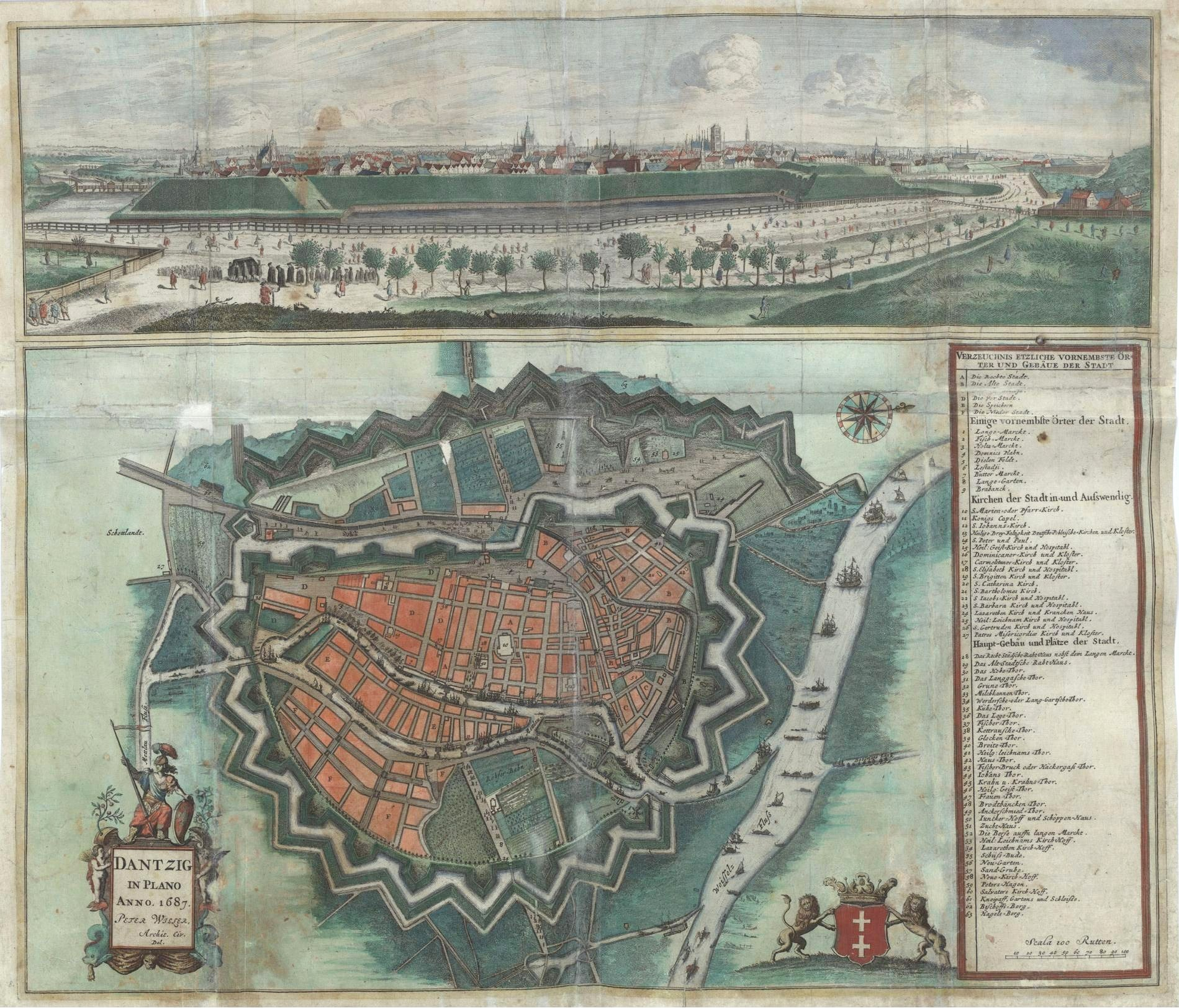
Gdańsk in 1687

Timeline of Gdańsk
Historical affiliations

Duchy of Poland 960s–1025
Kingdom of Poland 1025–1227
Duchy of Pomerelia 1227–1282
Kingdom of Poland 1282–1308
Teutonic Order 1308–1410
Kingdom of Poland 1410–1411
Teutonic Order 1411–1454
Kingdom of Poland 1454–1569
Polish–Lithuanian Commonwealth 1569–1793
Kingdom of Prussia 1793–1807
Free City of Danzig 1807–1814
Kingdom of Prussia 1814–1918
North German Confederation 1867–1871
German Empire 1871–1918
Weimar Germany 1918–1920
Free City of Danzig 1920–1939
Nazi Germany 1939–1945
People's Republic of Poland 1945–1989
Republic of Poland 1989–present

Gdańsk (German: Danzig; Kashubian: Gduńsk) is one of the oldest cities in Poland. Its history begins with an early medieval settlement at the mouth of the Vistula River. A fortified center had been established by the late 10th century, possibly during the expansion of the Piast state under Mieszko I. The city remained part of the Piast state, either directly or as a fief, until the early 13th century, when it came under the rule of the Samborides, who governed Pomerelia as autonomous dukes from 1227.

In 1308 the city became part of the Monastic State of the Teutonic Knights until 1454. Thereafter it became part of Poland again, although with increasing autonomy. A vital naval city for Polish grain trade, it attracted people from all over the European continent. After a period of decline, the city was taken over by Prussia during the Second Partition of Poland in 1793 and subsequently regained its importance as a trading port. Briefly becoming a free city during the Napoleonic Wars, it became again part of the Prussian kingdom after Napoleon's defeat, and from 1871 it formed part of the newly created German Empire. After World War I, the Free City of Danzig was created, a city-state under the supervision of the League of Nations. The German attack on the Polish military depot at Westerplatte marked the start of World War II and the city was annexed by Nazi Germany in 1939.

After World War II, the city again became part of Poland, and the city's German inhabitants, who had constituted the majority of the city's mixed population before the war, either fled or were expelled to Germany. During the post-1945 era, the city was rebuilt from war damage, and vast shipyards were constructed. The city was a centre of Solidarity strikes in the 1980s, and after the abolishment of communism in 1989, its population faced poverty and widespread unemployment with most of the ship building industry closed down.

== History ==
=== Early times ===
The area around the Vistula delta was inhabited by populations belonging to the various archaeological cultures of the Stone Age, Bronze Age, and Iron Age. Settlements existed in the area for several centuries BC.

=== Foundation in early Polish state ===
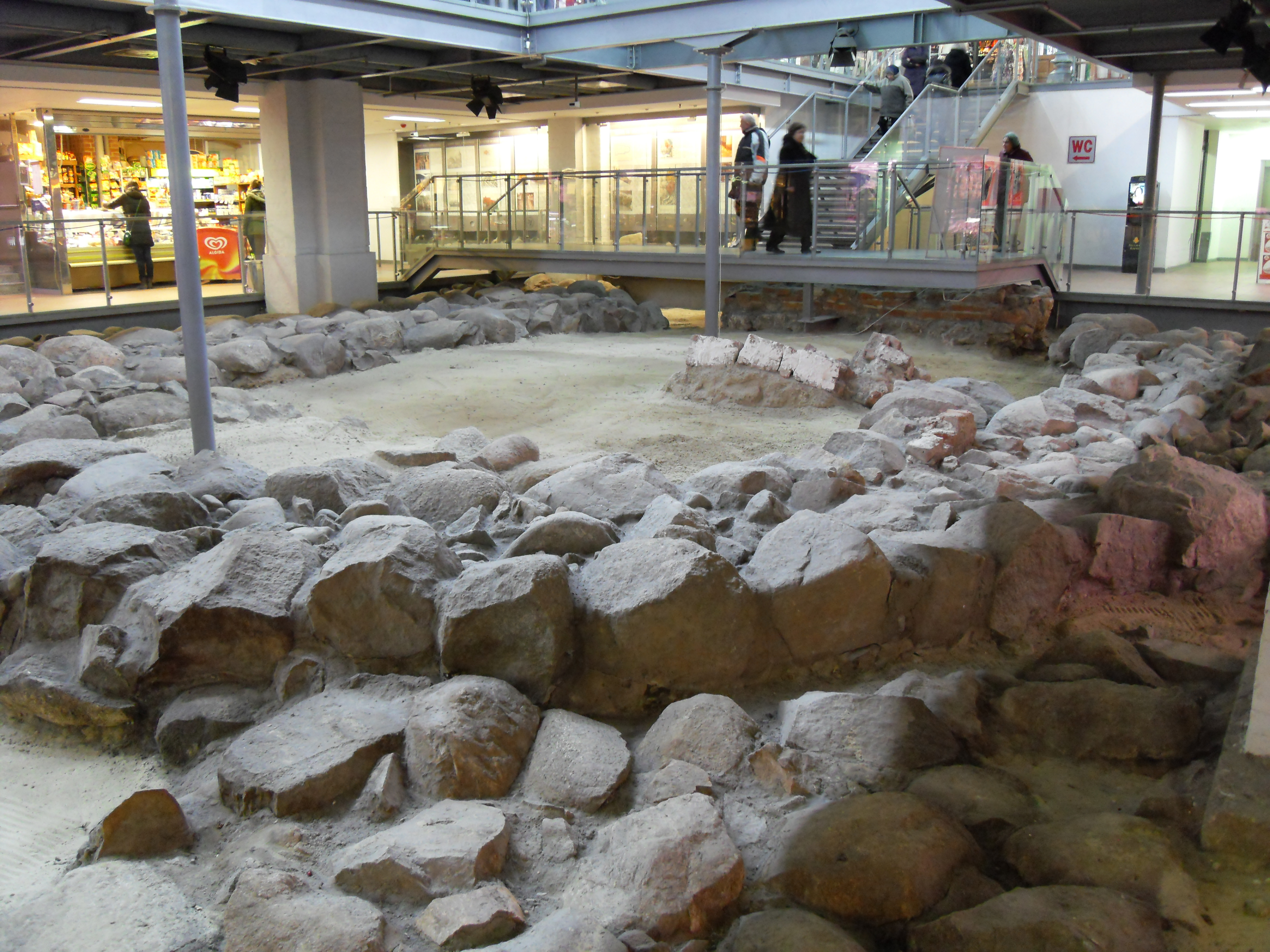
Excavated remains of Gdańsk buildings from the 12th century

Most likely Mieszko I of Poland founded the town in the 980s, thereby connecting the Polish state ruled by the Piast dynasty with the trade routes of the Baltic Sea. The earliest traces of medieval settlement were discovered in an area now occupied by the town hall of the Main Town, on top of archaeological remains from the Roman Iron Age. The oldest constructions of this settlement were built, according to dendrochronology, with timber from trees cut in 930. The immediate western vicinity of the town hall has, however, so far not been surveyed, thus it can not be excluded that the settlement extended further to the west. Dendrodates exclusively refer to the 10th century, no constructions from the 11th century were found. The very beginning of Gdańsk is related to the fall of Truso in the second half of the 10th century - the Viking Age Emporium situated on eastern side of the Vistula delta. Only after this town declined, it was eclipsed as a trade centre by nearby Gdańsk.

In the area south of the current St. Nicholas’ Church, settlement started some years later. The oldest constructions there were dated by finds of pottery to either the second half of the 10th century or the turn of the 10th to the 11th century. The first written record thought to refer to Gdańsk is the vita of Saint Adalbert: Written in 999, it describes how in 997 Saint Adalbert of Prague baptized the inhabitants of urbs Gyddannyzc, "situated on the edge of the vast state [Duchy of Poland] and touching the seashore."

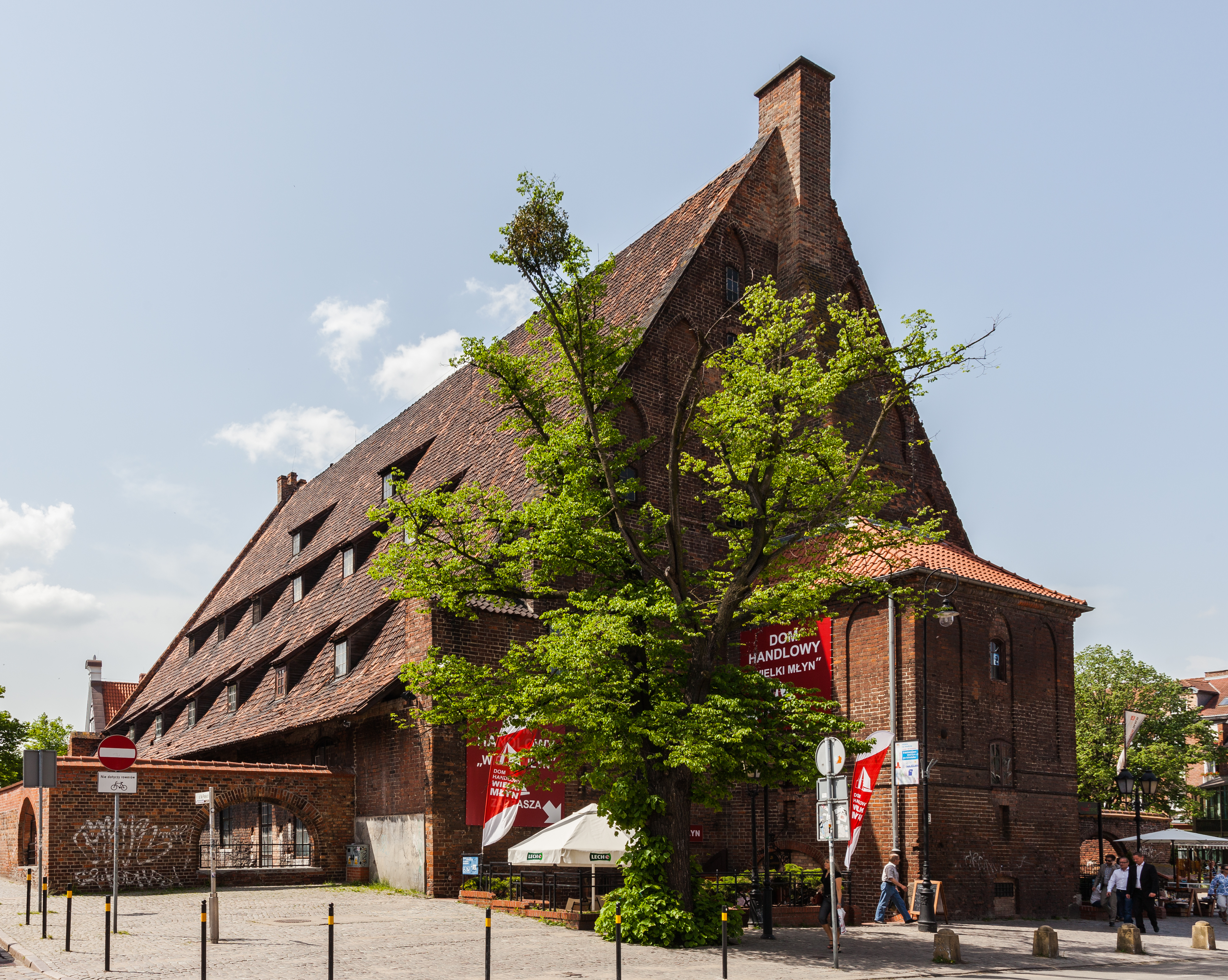
Great Mill of Gdańsk

In the area of the current Great Mill the oldest settlement layers were dated by finds of pottery to the 11th century or the turn of the 12th. Though the area between St. Nicholas’ Church and the Great Mill has not yet been sufficiently surveyed, it has been suggested by Paner that in the course of the 11th century the settlement just south of St. Nicholas’ was expanded to the northwest to reach the vicinity of the Great Mill and, possibly, the area around St. Catherine’s church. In the northern vicinity of St. Nicholas’, in the area of the current market hall, settlement then started probably in the 12th century. As of 2004, archaeologists have not been able to find traces of fortifications around the before mentioned settlement(s).

Slightly east of the Great Mill, at the banks of the Motława river, a stronghold was built in the 1060s. This stronghold encompassed roughly the area now enclosed by the Rycerska and Sukiennicza streets, and in the 11th century was located at the confluence of the Motława and Vistula rivers. The stronghold consisted of a fort and a suburbium covering 2.7 ha which may have held 2,200 to 2,500 inhabitants. Timber from trees cut between 1054 and 1063 was used for buildings of the first phase of the stronghold's construction, timber from trees cut around 1090 was used to construct the buildings of the subsequent phase. A first rampart enclosing the stronghold was built with timber from trees cut in the 1060s. Starting in 1112, according to dendrodates, the stronghold was first leveled and subsequently transformed. This corresponds with written sources mentioning the subduction of Pomerelia by Piast Polish king Boleslaw III Wrymouth between 1112 and 1116. The youngest examined layers from which dendrodates could be derived point at around 1135.

Starting in the mid-12th and throughout the 13th centuries, the settlement west of the stronghold greatly expanded northwards to comprise the wider area around present-day Rajska and Podbielanska streets in the Old Town. In the southern part of the settlement, in the area now occupied by the market hall, a Romanesque St. Nicholas church was built in the second half of the 12th century, which according to Paner "was probably the second masonry church in Gdansk, after the stronghold's church" and was replaced by another Romanesque St. Nicholas church built in 1223-1241 by the Dominicans, who owned the area since 1227. In 1168, the Cistercians built a monastery in nearby Oliwa (northwest of the town) which is inside the modern city limits. A parochial St. Catherine church is first mentioned in written records in the second half of the 13th century, situated in the new centre of the expanded settlement.

Historical population
Year	Population
c. 1000	1000
1235	2,000
1600	40,000
1650	70,000
1700	50,000
1750	46,000
1793	36,000
1800	48,000
1825	61,900
1840	65,000
1852	67,000
1874	90,500
1880	13,701
1885	108,500
1900	140,600
1910	170,300
1925	210,300
1939	250,000
1946	118,000
1960	286,900
1970	365,600
1975	421,000
1980	456,700
1994	464,000
2002	460,000
2019	470,904

=== Capital of a Pomerelian Duchy (1215–1271) ===
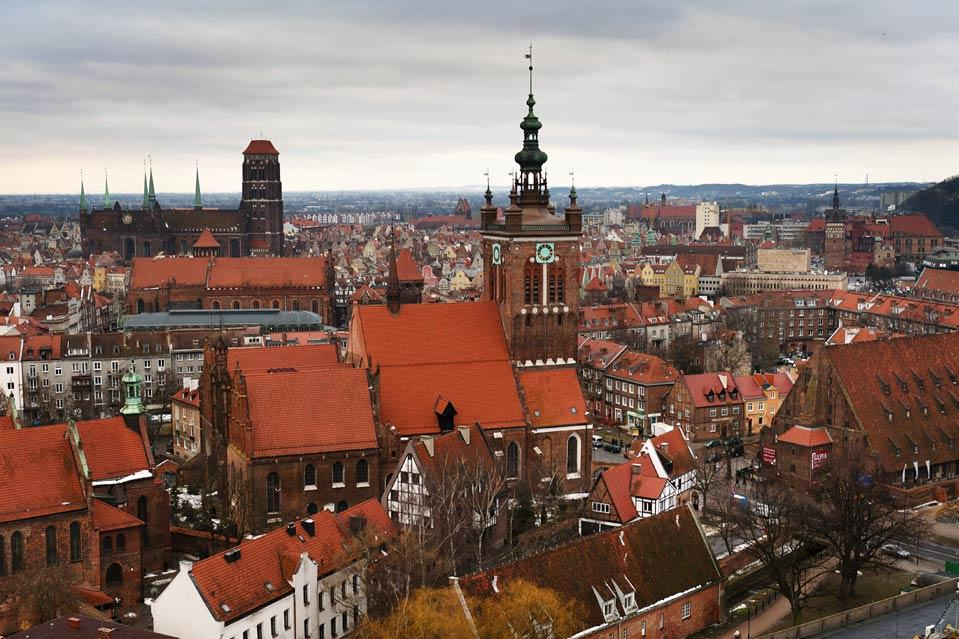
St. Catherine's Church, completed in 1239

At the end of the 11th century Poland lost control over Pomerelia and did not regain it until the 12th century. Soon after Poland itself was divided into several autonomous provinces formally under the overlordship of the High-Duke of Kraków. The Pomerelian duchies remained under the control of stewards, of the Samborides dynasty, appointed by Polish Dukes, usually those of Greater Poland, although like other Polish provinces during the period of the fragmentation of Poland it increased its regional autonomy. Gdańsk was the main stronghold of Samborides, serving as residence of Mestwin I (1207–1220), Swietopelk II (1215–1266) and Mestwin II (1271–1294).

In 1226, the monastery in Oliwa was raided by pagan Old Prussians.

Around 1224 the settlement had some 2,000 inhabitants and was granted Lübeck city rights by Swietopelk II, after merchants from the Hanseatic cities of Lübeck and Bremen had begun to settle there. It rose to become one of the more important trading and fishing ports along the Baltic Sea coast. However, in 1282/1294 Mestwin II, the last duke of Pomerelia, ceded all his lands including Gdańsk to Przemysł II, Duke of Greater Poland, who soon became King of Poland, thus it was reunited with the Kingdom of Poland.

=== Monastic State of the Teutonic Knights (1308–1454) ===
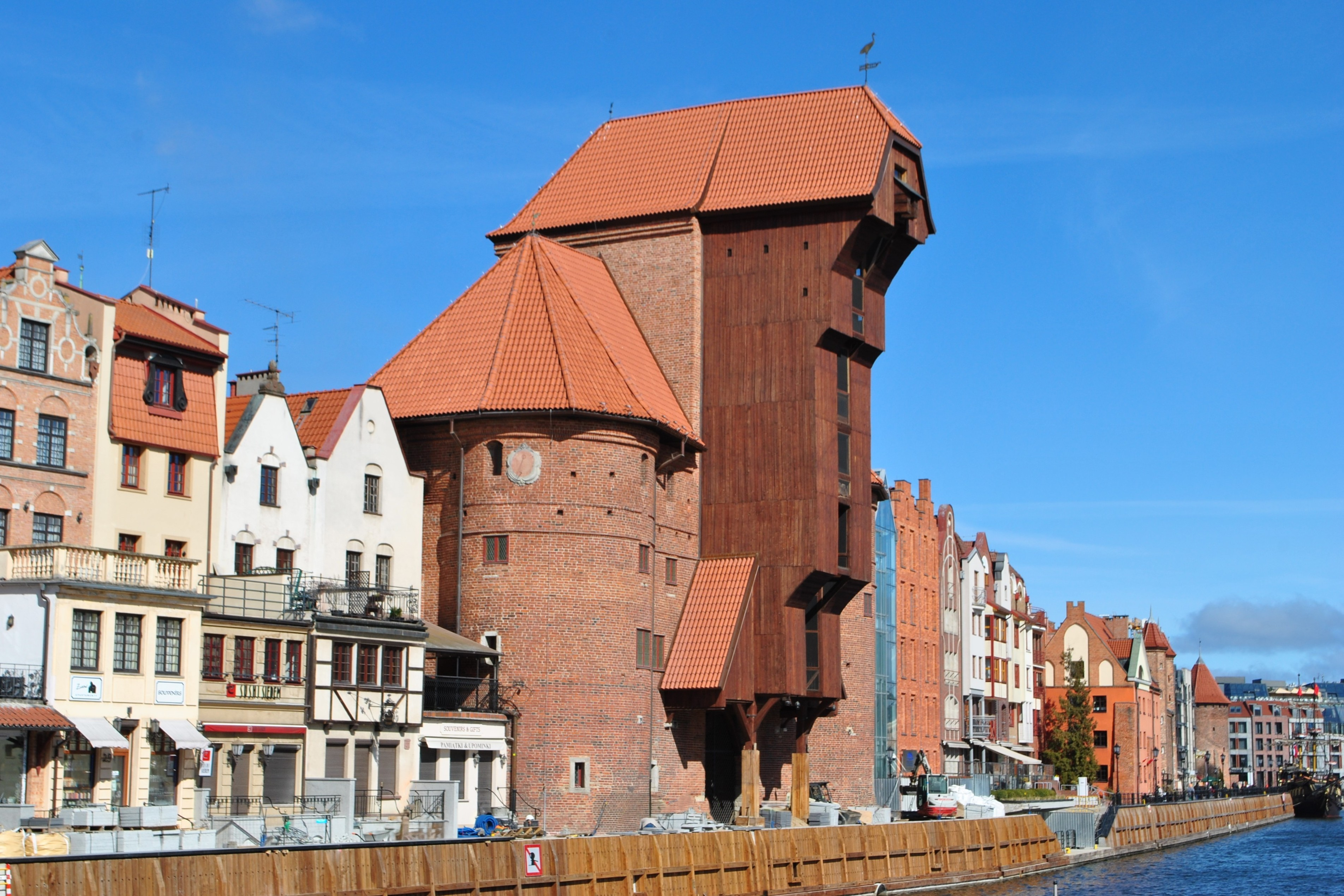
Gdańsk Crane, the largest medieval port crane, was completed in 1444.

At the beginning of the 14th century, the region was plunged into war involving Poland and the Margraviate of Brandenburg. Because King Władysław I of Poland's troops were unable to relieve Gdańsk from a siege by Brandenburg, the city's Pomeranian judge, Bogusza, appealed to the Teutonic Knights for assistance. Subsequently, the Teutonic Order massacred not only the Brandenburg forces and the Pomeranian knights who supported them, but also the town's inhabitants. The royal garrison was attacked and expelled and the suburban populace was slaughtered, with the suburbs subsequently destroyed. Gdańsk's colony of German merchants and artisans was specifically attacked because they competed with the Knights' town of Elbing (Elbląg), a nearby city. Śliwiński & Możejko (2017) give the estimated number of victims as approximately 1,000. According to Smoliński (2021), the death toll is estimated to lie between 60 and 150.

The Teutonic Knights incorporated the town into their monastic state and instructed the remaining burghers to depart. In 1308, they founded Osiek Hakelwerk near the town, initially as a Lechitic fishing settlement.

The Knights then captured the rest of Pomerelia from Brandenburg's troops. In September 1309, Margrave Waldemar of Brandenburg-Stendal sold his claim to the territory to the Teutonic Order for 10,000 marks, thereby connecting the Order's territory with that of the Holy Roman Empire.

The Order did not rebuild the town until the mid-1320s, when some of its former inhabitants—primarily Lübeckers, who also brought back the pre-1308 town seal—returned, alongside settlers from other German regions. The town saw a rapid rise in population and became almost completely German; it would become primarily known by its German name, Danzig. In 1340, the Teutonic Order constructed a large fortress, the Gdańsk Castle, which became the seat of the knights' Komtur.

The takeover of Gdańsk by the Teutonic Order was questioned consistently by the Polish kings Władysław and Casimir III the Great, which led to a series of bloody wars and legal suits in the papal court in 1320 and 1333. After a series of Polish–Teutonic Wars, King Casimir of Poland recognized the Teutonic Order’s possession of Danzig and Pomerelia in the Treaty of Kalisz (1343), Although the Polish kings were able to retain the title "Duke of Pomerania" and were recognized as titular overlords of the crusaders, the Knights retained control of Danzig for the time being.

In 1346, Teutonic Order changed the Town Law of the city, which then consisted only of the Rechtstadt, to Kulm law. In 1358, Danzig joined the Hanseatic League, and became an active member in 1361. It maintained relations with the trade centres Bruges, Novgorod, Lisbon, and Seville. Around 1377, the Old Town was equipped with city rights as well. In 1380, the New Town was founded as the third, independent settlement. Urban growth was mainly driven by migration from German-speaking lands.

In 1380, the first Scots settled in the city, founding what would eventually become a significant Scottish diaspora in Poland.

In 1410, during the Polish–Lithuanian–Teutonic War the city's council recognized the Polish king, Władysław Jagiełło as its sovereign. After the end of the war, concluded with the Peace of Toruń in 1411, Jagiełło relieved the city of its oath of fealty and it reverted to Teutonic rule. Subsequently, the city's populace was repressed by the Teutonic Knights as punishment for its support of the Polish king.

In 1440, the city participated in the foundation of the Prussian Confederation, an organisation opposed to the rule of the Teutonic Order. Following a fire in 1442, the Crane Gate, one of the city's present-day landmarks, was constructed in 1444 under the sanction of the Order.

=== As part of the Kingdom of Poland (1454–1793) ===
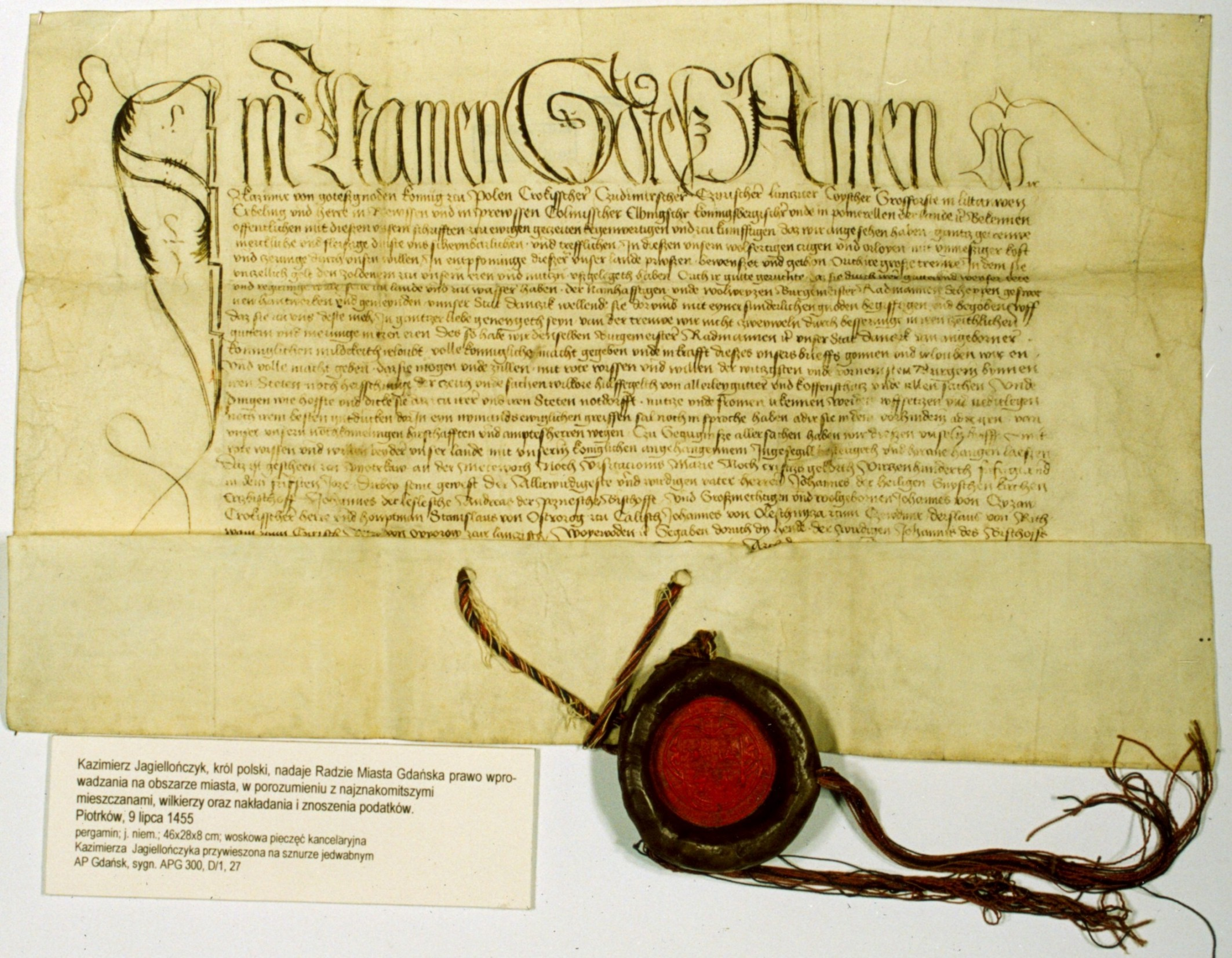
Royal privilege of Casimir IV Jagiellon concerning taxes (1455)

In 1440, the city participated in the foundation of the Prussian Confederation which was an organisation opposed to the rule of the Teutonic Knights. The organisation in its complaint of 1453 mentioned repeated cases in which the Teutonic Knights imprisoned or murdered local patricians and mayors without a court verdict. On the request of the organisation King Casimir IV Jagiellon reincorporated the territory to the Kingdom of Poland in 1454. Since 1454, the city was authorized by the King to mint Polish coins. The local mayor pledged allegiance to the King during the incorporation on 6 March 1454, in Kraków, and the city again solemnly pledged allegiance to the King in June 1454 in Elbing (Elbląg), recognizing the prior Teutonic annexation and rule as unlawful. In 1457, King Casimir IV vested the city was new privileges. During the resulting Thirteen Years' War (1454–1466), the fleet of Danzig fought on the side of Poland in several battles, scoring important victories in the Battle of Bornholm (1457) and the Battle of Vistula Lagoon (1463). The war ended in 1466 with the Order's defeat. With the Second Peace of Thorn (1466), the Teutonic Knights renounced claims to the city and recognized it as part of Poland, within which it was administratively located in the Pomeranian Voivodeship in the province of Royal Prussia (later also part of the Greater Poland Province). The incorporation considerably strengthened Danzig’s position, as the king granted the city extensive privileges on 16 June 1454. In 1455, the king conferred additional rights on the city, including the right to enact its own laws and to impose taxes.

On 15 May 1457, King Casimir IV granted the town the Great Privilege, after he had been invited by the town's council and had already stayed in town for five weeks. With the Great Privilege, the town was granted full autonomy and protection by the king of Poland. The privilege removed tariffs and taxes on trade within Poland, Lithuania, and Ruthenia (present day Belarus and Ukraine), and conferred on the town independent jurisdiction, legislation and administration of its territory, as well as the right to mint its own coin, the Danzig thaler. Furthermore, the privilege united the Old Town and Main Town and legalised the demolition of New Town, which had sided with the Teutonic Order. By 1457, New Town was demolished completely and no buildings remained.

The 15th and 16th centuries brought changes to the city's cultural heritage. They could be seen in the arts and language, as well as Danzig's contributions to the world of science. In 1471, a refurbished sailing ship under the native Danzig captain Paul Beneke brought the famous altar painting titled The Last Judgment by artist Hans Memling to the city. Around 1480–1490, tablets were installed at St. Mary's Church, depicting the Ten Commandments in Middle Low German.

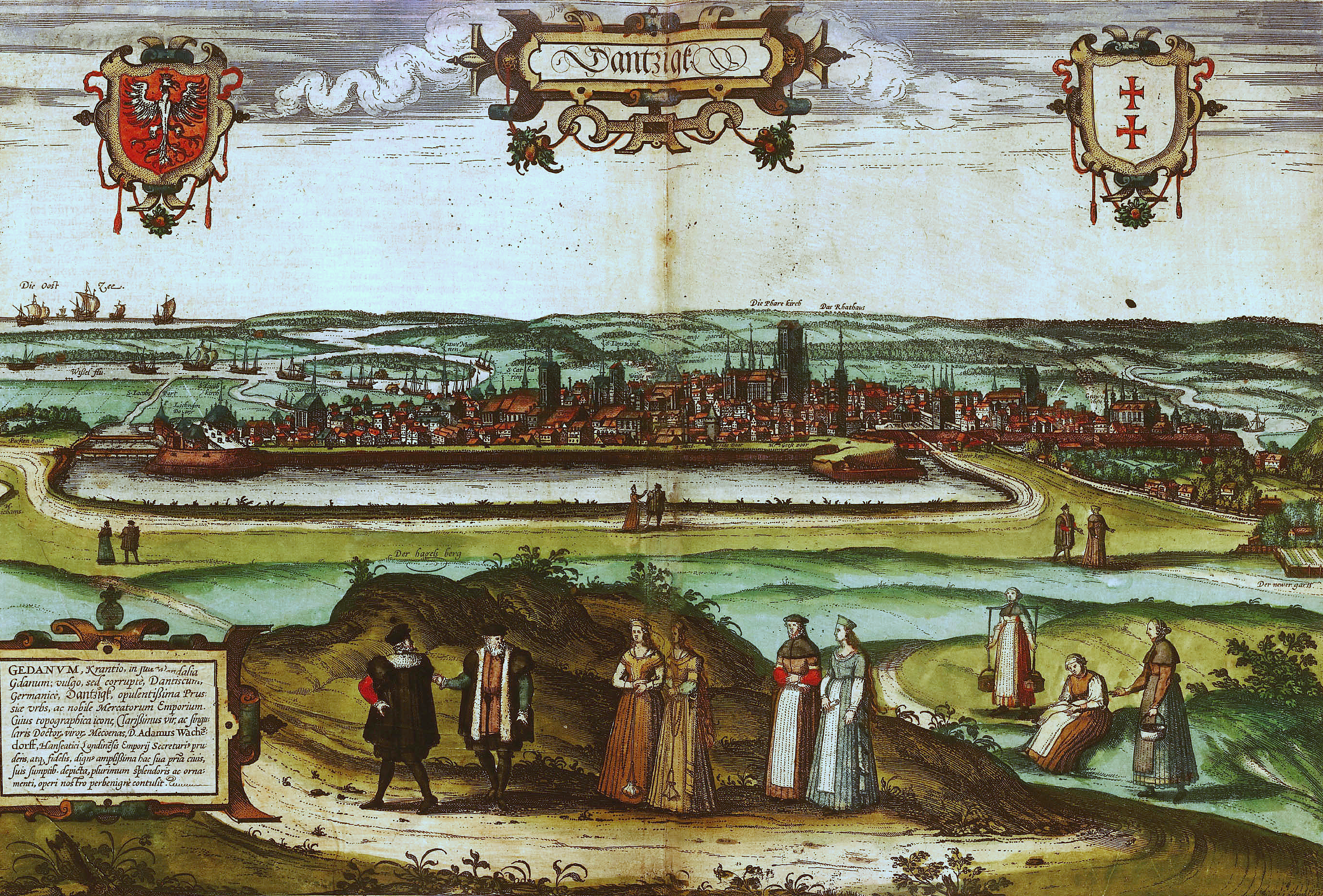
Danzig in the 16th century, published by Georg Braun and Frans Hogenberg.

The city was visited by Nicolaus Copernicus in 1504 and 1526, and Narratio Prima, the first printed publication of his heliocentric theory, was published there in 1540.

In 1520 Lutheran scriptures were printed, in 1522 the first Lutheran liturgy was held by the local cleric Jakob Hegge and the Protestant Reformation was soon supported by the local populace. In 1523 some iconoclastic riots occurred and the towncouncil was deposed. This revolt was quelled in 1524 by Polish troops and the leaders were executed or imprisoned, some of them released and exiled to the Protestant Duchy of Prussia, a vassal duchy of Poland, on request of Albert of Prussia. While the city ordinance of 1526 penalized the Lutheran liturgy under death penalty, the burghers were still influenced by reformatory ideas. In 1557 the Lutheran Eucharist was permitted and both religious orientations were tolerated.

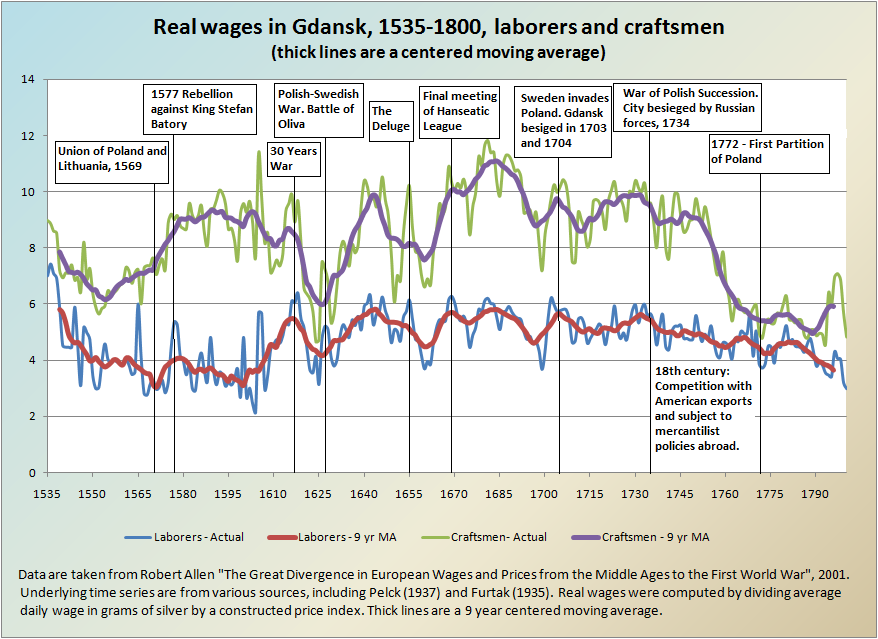
Real wages for laborers and craftsmen, 1535–1800. Click to enlarge.

Georg Joachim Rheticus visited the mayor of Danzig in 1539, while he was working with Nicolaus Copernicus in nearby Frombork. The mayor of Danzig gave Rheticus financial assistance for the publication of the Narratio Prima, published by the Danzig printer Franz Rhode in 1540 and to this day considered the best introduction to the Copernican theory. While in Danzig, Rheticus, who was also a cartographer and navigational instrument maker, interviewed Danzig sailors as to their navigational needs. He presented the Tabula chorographica auff Preusse to Duke Albert of Prussia in 1541.

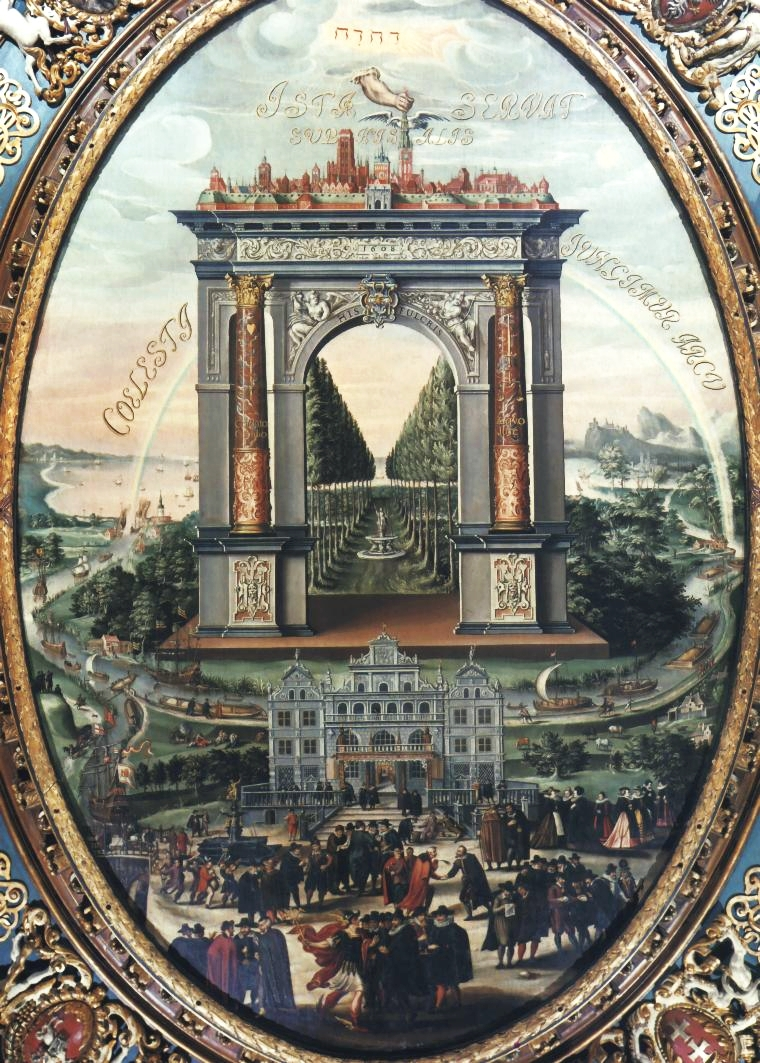
Apotheosis of Gdansk by Izaak van den Blocke. Vistula trade of marchandises from the Polish–Lithuanian Commonwealth was the main source of the city's prosperity in the Golden Age.

In 1566, the official language of the city's governing institutions was changed from Middle Low German, which had been used throughout the Hanseatic cities, to standard German, used in most German courts. The Polish language was taught in local Academic Gymnasium (Grammar School or High School) from 1589.

Danzig opposed the Union of Lublin of 1569, viewing it as a violation of its constitutional rights. German historians have portrayed this resistance as a national conflict in which the large cities of Danzig, Elbing and Thorn in the struggle against the suppression of their German nationality. Despite the Lublin Union, which reduced Royal Prussia's autonomy, Danzig succeeded in maintaining its status as an autonomous city state under the Polish Crown.

In the 16th century, Danzig was the largest and one of the most influential cities of Poland and had a preponderantly German-speaking population. The city enjoyed voting rights during the free election period. The city flourished and several of its landmarks were erected in the 16th and 17th centuries, including the Highland Gate, Golden Gate, Neptune's Fountain, Royal Chapel, Great Armoury and Green Gate, an official residence of Polish Kings. The St. Mary's Church and Main Town Hall were completed, with the latter topped with a gilded statue of Polish King Sigismund II Augustus.

From the mid-16th to the late 17th century, Dutch architects held the position of town master builder. Among them was Reinier von Amsterdam, who oversaw the construction of the Green Gate. The architecture of Danzig was influenced by Dutch cities, with whole streets designed in the Renaissance style characteristic of the Netherlands.

During the Danzig rebellion the city was besieged for six months in 1577 by the forces of King Stephen Báthory. With the Royal army unable to capture the city and the Danzig forces failing to lift the siege a settlement was negotiated in which Báthory confirmed the city's special status and her Danzig law privileges and the city recognised him as ruler of the Commonwealth and paid him a large sum of 200,000 złotys.

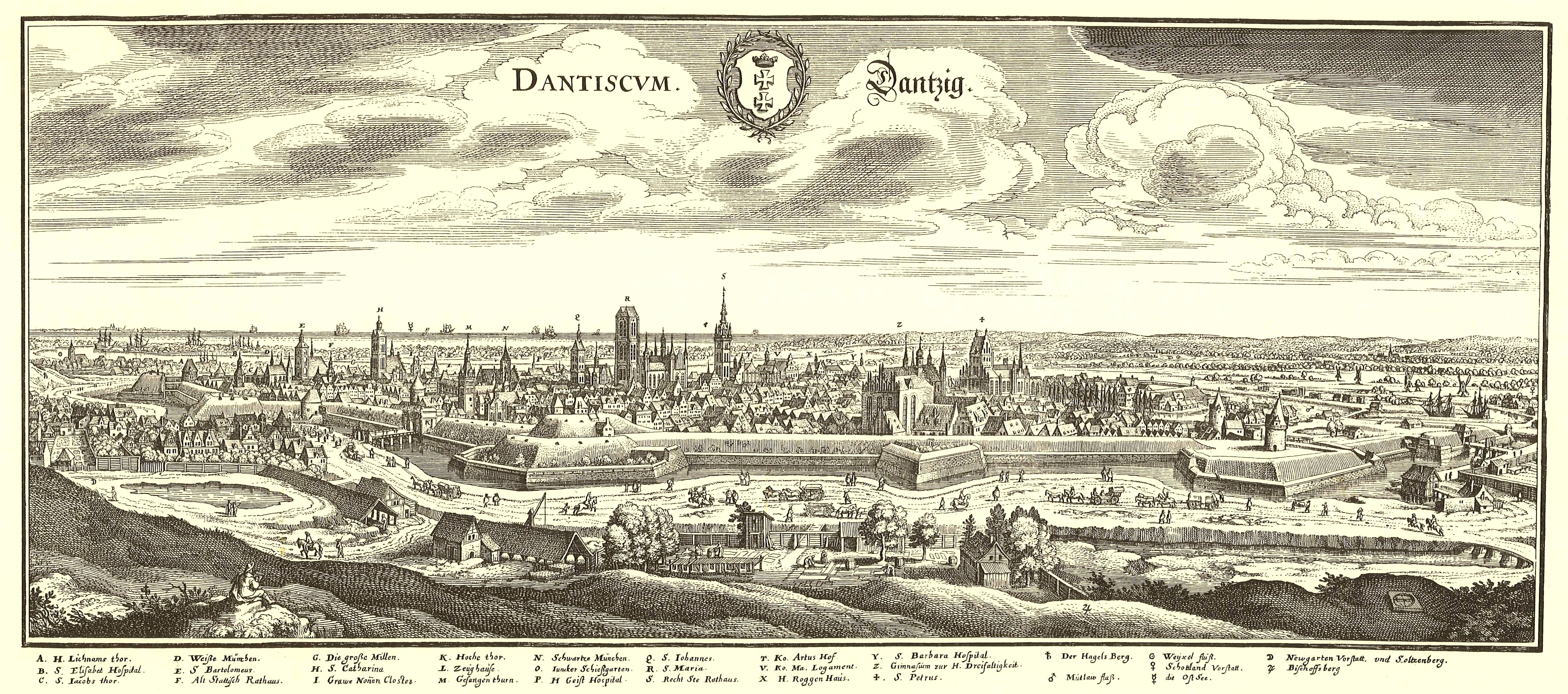
Danzig in the 17th century, engraving by Matthäus Merian

In 1606 a distillery named Der Lachs (German for "the Salmon") was founded, which produced one of Danzig's most famous products, a liqueur named Danziger Goldwasser.

The Danzig printer Andreas Hünefeld (Hunsfeldus) (1606–1652) printed a Danzig edition of the Rosicrucian Manifestos. Later on, he published the poems of Martin Opitz. Opitz had died in 1639 and his friend, Pastor Bartholomaeus Nigrinus of Danzig, together with two associates edited the Opitz poems for the Hünefeld printing house. Polish private schools were opened in addition to public schools who taught Polish during this period with 1370 Polish students in later half of the 17th century.

Around 1640, Johannes Hevelius established his astronomical observatory in the Old Town. Polish King John III Sobieski regularly visited Hevelius numerous times.

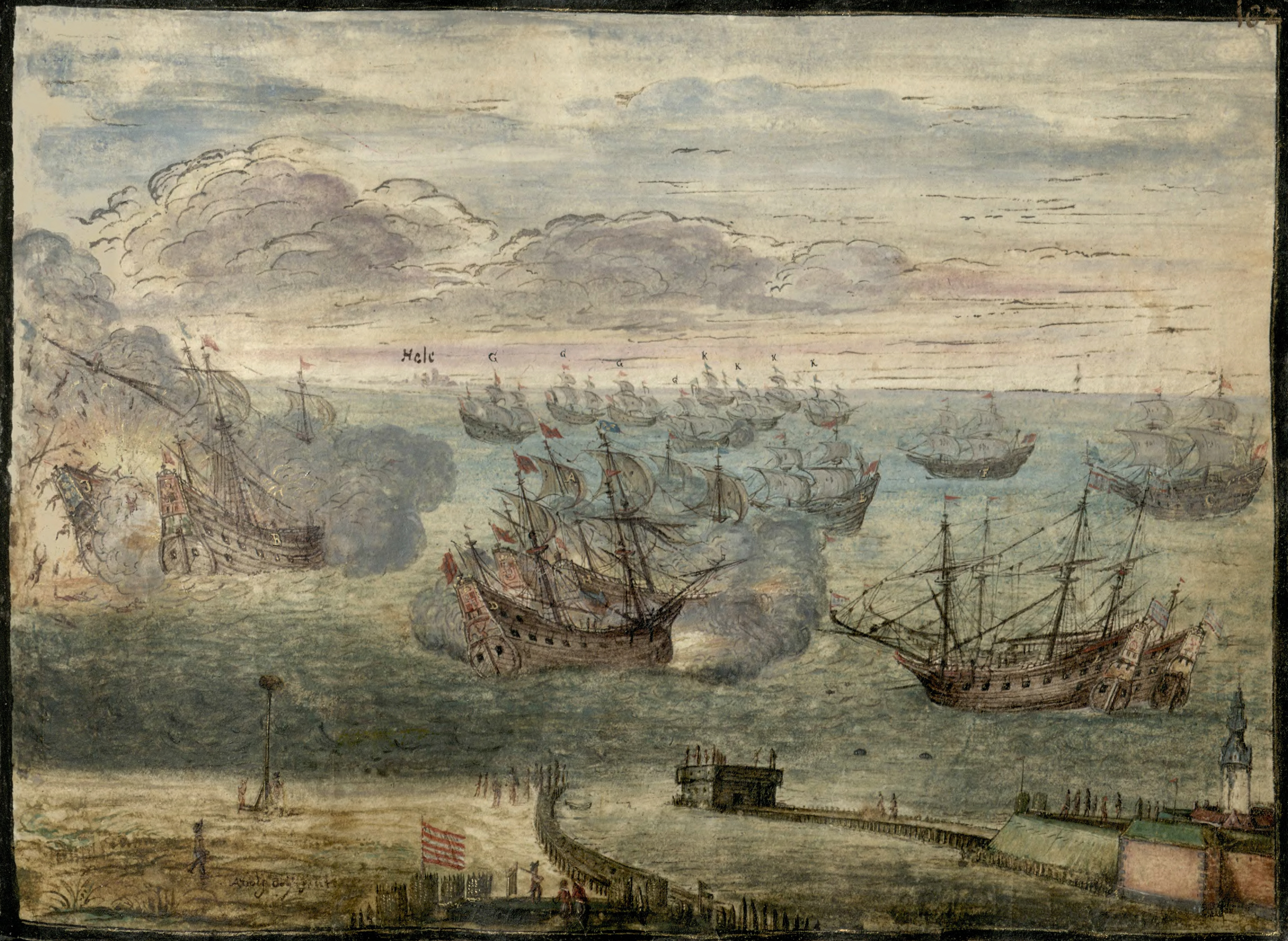
Battle of Oliwa (1627)

From the 14th century until the mid-17th century, Danzig experienced rapid growth, becoming by the 16th century the largest city on the Baltic seaboard, owing to its large trade with the Netherlands and its handling of most of Poland's seaborne trade, transported northward via the Vistula River. The city's prosperity was severely restricted, however, by the Polish–Swedish wars of 1626–1629 and the 1655–1660, and it suffered an epidemic of bubonic plague in 1709. In 1627, the naval Battle of Oliwa was fought near the city, regarded as one of the greatest victories in the history of the Polish Navy. In 1655, Charles X Gustav of Sweden invaded Poland and appeared outside the Danzig city walls, but refrained from laying siege. A Dutch fleet arrived in July 1656, reopening the vital trade with the Netherlands. The war of 1655–1660 ended with the Treaty of Oliwa, signed in the present-day district of Oliwa.

In 1650 87 percent of the populace were Lutheran, 6 percent Calvinists and about 7 percent Catholics, a number that would grow to more than 20 percent in 1800 due to the migration of Catholics from the vicinity. A large share of the Lutheran population used Polish as their language and Poles played an influential role in the Lutheran Church in Royal Prussia. In 1686, a French Huguenot commune was established in the city.

Danzig took part in all Hanseatic League conferences until the final one in 1669. By that time the United Provinces and other long-distance overseas commercial powers had surpassed the Baltic trade centres such as Danzig. In 1677, a Polish-Swedish alliance against Brandenburg was signed in the city.

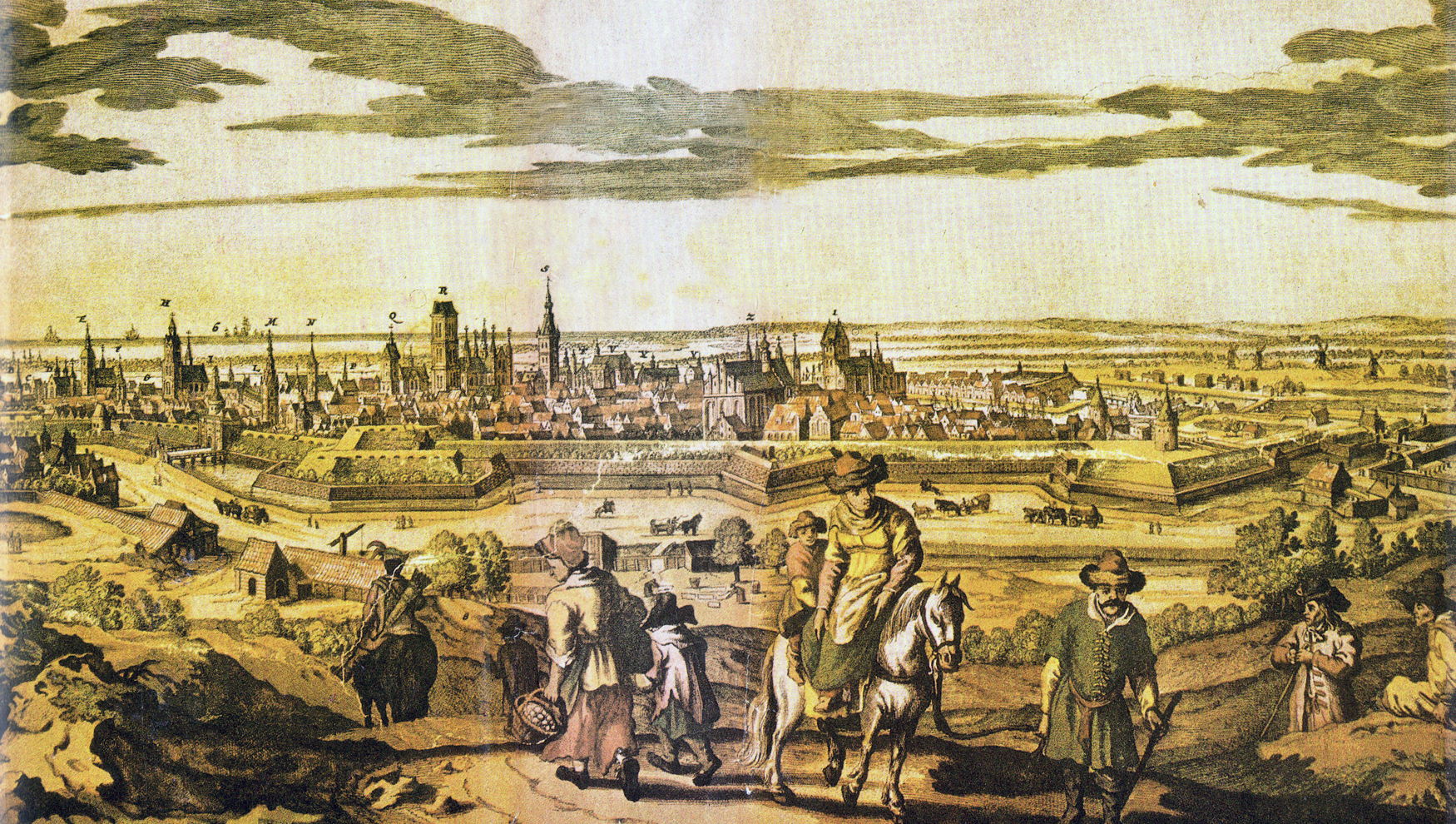
Danzig in the 18th century

After the outbreak of the Rákóczi's War of Independence against Austria, in 1703, Polish King Augustus II the Strong in an official document to the city prohibited the purchase of weapons for the Hungarian insurgents, but at the same time he secretly assured Francis II Rákóczi of his friendship, and many weapons were supplied to the Hungarians through the city during the war. After the fall of the uprising in 1711, Rákóczi and his court, including essayist Kelemen Mikes and painter Ádám Mányoki, found refuge in the city. Rákóczi often met with Polish dignitaries and the envoy of France in the city. In 1712, Rákóczi left the city for France, however, some Hungarians, like court marshall Ádám Vay stayed.

In 1734, the city was briefly occupied by the Russians under Field Marshal Munnich after the prolonged Siege of Danzig during the War of the Polish Succession. The city, which supported Stanisław Leszczyński, the losing candidate for the throne, was forced to pay reparations following the siege.

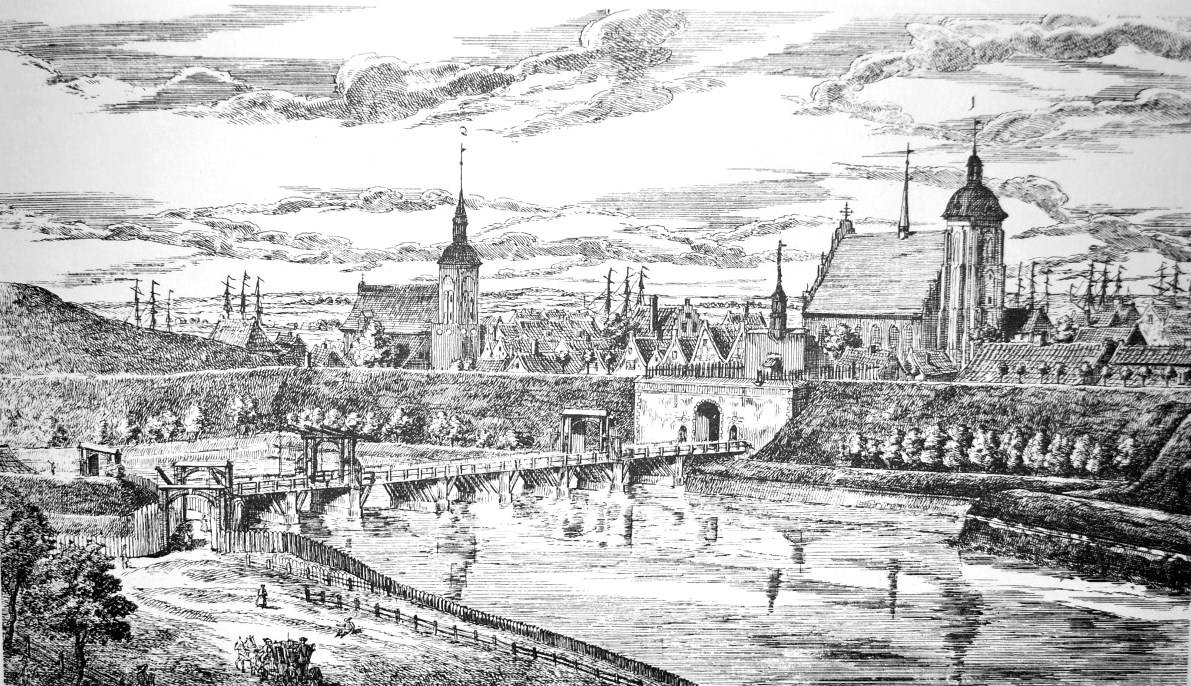
Old Town in the 1770s with the Saint James church on the left and Saint Bartholomew church on the right

In 1743 the Danzig Research Society was formed by Daniel Gralath and Gottfried Lengnich.

In 1772, the First Partition of Poland took place and Prussia annexed almost all of the former Royal Prussia, which became the Province of West Prussia. However, Danzig remained a part of Poland as an exclave separated from the rest of the country. The Prussian king cut off the city with a military controlled barrier, also blocking shipping links to foreign ports, on the pretence that a cattle plague may otherwise break out. Danzig declined in its economic significance and lost commercial shares to Elbing, which had come under Prussian control in 1772. However, by the end of the 18th century, Danzig was still one of the most economically integrated cities in Poland. It was well-connected and traded actively with German cities, while other Polish cities became less well-integrated towards the end of the century, mostly due to greater risks for long-distance trade, given the number of violent conflicts along the trade routes.

=== In the Kingdom of Prussia (1793–1806) ===
Danzig was annexed by the Kingdom of Prussia in 1793 in the Second Partition of Poland. It became part of the province of West Prussia. According to Peter Oliver Loew (2011) the common language in Danzig until the partition was German and the knowledge of German was the premise to become an integrated burgher. The population largely opposed the Prussian annexation and wanted the city to remain part of the Kingdom of Poland. Many demonstrated their resentment towards Prussia, with some, like Arthur Schopenhauer's family, choosing emigration. The mayor of the city stepped down from his office due to the annexation. The notable city councilor Johann Uphagen, historian and art collector, whose Baroque house is now a museum, also resigned as a sign of protest against the annexation. The migration processes that happened after Prussia took over the city diminished the usage of Polish language and structure of population.

Danzig's integration into the Prussian kingdom soon fostered its economic revival. The city regained its significance as a Baltic port, though trade patterns shifted increasingly towards the British market. It also benefited from its integration into the Prussian customs territory, which had been expanded considerably since the Second Partition of Poland, and new postal links to Berlin, Königsberg, and Warsaw, which facilitated communication.

=== Napoleonic Free City (1807–1814) ===
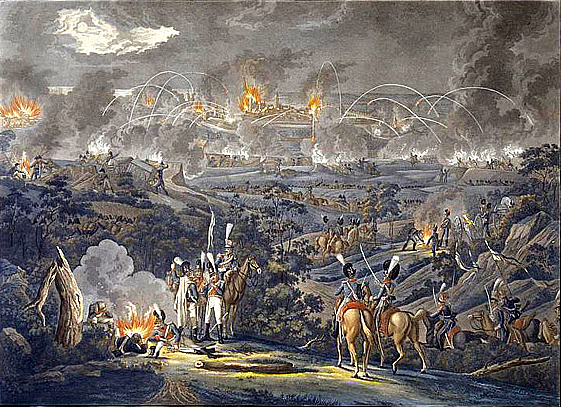
The Siege of Danzig, 1807

After the defeat of the Fourth Coalition, and the capture of the city by French, Polish and Italian troops, Napoleon Bonaparte created the semi-independent Free City of Danzig (1807–1814). Danzig reverted to Prussia after Napoleon's defeat in 1814, following another siege that lasted almost a whole year. The city became the capital of Regierungsbezirk Danzig within West Prussia in 1815.

=== In the Kingdom of Prussia (1815–1919) ===
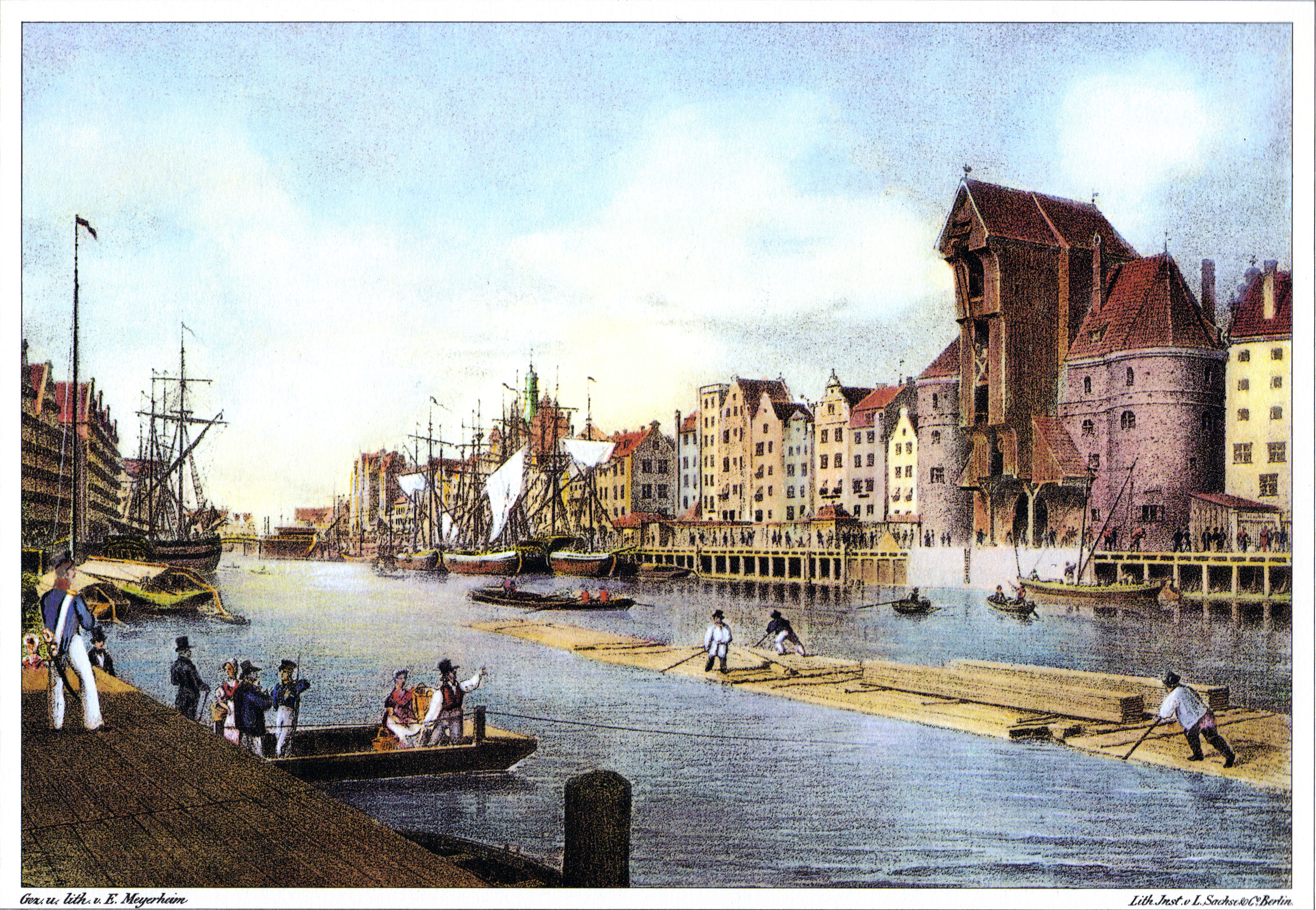
Danzig in 1850, by Friedrich Eduard Meyerheim

In 1816 about 70 percent of the populace were Lutheran, 23.6 percent Catholics; the share of Catholics would grow to 33 percent in 1910.

From the 1820s, the Wisłoujście Fortress served as a prison, mainly for Polish political prisoners, including resistance members, protesters, insurgents of the November and January uprisings and refugees from the Russian Partition of Poland fleeing conscription into the Russian Army. Insurgents of the November Uprising were also imprisoned in Biskupia Górka. In October and November 1831, several Polish cavalry units of the November Uprising stopped near the city on the way to their internment places, and in May–June 1832 and November 1833, more than 1,000 Polish insurgents departed partitioned Poland through the city's port, boarding ships bound for France, the United Kingdom and the Antebellum United States (see Great Emigration).

From 1824 until 1878, East and West Prussia were combined as a single province within the Prussian Kingdom. The city's longest serving mayor was Robert von Blumenthal, who held office from 1841, through the revolutions of 1848, until 1863. As a part of Prussia Danzig was a member of the Zollverein and elected its representatives to the German National Assembly of 1848, but lay outside of the borders of the 1815–1866 German Confederation. The population in 1843 was 62,000 inhabitants. In the second half of the 19th century the growth of the German population in the city was being slowly reversed, with more Poles settling in, mainly from Pomerania, and parts of the local population discovering their Polish roots.

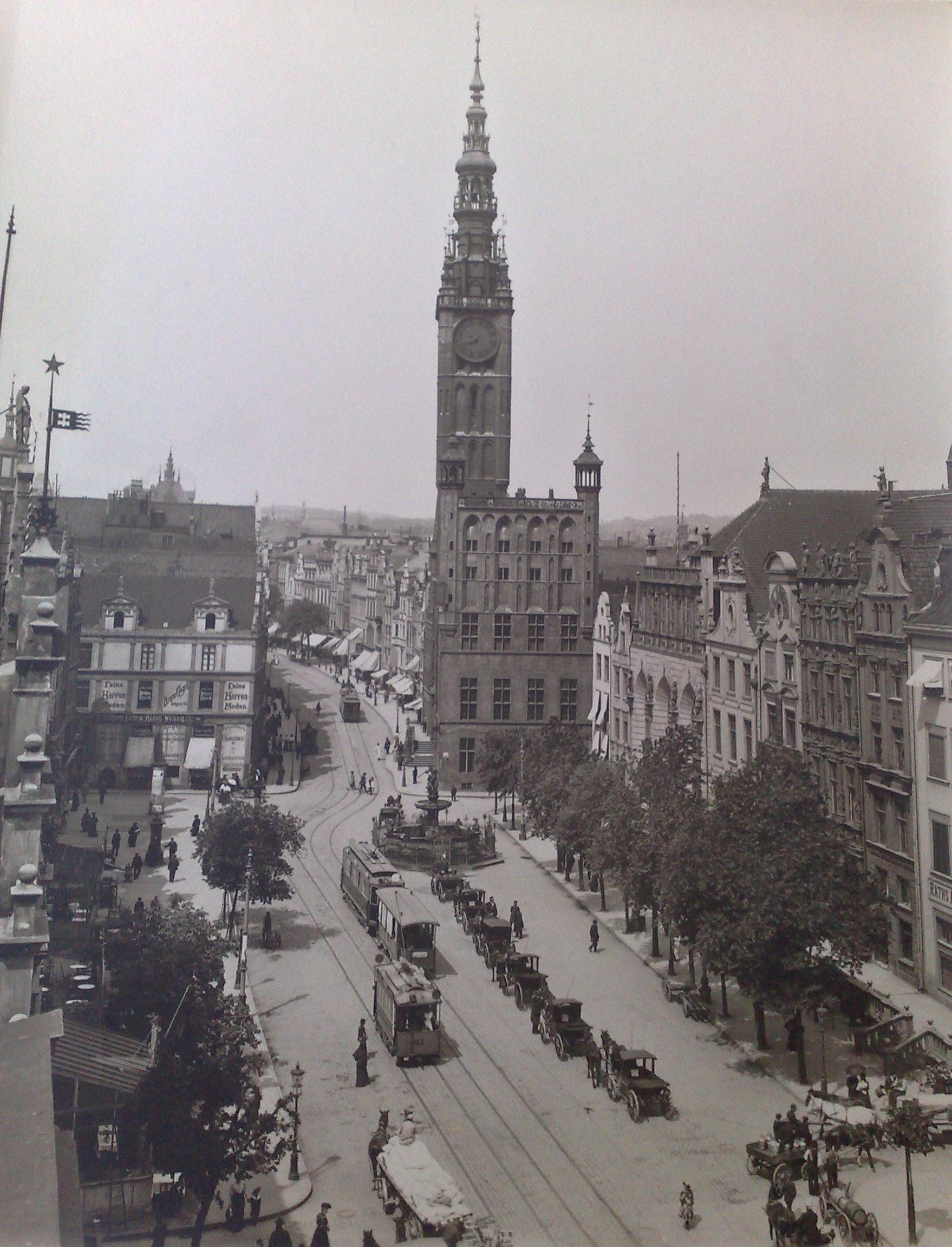
Long Market in 1906

With the Industrial Revolution and the steam engine trains, industrial machinery and Ferdinand Schichau's Schichau-Werke company gained the upper hand for Elbing over Danzig. Schichau later constructed a large shipyard in Danzig as well. In the second half of the 19th century, Danzig experienced railway construction, port expansion, and the growth of industries such as shipbuilding, timber processing, and food production. Nevertheless, its industrial development lagged behind that of other major Prussian cities. In 1871, Danzig became the first city in Continental Europe to establish a sewer system with wastewater treatment, resulting in a significant improvement in public health.

In 1871 the city was included in the newly created German Empire. The Polish minority in the city started its activities in the late 1870s and 1880s with the creation of Polish organisation Ogniwo and formation of Polish bank Bank Bałtycki. In 1891 a Polish newspaper called Gazeta Gdańska was printed, later joined by two publishing houses and a printing press. Local Poles focused their cultural life in the vicinity of Church of Saint Anna.

By 1875 the city's importance in the European wheat trade was evident, and it was second only to Odessa in terms of export volume. Two thirds of the wheat coming into the city was from the Russian Partition of Poland. In 1865, the export value of the wheat for that year was 11,500,000 thalers. The export of other grains was only valued at 3,300,000 thalers.

In 1907 local Poles from the "Straż" movement organised protests against Prussian policies of Germanization, including a ban on Polish language and expropriation of Polish home owners.

=== Free City (1920–1939) ===
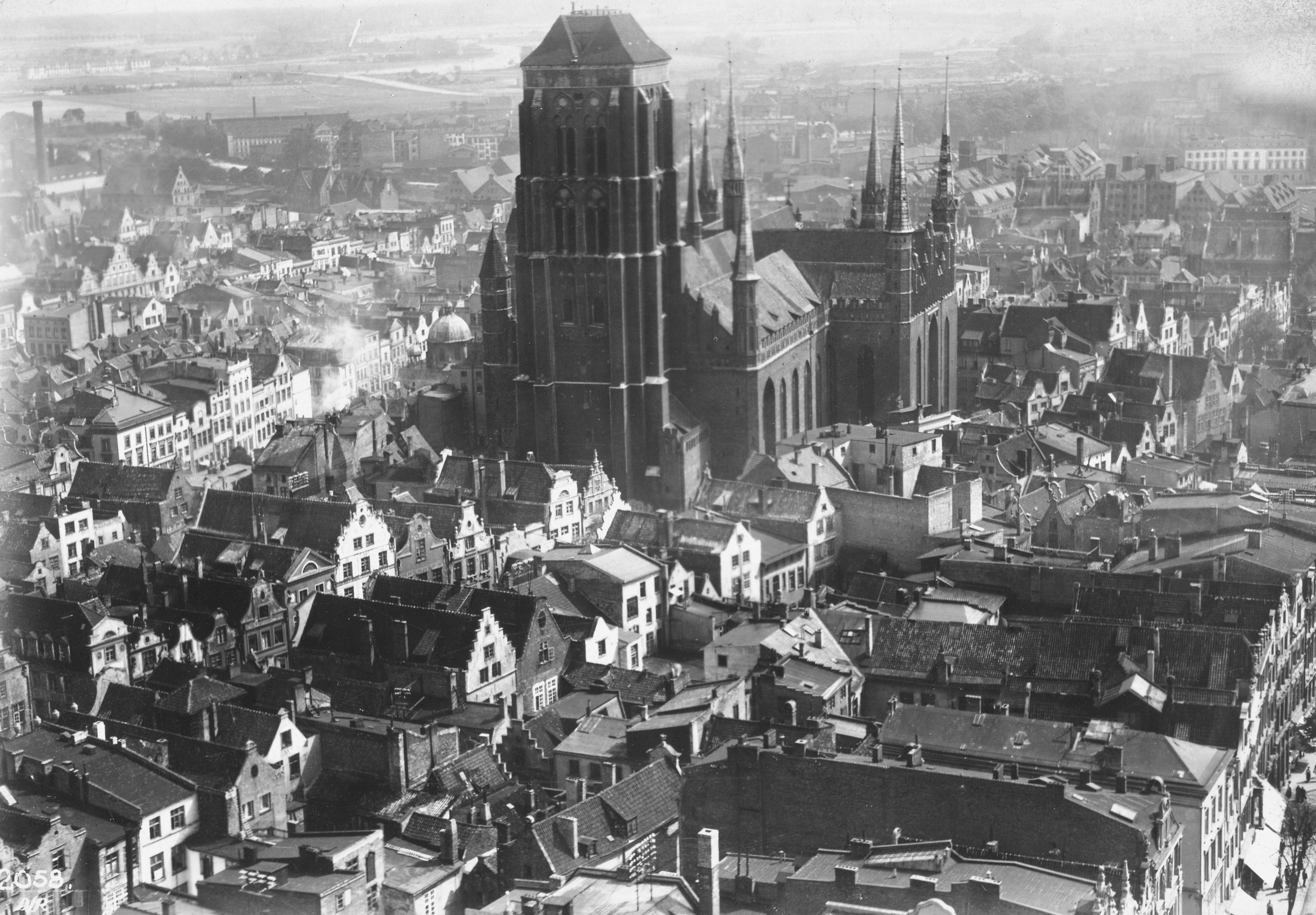
St. Mary's Church circa 1920

Following Germany's defeat in World War I, the Allied powers in the Treaty of Versailles (1919) decided to create the Free City of Danzig (under a commissioner appointed by the League of Nations) covering the city itself, the seaport, and a substantial surrounding territory. The League of Nations rejected the citizens' petition to have their city officially named as the Free Hanseatic city of Danzig (Freie Hansestadt Danzig). The citizens of Danzig received a separate citizenship of the Free City and thus lost their former German citizenship. A customs union with Poland was created by the victorious allies of World War I, and Poland's rights also included free use of the harbour, a Polish post office and a Polish garrison in Westerplatte district. This arrangement was inspired by the history of the city, which for hundreds of years was part of Poland, with which it shared economic interests, thanks to which it flourished, and within which it enjoyed wide autonomy.

According to the official census of 1923 3.7 percent of city population was Polish (13,656 out of 366,730 citizens of the Free City) and in the 1920s and 1930s the city's population was over 90% German. However Polish claims range up to around 22.000, or around 6% of the population, and increased to around 13% in the 1930s. Other estimates give the number of Poles as 17% in the whole area of the Free City In the elections to the Free City of Danzig's Parliament the results of Polish Parties declined from 6.08 percent of votes in 1919 to 3.15 in 1927 and 3.53 in 1935. According to Henryk Stępniak many Poles voted for the Catholic Zentrumspartei instead and, based on these assumed voting patterns, he estimates the number of Poles in the city to be 25-30% of Catholics living within it or about 30-36 thousand people. In addition around 4,000 Polish nationals were registered in the city, bringing the total number of Polish population to 9.4-11% of people in this estimate. According to other estimates about 10 percent of the 130,000 Catholics were Polish. Piotr Mickiewicz claims, the city authorities were made up of former Prussian officials who were hostile to Poland and Poles. According to Artur Hutnikiewicz the Polish population faced discrimination and persecution in the Free City, which it tried to resist. Poles faced discrimination from German officials in employment and in education. This constituted violation of international laws, which obliged the city to treat Poles equally to Germans.

The Free City of Danzig issued its own stamps and currency (the Gulden). Many examples of stamps and coins, bearing the legend Freie Stadt Danzig, survive in collections.

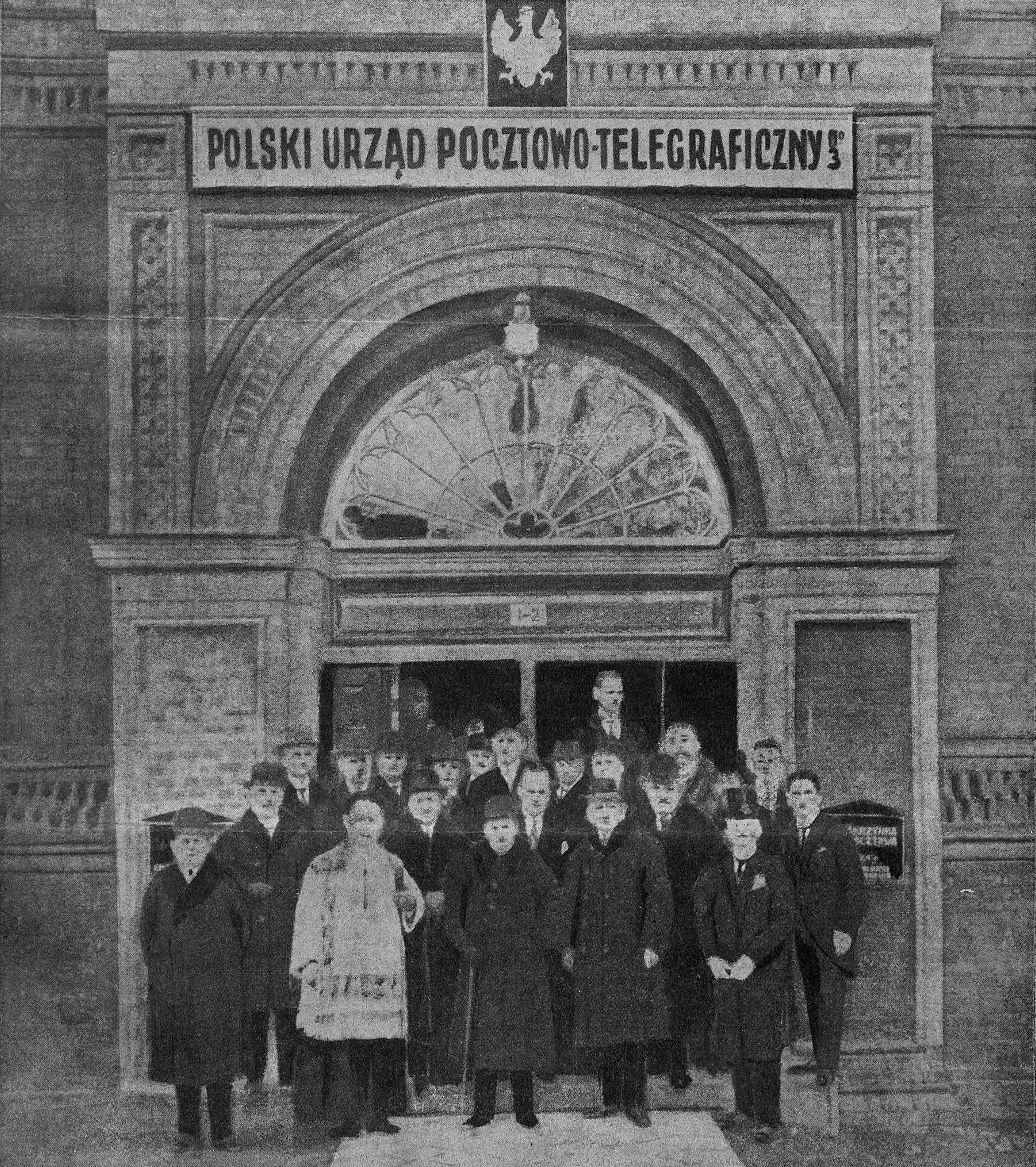
Opening of the Polish Post Office No. 3 in 1925

The strategic aim of Poland was to gain free access to the open sea, and the territories assigned to Poland in the Treaty of Versailles provided a good opportunity to do so. However, during the Polish-Soviet War, Danzig workers went on strike to block delivery of ammunition to the Polish army when the Soviet Red Army tried to capture Warsaw. The Second Polish Republic then built a military transit depot with a small squad of troops at Westerplatte.

Due to the massive resentment by the Danzigers and with large foreign investments, Poland began building a large military port in Gdynia, just 25 km (16 miles) away from Danzig. Unlike Danzig, Gdynia was in the direct possession of Poland and soon became the so-called "Polish outside window".

Due to a German-Polish customs war between 1925 and 1934, Poland became focused on international trade; for example, a new railway line was built to connect Silesia with the coast and the new tariffs made it cheaper to send goods through Polish ports rather than German ones. Gdynia became the biggest port on the Baltic sea. Nevertheless, Poland resorted to economic sanctions during the Danzig-Polish conflicts and Danzig suffered greatly. There was a strong desire to rescind the Allied Powers' decision on the status of the city's 400,000 citizens which were predominantly German. This culminated in the election of a National Socialist government in Danzig's elections in May 1933.

The German incorporation of Danzig was a territorial claim that every government of the Weimar Republic put on its agenda.

A German–Polish declaration of non-aggression was signed and the Free City's government was ordered by the Nazis to stop making problems between Poland and Danzig. Poland and Danzig entered a brief period of good economic cooperation and prosperity. Nevertheless, a totalitarian society was being constructed in Germany, and especially members of the Polish or Jewish minority required stamina in the face of everyday acts of violence and persecution from the Nazis.

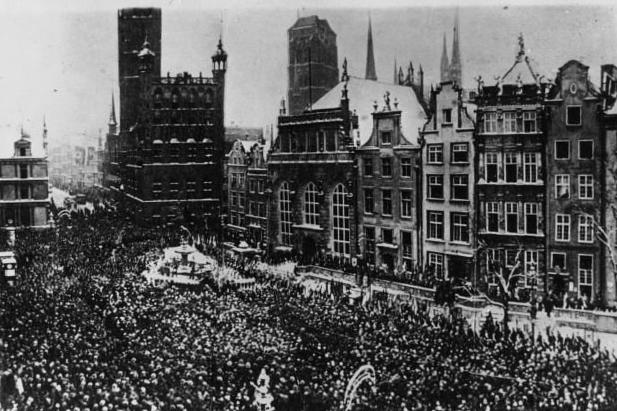
Pro-Germany rally at the Long Market (1933)

With the growth of Nazism among Germans, anti-Polish sentiment increased and both Germanisation and segregation policies intensified, in the 1930s the rights of local Poles were commonly violated and limited by the local administration. Polish children were refused admission to public Polish-language schools, premises were not allowed to be rented to Polish schools and preschools. Due to such policies, only 8 Polish-language public schools existed in the city, and Poles managed to organize 7 more private Polish schools. In 1937, Poles who sent their children to private Polish schools were demanded to transfer children to German schools, under threat of police intervention, and attacks were carried out on Polish schools and Polish youth.

German militias carried out numerous beatings of Polish activists, scouts, and even mailmen, as "punishment" for distributing the Polish press. German students attacked and expelled Polish students from the technical university. Dozens of Polish surnames were forcibly Germanized, while Polish symbols that reminded that for centuries Danzig was part of Poland were removed from the city's landmarks, such as the Artus Court and the Neptune's Fountain.

From 1937, the employment of Poles by German companies was prohibited, and already employed Poles were fired, the use of Polish in public places was banned and Poles were not allowed to enter several restaurants, in particular those owned by Germans. In 1938, the Germans committed over 100 attacks on Polish homes on the day of the Polish 3 May Constitution Day. In 1939, before the German invasion of Poland and outbreak of World War II, local Polish railwaymen were victims of beatings and arrests.

About 50 percent of members of the Jewish Community of Danzig had left the city within a year after a pogrom in October 1937, after the Kristallnacht riots in November 1938 the community decided to organize its emigration and in March 1939 a first transport to Mandate Palestine started. By September 1939 barely 1,700 mostly elderly Jews remained. In early 1941 just 600 Jews were still living in Danzig who were later deported to the ghetto in Warsaw or to Theresienstadt. The majority of them were later sent to various extermination camps. Out of the 2938 Jewish community in the city 1227 were able to escape from the Nazis before the outbreak of war

=== World War II (1939–1945) ===
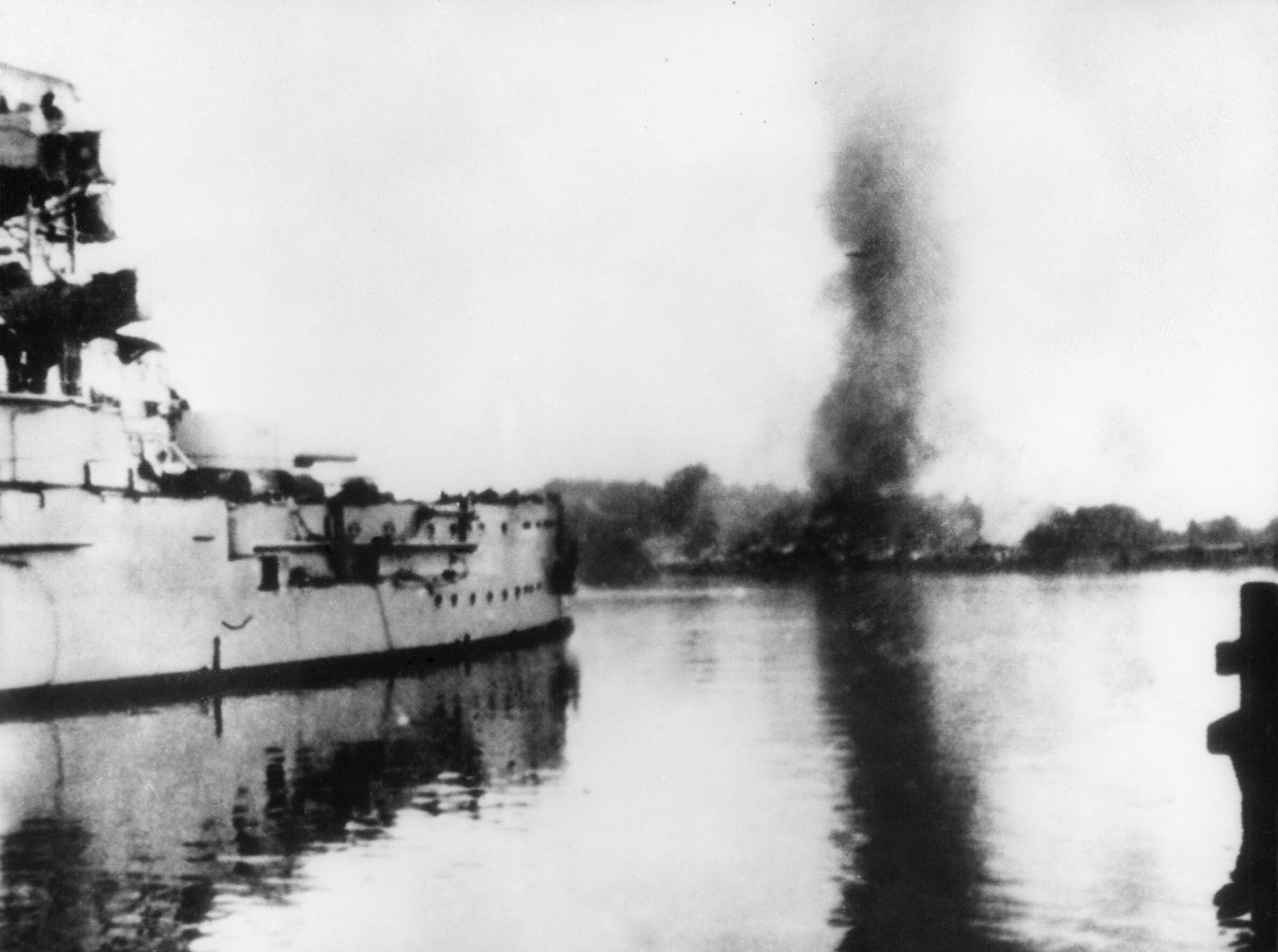
German battleship SMS Schleswig-Holstein firing at the Polish Military Transit Depot during the battle of Westerplatte in September 1939

Following the annexation of Austria and the Sudetenland, Germany in October 1938 urged the Danzig territory's cession to Germany. On 1 September 1939 Nazi Germany invaded Poland, initiating World War II. On 2 September 1939 Germany officially annexed the Free City. The Nazi regime murdered the Polish postmen defending the Polish Post Office: this was one of the first war crimes during the war. Other Polish soldiers defending the Westerplatte stronghold surrendered after seven days of fighting. The German commander returned the sword to the Polish commander for putting up a brave fight, while the same time one the captured defenders, Kazimierz Rasinski was brutally tortured by Germans and murdered when he refused to reveal Polish communication codes. On 1 September, the Germans assaulted the Polish Railway Administration and arrested its chief and employees. Captain Tadeusz Ziółkowski, who refused to allow the German battleship SMS Schleswig-Holstein to enter the port in the prior days, was also arrested, and then sent to Stutthof and murdered in 1940. On 7 September, NSDAP organised night parade on Adolf-Hitlerstrasse to celebrate success. It was bombed by a single Polish hydroplane operating from Hel Peninsula piloted by Józef Rudzki and Zdzisław Juszczakiewicz. Six bombs each weighing 12.5 kg (28 lb) were dropped from very low height. In October 1939, Danzig, together with the prewar Pomeranian Voivodship to the south and west, became the German Reichsgau (administrative district) of Danzig-West Prussia. With the start of the war the Nazi regime began its policy of extermination in Pomerania; Poles, Kashubians and Jews and the political opposition were sent to concentration camps, especially neighbouring Stutthof where 85,000 victims perished. In September 1939, the Germans carried out arrests of over 800 Polish railwaymen, who were then deported to concentration camps and murdered in the following months. Also those arrested before the war were executed in various locations. The Germans also carried out mass arrests and executions of local Polish activists, even those who escaped to Gdynia and Warsaw. 29 Polish teachers from the city were murdered, and others were deported to concentration camps. Execution sites of said Poles included Piaśnica, Sztutowo, Nowy Port, Westerplatte and Berlin, whereas the defenders of the Polish Post were massacred in Zaspa.

The Einsatzkommando 16, SS Heimwehr-Sturmbann Gotze and SS Heimwehr Danzig, were formed in the city, before entering Polish Pomerania to commit crimes against Poles. Members of the local SS became leaders of the newly established German Selbstschutz in German-occupied Gdynia.

Danzig served as a key arrival port in the Nazi-organised resettlement of Baltic Germans under the Heim ins Reich program, where ethnic German evacuees were ceremonially received as part of the regime's propagandised "homecoming" to the Reich.

During the war, the Germans operated a Nazi prison in the city, an Einsatzgruppen-operated penal camp, a camp for Romani people, two subcamps of the Stalag XX-B prisoner-of-war camp for Allied POWs, and several subcamps of the Stutthof concentration camp within the present-day city limits. In August 1944, also two assembly centers for Allied POWs (AGSSt 32 and 33) were established by the Germans in the city, and were soon moved to other locations in German-occupied Poland and France.

In the city itself hundreds of prisoners were subjected to cruel Nazi executions and experiments, which included castration of men and sterilization of women considered dangerous to the "purity of Nordic race" and beheading by guillotine The courts and judicial system in the annexed territories of Nazi Germany was one of the main ways to legislate an extermination policy against ethnic Poles, terminology in the courts was full of statements such as "Polish subhumans" and "Polish rabble". Some judges even declared that Poles were to have tougher sentences than Germans because of their alleged racial inferiority.

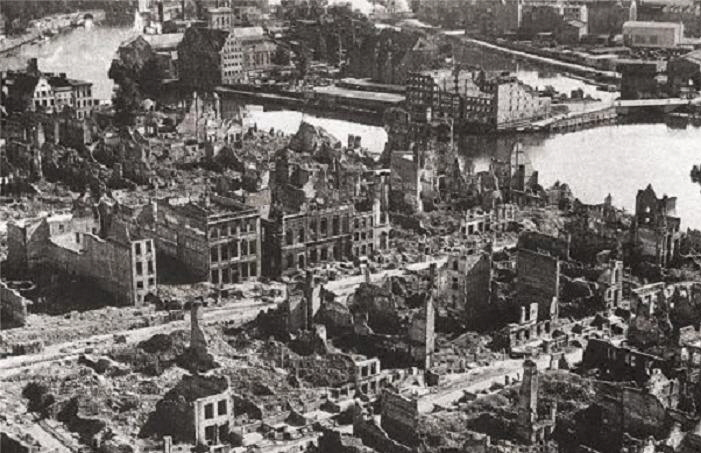
Gdańsk downtown destroyed by air strikes and artillery fire (1945)

The Polish resistance movement was active in the city. The Poles smuggled documents about German V-weapons, infiltrated the local German industry, plus one of Pomerania's main smuggling points for underground Polish press was located in the city. The resistance also facilitated escapes of endangered Polish resistance members and British prisoners of war who fled from German POW camps via the city's port to neutral Sweden. The Home Army also co-operated with the local vice-consul of Denmark.

At the beginning of 1945, facing the imminent fall of the Nazi State, Germany started evacuating civilians from Danzig. Most Germans fled the city, many by seaborne evacuation to Schleswig-Holstein. This happened in winter under the threat of bombs and in constant danger of submarines.

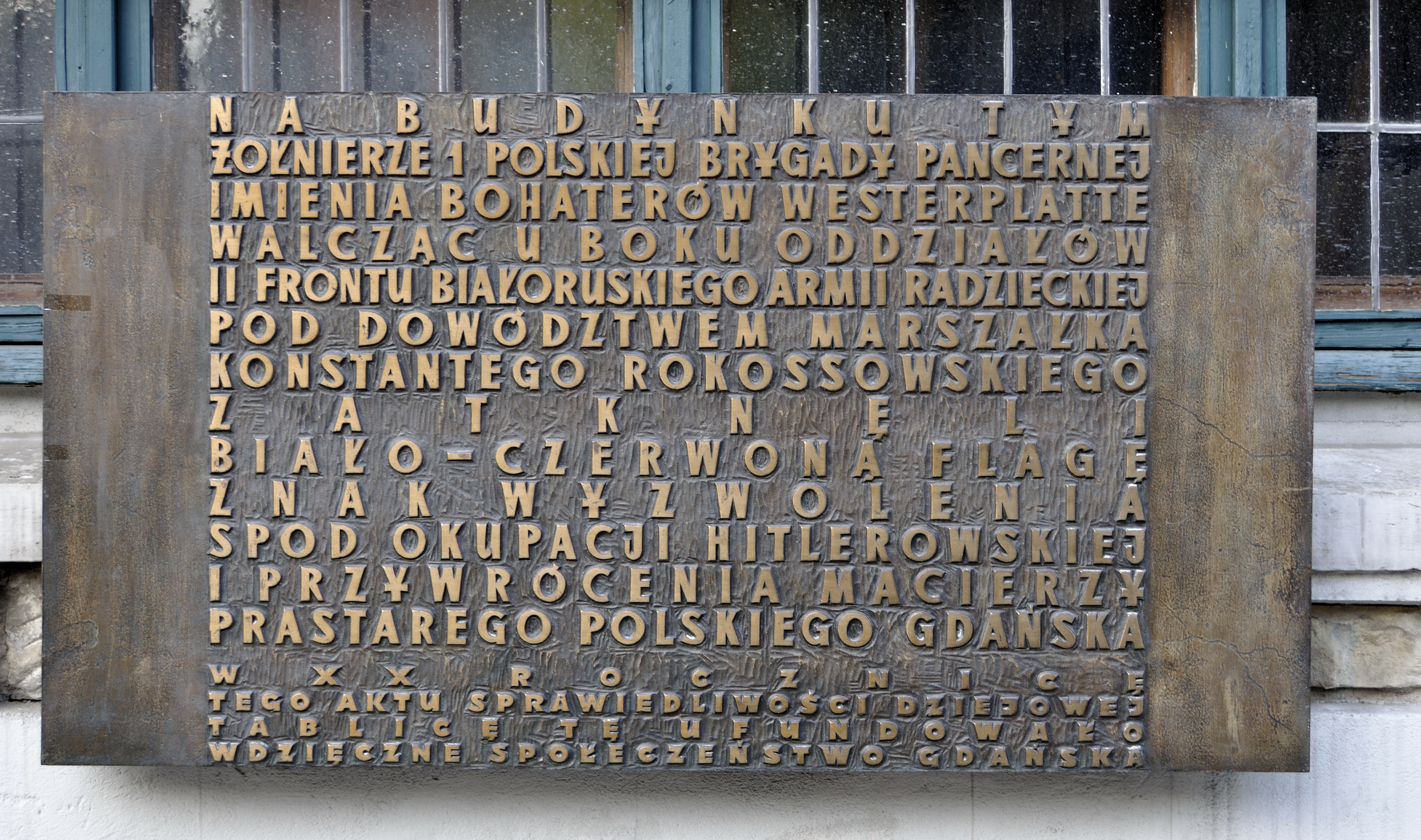
Plaque at the Artus Court commemorating the return of Gdańsk to Poland in 1945

The city was besieged and captured by Polish and Soviet troops in March 1945. The city was heavily damaged and Soviet soldiers and German saboteurs set fire to houses. Soviet soldiers committed large-scale rape and looting, especially of the port, shipyard and factories. The exact circumstances of the Soviet occupation remain a matter of dispute. While the traditional Polish historiography stressed the role of the German resistance, after 1990 reports about deliberate destructions and arsons by the Soviets were published. However, as Soviet sources about the events are inaccessible, the topic has not been conclusively clarified. In December 1945 the Soviet Consulate explained the existing "anti-Soviet feelings" with some "excesses" of the Red Army.

=== Post-World War II ===
In February 1945, only months before the Nazi German defeat, the Yalta Conference agreed to place Gdańsk under de facto administration of Poland, and this decision was confirmed at the Potsdam Conference.

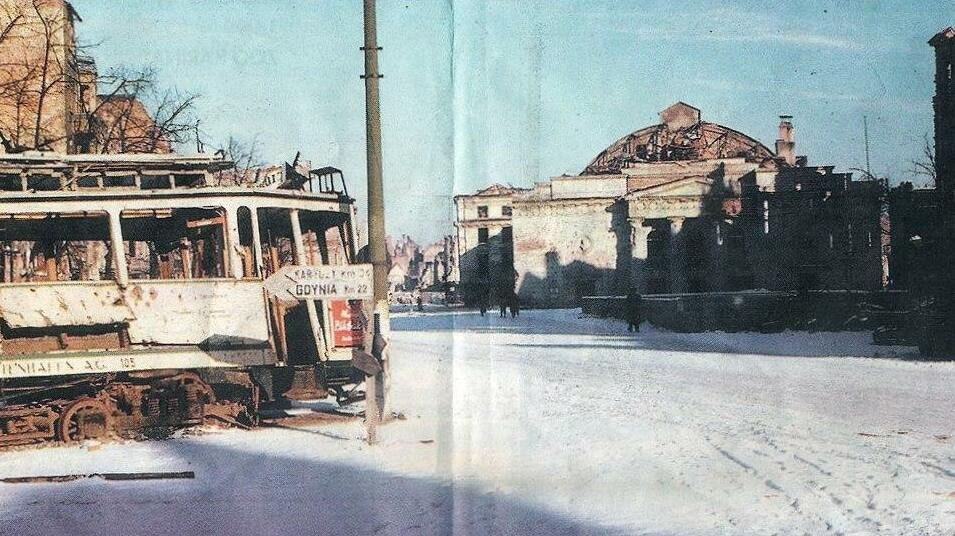
Targ Węglowy in 1946

A Polish administration was set up in the city on 30 March 1945. New Polish residents were settled, 3,200 in April and more than 4,000 in May and June 1945. The outflow of Germans from Danzig began around mid-April 1945, with the earliest departures occurring voluntarily rather than by force. However, in June 1945, the situation changed with the issuance of the first of several military directives calling for the prompt expulsion of the German population. In June 1945 124,000 Germans and 8,000 Poles lived in the city. The deportation of the German populace started in July 1945, thus the pre-war populace soon became a small minority within post-war Gdańsk. By 1948 more than two thirds of the 150,000 inhabitants came from central Poland, about 15-18% from Polish-speaking areas east of the Curzon Line that were annexed by the Soviet Union after World War II. Many local Kashubians also moved into the city. The members of the pre-war Polish minority in the city organized associations dedicated to upholding their past traditions and history, such as Towarzystwo Przyjaciół Gdańska (Society of Friends of Gdańsk).

The old districts of Gdańsk, before they suffered wholesale devastation during the Soviet offensive in 1945, contained over 5,000 historically valuable structures, and the Main City (German: Rechtstadt) alone included more than 1,000 houses. The historic area was 90% destroyed as a result of the war, with the destruction of the Main City exceeding this percentage – just under 40 residential buildings survived there.

Initially, the reconstruction of Gdańsk was controversial. Because of anti-German sentiments and the new settlers' attitudes, modern architecture was preferred. The decision to recreate historical buildings was politically motivated in order to symbolize the city's reunification with Poland. Between 1952 and the late 1960s, Polish architects and artisans reconstructed the historic center, aiming to restore its presumed 16th- and 17th-century appearance while intentionally omitting architectural additions from the Kingdom of Prussia period. Due to this approach and limited resources, the reconstruction efforts were significantly restricted, and outside the Main City, for example in the Old Town, only the major landmarks were to be rebuilt. The reconstruction was not tied to Gdańsk's pre-war appearance, instead, its goal was to recreate an idealized state from before the partitions of Poland. Architecture from the 19th and early 20th centuries, along with any traces of German tradition, was ignored or dismissed as "Prussian barbarism" and deemed worthy of demolition, while Flemish-Dutch, Italian, and French influences were emphasized. After 1990 this concept has been criticized by Donald Tusk, who called the reconstruction "in the spirit of Communism" the city's second catastrophe of the 20th century.

The city districts were renamed to their historic Polish names (such as Wrzeszcz, Siedlce, Nowy Port), but in some cases the specifications of the Commission for the Determination of Place Names were initially ignored and place names originating in the home region of the settlers were used.

In 1946, the Soviet-installed communist regime executed 17-year-old Danuta Siedzikówna and 42-year-old Feliks Selmanowicz, Polish resistance members, in the local prison.

The port of Gdańsk was one of the three Polish ports through which Greeks and Macedonians, refugees of the Greek Civil War, reached Poland. In 1949, four transports of Greek and Macedonian refugees arrived at the port of Gdańsk, from where they were transported to new homes in Poland.

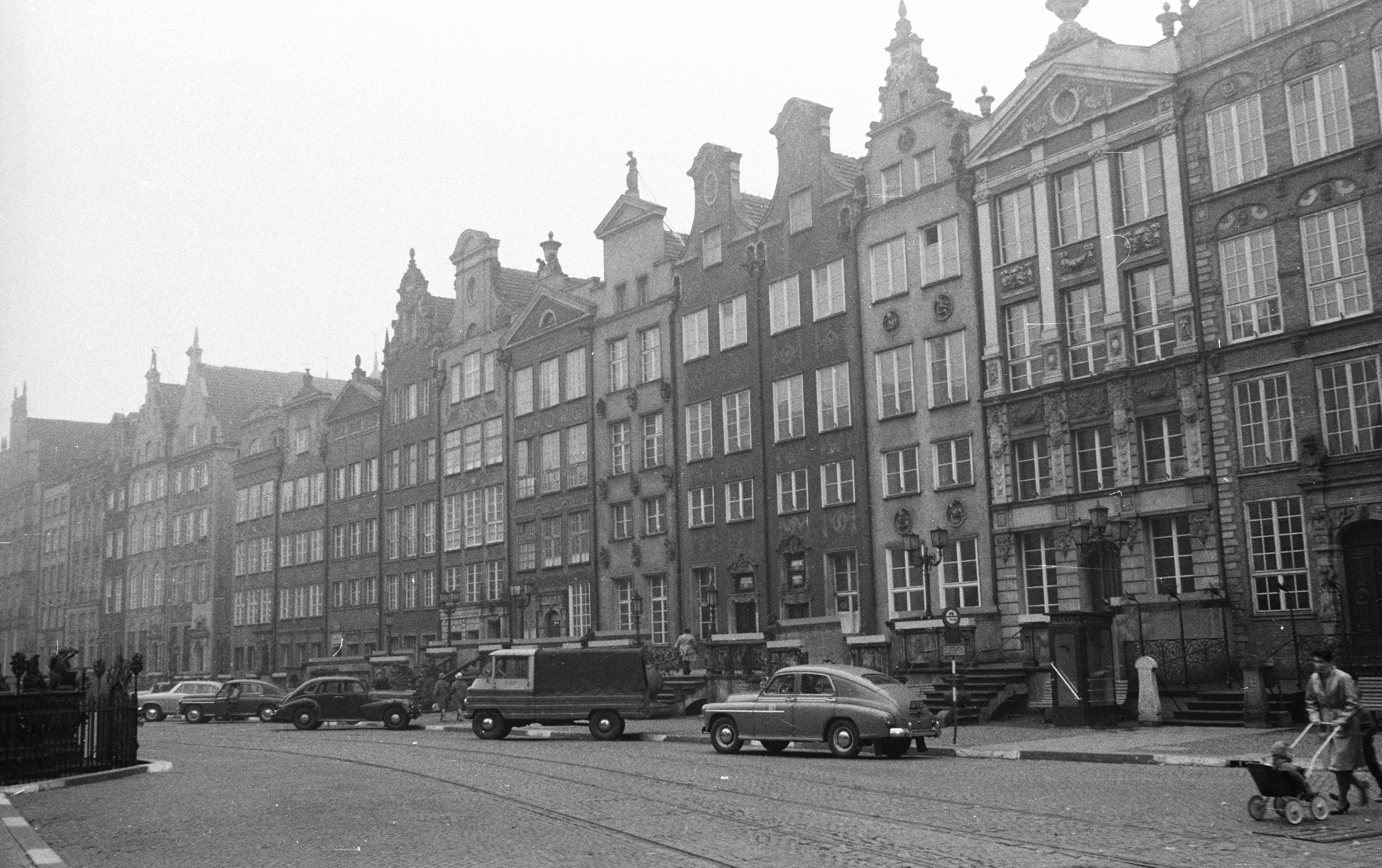
Długi Targ in the 1960s

Gdańsk was the scene of anti-government demonstrations which led to the downfall of Poland's communist leader Władysław Gomułka in December 1970, and ten years later was the birthplace of the Solidarity trade union movement, whose opposition to the government helped end of communist party rule in 1989 and the election as president of Poland of its leader Lech Wałęsa. It remains today a major port and industrial city.

A list of the 173 mayors of the city from 1347 to March 1945 was compiled by the current Gdańsk city government and can be found on their recent website with the invitation for the "First World Gdańsk Reunion", which took place in May 2002.

In 2014, the remains of Danuta Siedzikówna and Feliks Selmanowicz were found at the local Garrison Cemetery, and then their state burial was held in Gdańsk in 2016, with the participation of thousands of people from all over Poland and the highest Polish authorities.

In recent history, Gdańsk has co-hosted various international sports competitions, including the EuroBasket 2009, 2011 FIVB Volleyball World League, UEFA Euro 2012, 2013 Men's European Volleyball Championship, 2014 FIVB Volleyball Men's World Championship, 2016 European Men's Handball Championship, 2017 Men's European Volleyball Championship, 2021 Men's European Volleyball Championship, 2022 FIVB Volleyball Women's World Championship, 2023 World Men's Handball Championship and 2023 FIVB Volleyball Men's Nations League.

=== Famous people born in the city ===
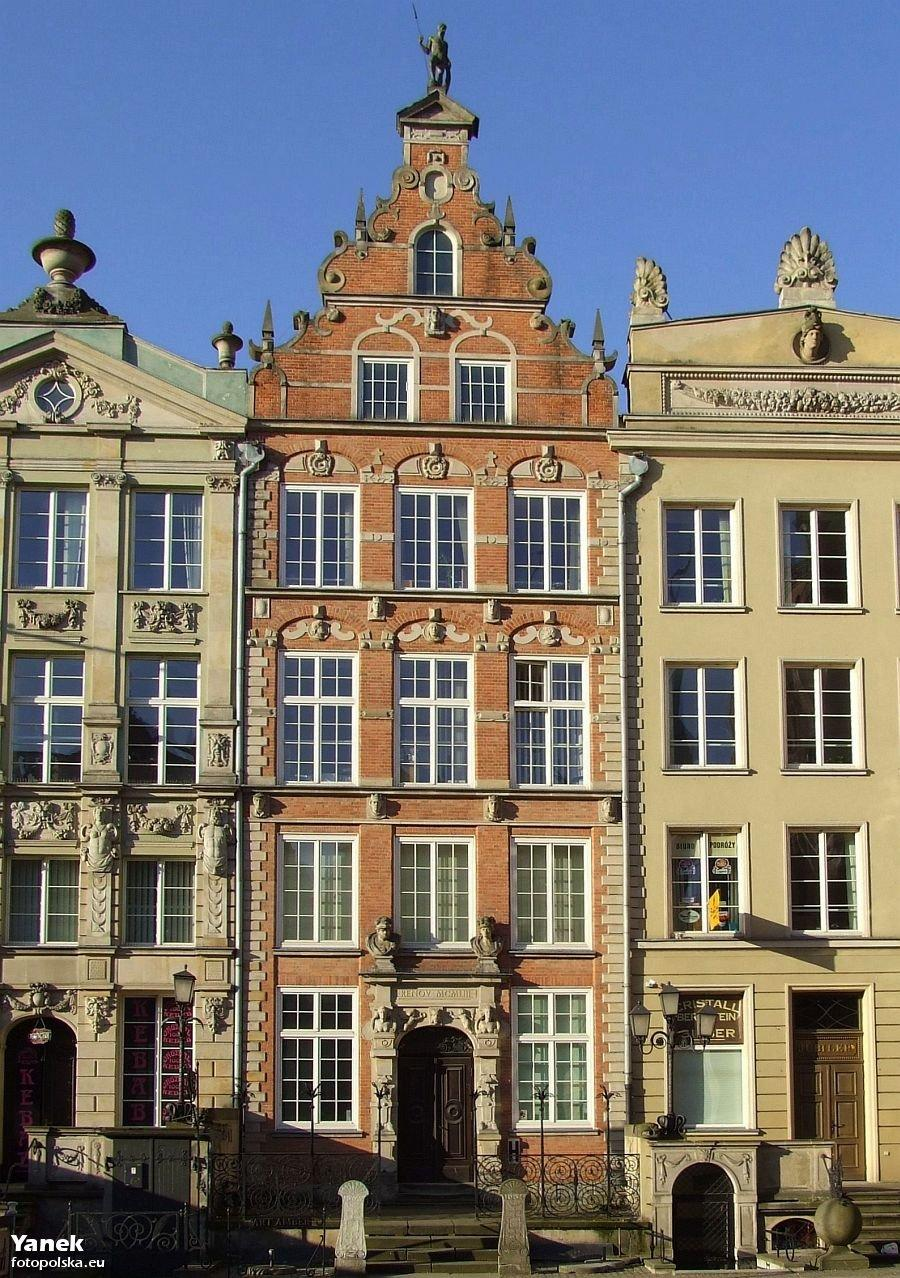
Birthplace of Aleksander Benedykt Sobieski

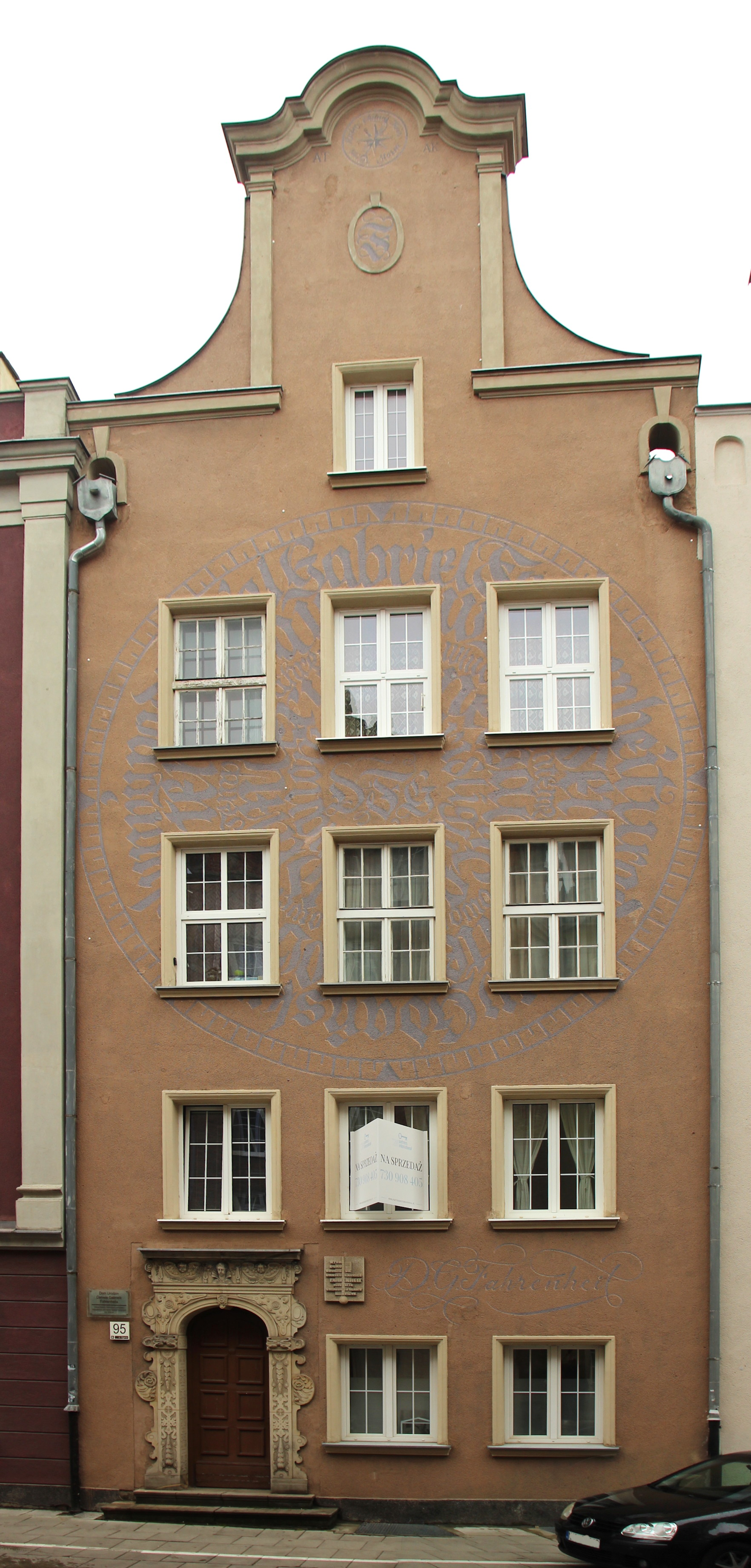
Birthplace of Daniel Gabriel Fahrenheit

- List of people from Gdańsk
- List of mayors of Gdańsk
- List of mayors of Danzig
- Johannes Dantiscus, 1485, poet, diplomat, church canon and bishop
- Bernhard von Reesen, 1490
- Albrecht Giese, 1524
- Johannes Hevelius, 1611, astronomer
- Daniel Schultz, 1615
- Bogusław Radziwiłł, 1620, Polish princely magnate
- Andreas Schlüter, 1660
- Aleksander Benedykt Sobieski, 1677, Polish prince
- Jacob Theodor Klein, 1685
- Daniel Gabriel Fahrenheit, 1686–1736, physicist and engineer
- Daniel Gralath, 1708, physicist and mayor
- Louise Adelgunde Gottsched, 1713, writer
- Daniel Chodowiecki, 1726, painter
- Adam Kazimierz Czartoryski, 1734, Polish statesman and writer
- Michał Jerzy Poniatowski, 1736, Archbishop of Gniezno and Primate of Poland, brother of King Stanisław August Poniatowski
- Johann Wilhelm Archenholz, 1741
- Avraham Danzig, 1748, rabbi
- Georg Forster, 1754
- Gottlieb Hufeland. 1760
- Johanna Schopenhauer, 1766
- Johannes Daniel Falk, 1768
- Władysław Franciszek Jabłonowski, 1769, Polish general
- Arthur Schopenhauer, 1788
- Miltiades Caridis, 1923, conductor
- Günter Grass, 1927, writer and philosopher
- Zdzisław Kuźniar, 1931, actor
- Janusz Kupcewicz, 1955, footballer
- Paweł Huelle, 1957, writer and journalist
- Donald Tusk, 1957, Prime Minister of Poland (2007–2014, 2023–present), President of the European Council (2014–2019), President of the European People's Party (2019–2022)
- Dariusz Michalczewski "Tiger", 1968, boxer who won WBO (Light heavyweight) title in 1994, and then defended that title 23 consecutive times, Tiger Energy Drink was named after him
- Leszek Możdżer, 1971, jazz musician

=== Famous people living or working in the city ===
- Edward O'Rourke, the first bishop of the Diocese of Danzig
- Lech Wałęsa, b. 1943, Nobel Peace Prize laureate in 1983, first directly elected president of Poland (1990)
- Stanisław Pestka, b. 1929 in Rolbik - Kashubian poet
- Robert Gordon b. 1668, d. 1731, Merchant and philanthropist

== See also ==
- Timeline of Gdańsk history
- List of Gdańsk aristocratic families
- Lists of Danzig officials
- List of mayors of Danzig
