= List of Danzig officials =

The city of Danzig (Gdańsk) from 1308 to 1945 had various offices, like mayor, councillor, burgrave. Also, separate city parts (Rechtstadt, Altstadt) had representants of their own for some time.

== Mayors ==
see List of city mayors of Gdańsk

== Councillors of the Altstadt ==
Councillors of the de:Danziger Altstadt

1. Nicklaus Wilde 1433 1433 1433
2. Peter Becker 1433 1437 1437
3. Eggert Steinbauer 1433 1450
4. Nicklaus Witte 1433 1434 1434
5. Hanss Pretzman 1433 1436
6. Nicklaus Engels 1433 1450
7. Jordan Leberstein 1433 1435 1436
8. Berent Glantz 1433 1433
9. Arent Klatz 1433 1433
10. Henrich Schniert 1433 1433
11. Nicklaus Friedlandt 1433 1439 1454
12. Nicklaus Dietrich 1435 1436
13. Hanss Götteke 1435 1448 1448
14. Balthasar Gutte 1435 1443 1453
15. Nickeas Fischer 1439 1440 1448
16. Matthis Schönaw
17. Peter Stoltzefuss
18. Paul Behmen
19. Augustin Glunitz
20. Nicklas Zanckenzin 1445 1452 1479
21. Jacob Gremlin 1445 1470
22. Matthias Kalow 1445 1445
23. Matthis Schoppe 1445 1450
24. Simon Gottlund 1445 1445
25. Nicklas Herman 1445 1454
26. Marten Kandeler 1456 1462
27. George Herman 1451 1463
28. Pawel Blossholtz 1451 1452
29. Hanss Möller 1455
30. Marten Erdman 1455
31. 1455 Nicklaus Wilcke 1464
32. Marten Gratken 1485
33. 1455 Lorentz Falcke 1468
34. Lawe 1474
35. Hanss Katzenbecke 1461
36. Wicentz Roggar 1456
37. Peter Behme 1456
38. Nicklas Zoppe 1463
39. Marten Scherenschmidt 1471
40. Andreas Grewe 1457 1472
41. Casper Heineman 1463 1464
42. Andreas Goltke 1477
43. 1456 Michael Weideman 1456
44. 1456 Maarten Wittenberg 1463
45. Baltzer Angelmacher 1457 1463
46. 1457 Thomas Wolste 1466
47. Nicklas Hosesang
48. Ertman Ranteke 1463
49. 1462 Hanss Drantzke 1463
50. 1463 Nicklaus Gottschalck 1464
51. Hanss Hübener
52. Casper Lumpe 1464 1477
53. 1464 George Behme 1465 1488
54. Casper Fischer 1465 1488
55. Lenhard Hawer 1473 1473
56. Andreas Fantzke 1476
57. 1465 Hanss Bergman 1477
58. Baltzer Sattler 1498
59. Jacob Krentzeler 1472
60. 1467 Josep Toppel 1478 1500
61. Nicklaus Schultz 1447 1492

== Councillors of the Rechtstadt ==
Councillors of the Danziger de:Rechtstadt were numerous, over 700.

== Royal burgraves ==
Over 200
