= Gdańsk Castle =

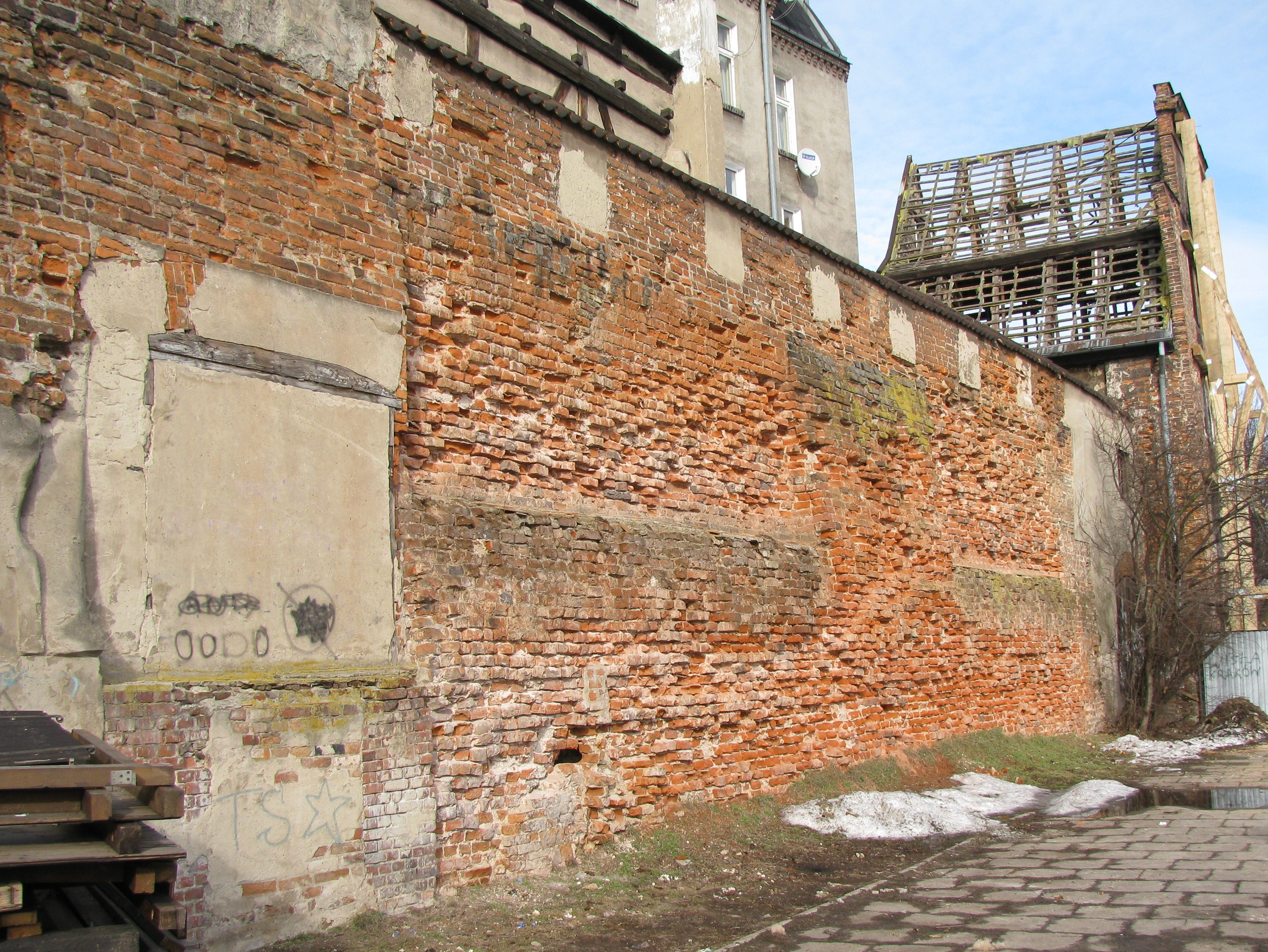
- Remnants of the castle walls
- Interactive map of the Gdańsk Castle area

General information
- Coordinates: 54°21′14″N 18°39′36″E
- Construction started: After 1335 (likely 1337 or 1338)
- Completed: Mid- to late 14th century
- Demolished: 1454
- Owner: State of the Teutonic Order

The Gdańsk Castle (Polish: Zamek w Gdańsku) was a large castle that existed in the modern-day Old Town of the city of Gdańsk (also known in German as Danzig) from the mid-14th century until it was taken down in 1454. It was constructed and managed by the State of the Teutonic Order. Some of its remnants are on the regional heritage list.

== Characteristics ==
No plans or depictions of the Gdańsk Castle from its own time have survived. It is believed that the castle may have been partly depicted in a 14th-century painting titled The Ship of the Church, but interpretations of which parts of the city of Gdańsk are depicted in the painting vary heavily. However, numerous academic reconstructions of the castle's likely appearance have been created, and multiple elements of the castle are known of in detail.

=== Location ===
The Gdańsk Castle was located northeast of the Main City and southeast of the Old Town. It was located in the modern-day Old Town, beside Wartka and Sukiennicza Streets. It was found on the shores of the Radunia Canal (constructed around the same time as the castle) and the Motława.

=== Elements and structures ===
The central part of the castle was called the High Castle (Zamek Wysoki). It was the first part of the structure to be completed, being in use from c. 1350 onwards. It was expanded in the 1380s and 1390s, during which it suffered a major fire. It measured 60 metres (200 ft) by 63 metres (207 ft), with an internal courtyard surrounded by a cloister. The rooms here were typical for a medieval castle interior, such as a chapter house, refectory, and a set of dormitories, as well as, among others, a chapel, a treasury, a scriptorium, an armoury, a kitchen, a mixed-use basement–pantry, and a wardrobe.

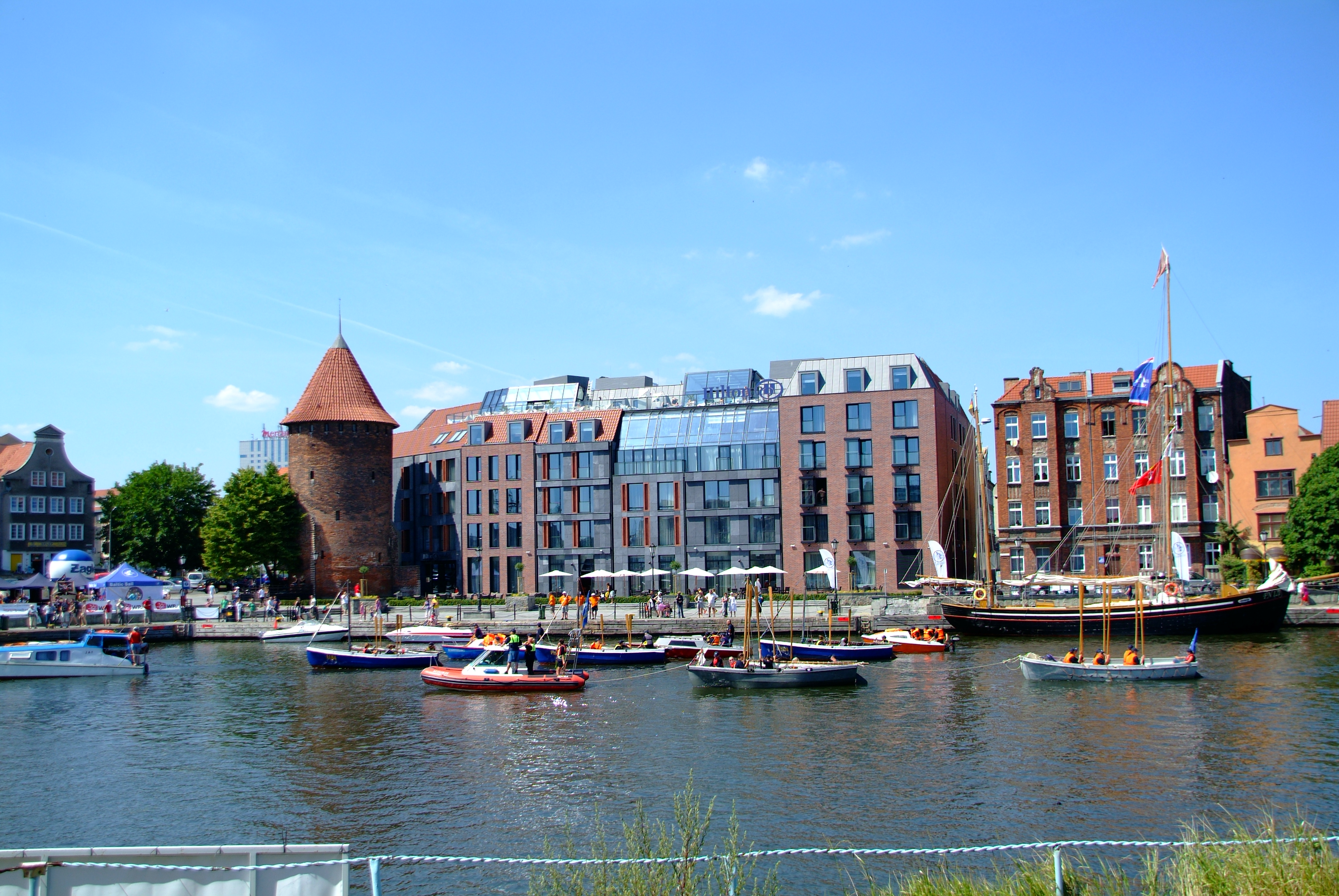
The modern-day neighbourhood of Zamczysko, found at the former site of the castle, with the Swan Tower on the left

To its north and west, the High Castle was surrounded by an outer bailey, surrounded by walls and wall towers; the wall tower positioned the furthest northwest, the today still extant Swan Tower (Baszta Łabędź), controlled access to the river port of Gdańsk. Locations in the outer bailey included a crossbow workshop, a sewer's shop, and the commander's stables. During the Polish–Lithuanian–Teutonic War of 1409–1411, a hospital was established in the outer bailey.

=== Defence ===
Between 1384 and 1437, the Gdańsk Castle was armed with 3 large guns, as well as multiple mid-sized and smaller ones (8 in 1384, 11 in 1413, 22 in 1428, and 60 in 1434). Many members of the Teutonic Order resided in the castle, ranging from 32 to 35 over the years.

=== Related properties ===
Numerous other sites, primarily found in the Old Town, were also counted as being owned by the holder of the castle; these were the Great Mill, the nearby Little Mill (which was actually a granary), a bathhouse, a bakery, a brickworks (located in Zaroślak), and a carpenter's workshop (located on Ołowianka). A large amount of land on Ostrów Island also belonged to the castle, including a stable, a saddler's workshop, a cattle ranch, and a forge.

== History ==
=== Background and construction ===
After the Teutonic takeover of Gdańsk in 1308, the new city government installed by the Teutonic Order began using the site of a gord that had been the seat of the dukes of Gdańsk and of Pomerelia as their own seat of governance. The position of commander (Komtur) of Danzig was one of the highest-ranking and most notable in the entire State of the Teutonic Order, and the duties collected by the commander of the busy port allowed for undertakings such as castle construction.

It is not known exactly when the castle was constructed. It was constructed after 1335 and was, according to historian Beata Możejko, already being constructed by 1337 and 1338; she has written that 1338 was the likeliest date for the start of construction. It was built on the orders of the Grand Master of the Teutonic Order, Dietrich von Altenburg. The castle was completed by the late 14th century.

=== Notable events ===
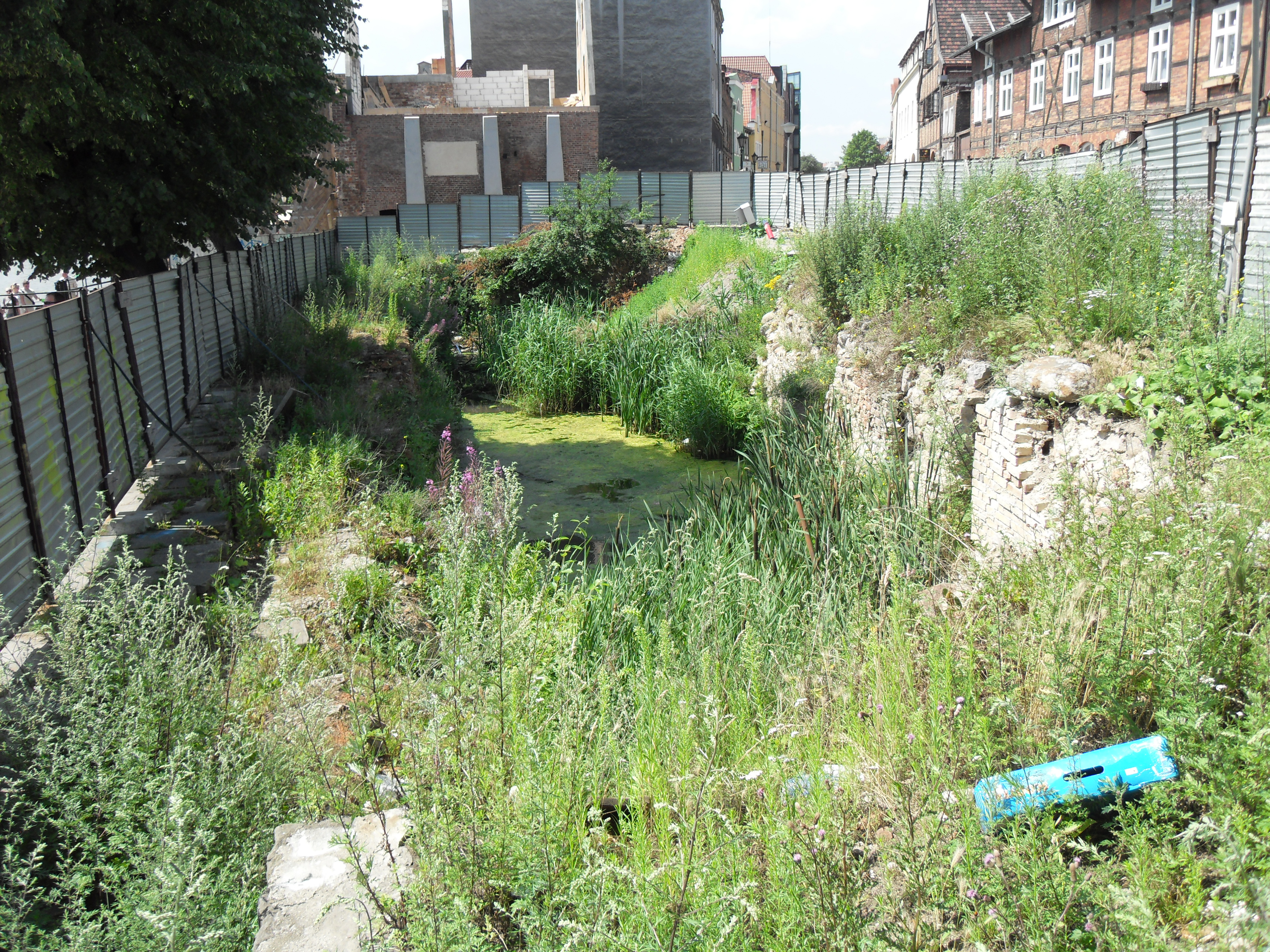
Excavated remains of the destroyed castle

A new eastern castle moat was created in 1371 following changes to the course of the Vistula. On the night of 15–16 October 1394, the castle caught on fire and was destroyed, with rebuilding efforts continuing up to 1396. During the Polish–Lithuanian–Teutonic War of 1409–1411, the city of Danzig surrendered to the Polish king, Władysław II Jagiełło. Many attempts were made to force the castle into capitulating, but they were not successful, and Władysław Jagiełło ultimately made a deal with commander Johann von Schönfeld that, if the Malbork Castle were to fall, the gates of the Gdańsk Castle would be opened. The Malbork Castle did not fall; the hostile actions of the city of Danzig towards the higher authorities of the Teutonic Order during the war ultimately resulted in the execution of two of its mayors.

In 1454, the Thirteen Years' War began, and an anti-Teutonic popular uprising broke out in Gdańsk. The commander of the castle surrendered in the first year of the war, and the castle was promptly taken apart, as to destroy a symbol of the city's subjugation and to prevent any future use of it against the city. The castle was taken down in a month.

== Remnants and legacy ==
The only presently surviving parts of the castle are small sections of the castle walls, found along the shore of the Motława on Wartka Street, and the Swan Tower. Occasionally, bricks and other structural elements of the castle are found under its former site. The former site of the castle, Zamczysko (derived from the Polish word zamek 'castle'), was not again built up until 1648; that area is still known under that castle-derived name today and is the site of buildings dating back to the 17th century.
