= Left-wing politics =

Political ideologies favouring egalitarianism

Left-wing politics, leftist politics, and leftism are descriptions within the left–right political spectrum for a range of political ideologies that generally support and seek to achieve social equality and egalitarianism. Left-wing politics typically involve a concern for those in society whom its adherents perceive as disadvantaged relative to others as well as a belief that there are unjustified inequalities that need to be reduced or abolished.

Ideologies considered to be left-wing vary greatly depending on the placement along the political spectrum in a given time and place. At the end of the 18th century, upon the founding of the first liberal democracies, the term Left was used to describe liberalism in the United States and republicanism in France, supporting a lesser degree of hierarchical decision-making than the right-wing politics of the traditional conservatives and monarchists. In modern politics, the term Left typically applies to ideologies and movements to the left of classical liberalism, supporting some degree of democracy in the economic sphere.

Today, ideologies such as social liberalism and social democracy are considered to be centre-left, while the Left is typically reserved for movements more critical of capitalism, including the labour movement, socialism, anarchism, communism, Marxism, Leninism and syndicalism, each of which rose to prominence in the 19th and 20th centuries. In addition, the term left-wing has also been applied to a broad range of culturally liberal and progressive social movements, including the civil rights movement, feminist movement, LGBTQ rights movement, abortion-rights movements, multiculturalism, anti-war movement, and environmental movement, as well as a wide range of political parties.‌

== Name ==
The terms left and right that make up the left–right political spectrum were coined during the French Revolution, referring to the seating arrangement in the French National Assembly. The political groups opposed to the royal veto privilege (Montagnard and Jacobin deputies from the Third Estate) generally sat to the left of the presiding member's chair in parliament, while the ones in favour of the royal veto privilege sat on its right.

Usage of the term left became more prominent after the restoration of the French monarchy in 1815, when it was applied to the Independents. The word wing was first appended to left and right factions in the late 19th century, usually with disparaging intent, and left-wing was applied to those who were unorthodox in their religious or political views.

== Positions ==
Political philosopher Marius Ostrowski argues that, despite various differences among factions, the left is primarily concerned with who wields power in society and with fighting for "those without" against "those with" who harm "those without". Ostrowski argues that the central value of the left is social equality, which is expressed in fighting for empowerment and against oppression, for parity and against hierarchy, for social recognition of marginalized groups and against discrimination, and for cooperation and against competition. Related concepts include justice, solidarity, cultural pluralism, social progress, and freedom from forceful control or coercion.

=== Economics ===
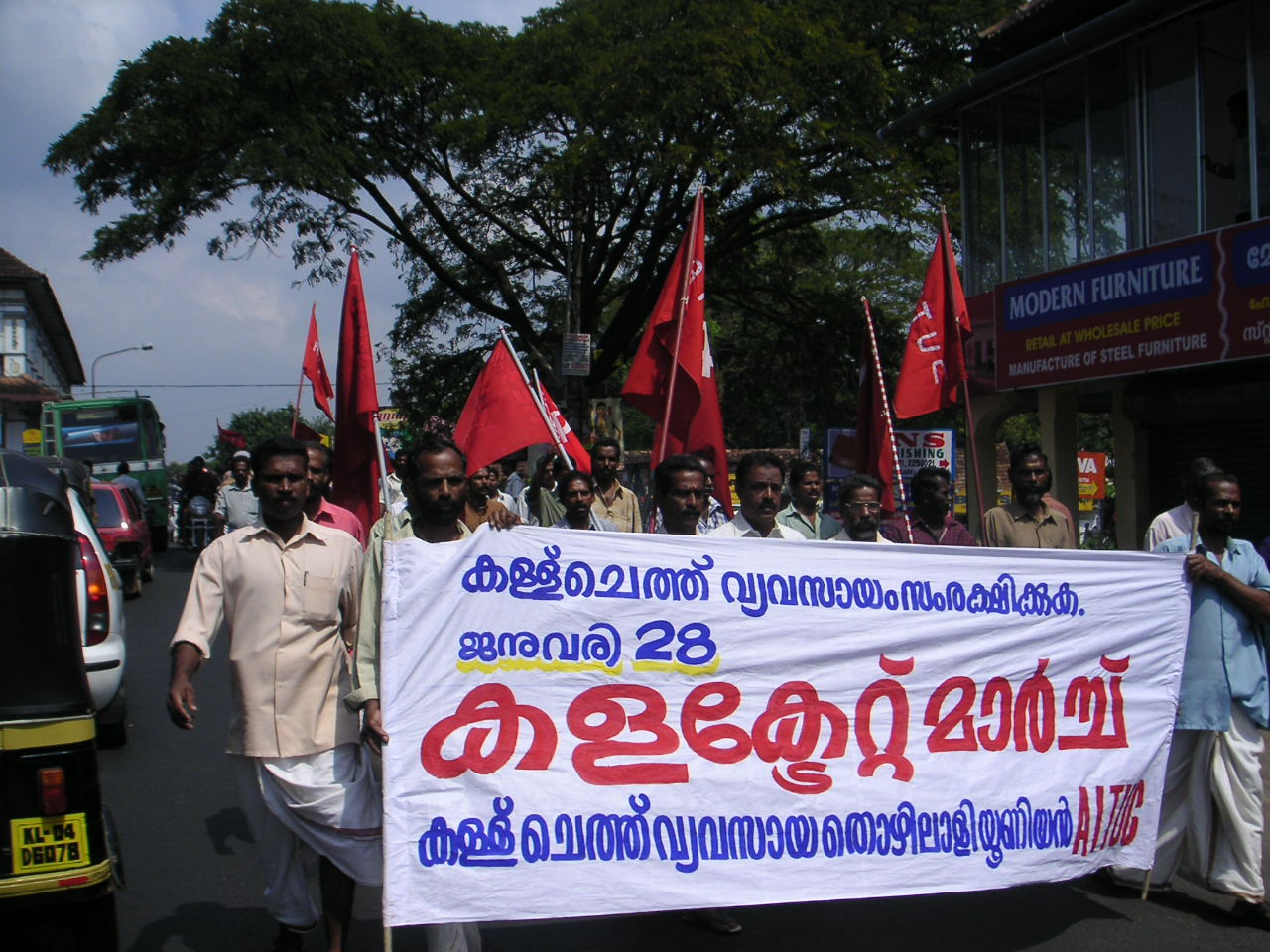
Members of the All India Trade Union Congress demonstrating in Alappuzha, Kerala

Left-leaning economic beliefs range from Keynesian economics and the welfare state through industrial democracy and the social market to the nationalisation of the economy and central planning, to the anarcho-syndicalist advocacy of a council-based and self-managed anarchist communism. Left-wing politics are typically associated with popular or state control of major political and economic institutions. According to emeritus professor of economics Barry Clark, supporters of left-wing politics "claim that human development flourishes when individuals engage in cooperative, mutually respectful relations that can thrive only when excessive differences in status, power, and wealth are eliminated." From the time of the Industrial Revolution, leftists have often supported trade unions.

Some leftists believe in Marxian economics, named after the economic theories of Karl Marx, but drawing from a range of Marxist and non-Marxist sources. Some distinguish Marx's economic theories from his political philosophy, arguing that Marx's approach to understanding the economy is independent of his advocacy of revolutionary socialism or his belief in the inevitability of a proletarian revolution.

The political relevance of farmers has divided the left. In Das Kapital, Marx scarcely mentioned the subject, though posthumous studies of his notebooks indicate that he was interested in studying the works of agricultural chemists to critique international agricultural trade and natural resource exploitation under capitalism. In other works, including The Communist Manifesto, the Critique of the Gotha Programme, and The Eighteenth Brumaire of Louis Bonaparte, Marx asserts the revolutionary potential of the peasant class through a transfer into the proletariat. Mikhail Bakunin thought the lumpenproletariat was a revolutionary class, while Mao Zedong believed that it would be rural peasants, not urban workers, who would bring about the proletarian revolution.

At the beginning of the 20th century, many leftists advocated strong government intervention in the economy. In contrast, Left-libertarians, anarchists and libertarian socialists believe in a decentralised economy run by trade unions, workers' councils, cooperatives, municipalities and communes, opposing both state and private control of the economy, preferring social ownership and local control in which a nation of decentralised regions is united in a confederation.

Leftists continue to criticise the perceived exploitative nature of globalisation, the "race to the bottom" and unjust lay-offs and exploitation of workers. In the last quarter of the 20th century, the belief that the government (ruling in accordance with the interests of the people) ought to be directly involved in the day-to-day workings of an economy declined in popularity amongst the centre-left, especially social democrats who adopted the Third Way. From the 1990s, the global justice movement, also known as the anti-globalisation movement and the alter-globalisation movement, protests against corporate economic globalisation due to its negative consequences for the poor, workers, the environment, and small businesses.

=== Environment ===
One of the foremost left-wing advocates was Thomas Paine, one of the first individuals since left and right became political terms to describe the collective human ownership of the world, which he speaks of in Agrarian Justice. This principle is reflected in much of the historical left-wing thought and literature that came afterwards, although there were disagreements about what this entailed.

Karl Marx and the early socialist philosopher and scholar William Morris had a concern for environmental matters. According to Marx, "[e]ven an entire society, a nation, or all simultaneously existing societies taken together, are not the owners of the earth. They are simply its possessors, its beneficiaries, and have to bequeath it in an improved state to succeeding generations". Following the Russian Revolution, environmental scientists such as revolutionary Alexander Bogdanov and the Proletkult organisation made efforts to incorporate environmentalism into Bolshevism and "integrate production with natural laws and limits" in the first decade of Soviet rule, before Joseph Stalin attacked ecologists and the science of ecology, purged environmentalists and promoted the pseudoscience of Trofim Lysenko during his rule up until his death in 1953. Similarly, Mao Zedong rejected environmentalism and believed that based on the laws of historical materialism, all of nature must be put into the service of revolution.

From the 1970s onwards, environmentalism became an increasing concern of the left, with social movements and several unions campaigning on environmental issues and causes. In Australia, the left-wing Builders Labourers Federation, led by the communist Jack Mundy, united with environmentalists to place green bans on environmentally destructive development projects. Several segments of the socialist and Marxist left consciously merged environmentalism and anti-capitalism into an eco-socialist ideology. Barry Commoner articulated a left-wing response to The Limits to Growth model that predicted catastrophic resource depletion and spurred environmentalism, postulating that capitalist technologies were the key cause responsible for environmental degradation, as opposed to human population pressures. Environmental degradation can be seen as a class or equity issue, as environmental destruction disproportionately affects poorer communities and countries.

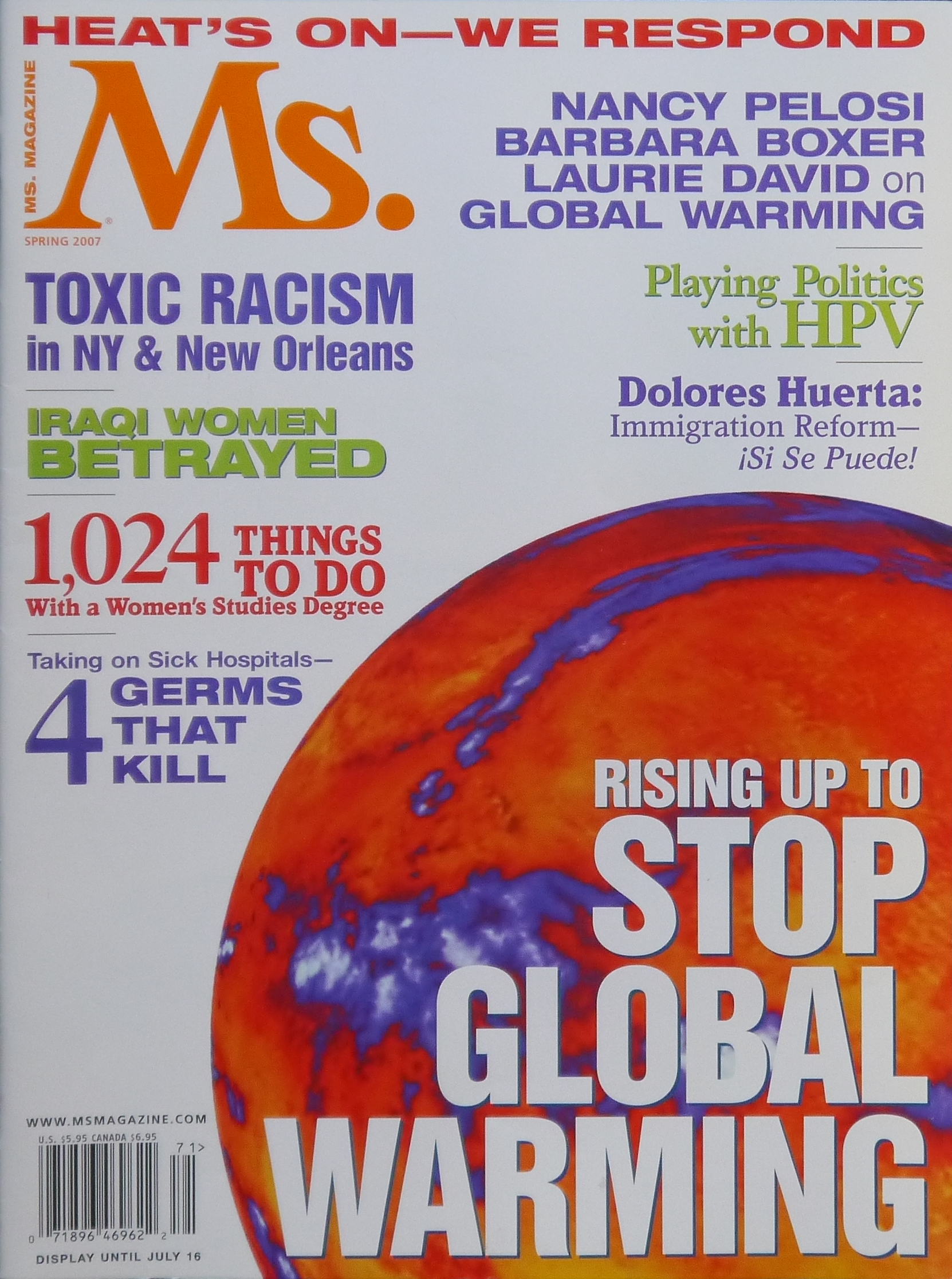
Global warming was the cover story of this 2007 issue of the Ms. magazine.

Several left-wing or socialist groupings have an overt environmental concern and several green parties contain a strong socialist presence. For example, the Green Party of England and Wales includes an eco-socialist group, the Green Left, founded in June 2005. In Europe, several green left political parties such as the European United Left–Nordic Green Left combine traditional social-democratic values such as a desire for greater economic equality and workers rights with demands for environmental protection. Democratic socialist Bolivian president Evo Morales has traced environmental degradation to capitalist consumerism, stating that "[t]he Earth does not have enough for the North to live better and better, but it does have enough for all of us to live well". Noam Chomsky and Naomi Klein are among those who hold similar views.

In climate change mitigation, the Left is also divided over how to effectively and equitably reduce carbon emissions as the center-left often advocates a reliance on market measures such as emissions trading and a carbon tax while those further to the left support direct government regulation and intervention in the form of a Green New Deal, either alongside or instead of market mechanisms.

=== Nationalism, anti-imperialism and anti-nationalism ===
The question of nationality, imperialism and nationalism has been a central feature of political debates on the Left. During the French Revolution, nationalism was a key policy of the Republican Left. The Republican Left advocated for civic nationalism and argued that the nation is a "daily plebiscite" formed by the subjective "will to live together". Related to revanchism, the belligerent will to take revenge against Germany and retake control of Alsace-Lorraine, nationalism was sometimes opposed to imperialism. In the 1880s, there was a debate between leftists such as the Radical Georges Clemenceau, the Socialist Jean Jaurès and the nationalist Maurice Barrès, who argued that colonialism diverted France from liberating the "blue line of the Vosges", in reference to Alsace-Lorraine; and the "colonial lobby" such as Jules Ferry of the Moderate Republicans, Léon Gambetta of the Republicans and Eugène Etienne, the president of the Parliamentary Colonial Group. After the antisemitic Dreyfus Affair in which officer Alfred Dreyfus was falsely convicted of sedition and exiled to a penal colony in 1894 before being exonerated in 1906, nationalism in the form of Boulangism increasingly became associated with the far-right.

The Marxist social class theory of proletarian internationalism asserts that members of the working class should act in solidarity with working people in other countries in pursuit of a common class interest, rather than only focusing on their own countries. Proletarian internationalism is summed up in the slogan: "Workers of the world, unite!", the last line of The Communist Manifesto. Union members had learned that more members meant more bargaining power. Taken to an international level, leftists argued that workers should act in solidarity with the international proletariat in order to further increase the power of the working class. Proletarian internationalism saw itself as a deterrent against war and international conflicts, because people with a common interest are less likely to take up arms against one another, instead focusing on fighting the bourgeoisie as the ruling class. According to Marxist theory, the antonym of proletarian internationalism is bourgeois nationalism. Some Marxists, together with others on the left, view nationalism, racism (including antisemitism) and religion as divide and conquer tactics used by the ruling classes to prevent the working class from uniting against them in solidarity with one another.

Anarchism has developed a critique of nationalism that focuses on nationalism's role in justifying and consolidating state power and domination. Through its unifying goal, nationalism strives for centralisation (both in specific territories and in a ruling elite of individuals) while it prepares a population for capitalist exploitation. Within anarchism, this subject has been extensively discussed by Rudolf Rocker in his book titled Nationalism and Culture and by the works of Fredy Perlman such as Against His-Story, Against Leviathan and The Continuing Appeal of Nationalism.

The failure of revolutions in Germany and Hungary in the 1918–1920 years ended Bolshevik hopes for an imminent world revolution and led to the promotion of the doctrine of socialism in one country by Joseph Stalin. In the first edition of his book titled Osnovy Leninizma (Foundations of Leninism, 1924), Stalin argued that revolution in one country is insufficient. By the end of that year in the second edition of the book, he argued that the "proletariat can and must build the socialist society in one country". In April 1925, Nikolai Bukharin elaborated on the issue in his brochure titled Can We Build Socialism in One Country in the Absence of the Victory of the West-European Proletariat?, whose position was adopted as state policy after Stalin's January 1926 article titled On the Issues of Leninism (К вопросам ленинизма) was published. This idea was opposed by Leon Trotsky and his supporters, who declared the need for an international "permanent revolution" and condemned Stalin for betraying the goals and ideals of the socialist revolution. Various Fourth Internationalist groups around the world who describe themselves as Trotskyist see themselves as standing in this tradition while Maoist China formally supported the theory of socialism in one country.

European social democrats strongly support Europeanism and supranational integration within the European Union, although there is a minority of nationalists and Eurosceptics on the left. Several scholars have linked this form of left-wing nationalism to the pressure generated by economic integration with other countries, often encouraged by neoliberal free trade agreements. This view is sometimes used to justify hostility towards supranational organisations.

Left-wing movements have often taken up anti-imperialist positions. Left-wing nationalism also can refer to any form of nationalism which emphasises a leftist working-class populist agenda that seeks to overcome exploitation or oppression by other nations. Many Third World anti-colonialist movements have adopted leftist and socialist ideas. Third-Worldism is a tendency within leftist thought that regards the division between First World and Second World developed countries and Third World developing countries as being of high political importance. This tendency supports decolonisation and national liberation movements against imperialism by capitalists. Third-Worldism is closely connected with African socialism, Latin American socialism, Maoism, pan-Africanism and pan-Arabism. Several left-wing groups in the developing world such as the Zapatista Army of National Liberation in Mexico, the Abahlali baseMjondolo in South Africa and the Naxalites in India have argued that the First World and the Second World Left takes a racist and paternalistic attitude towards liberation movements in the Third World.

=== Religion ===
The original French Left was firmly anti-clerical, strongly opposing the influence of the Roman Catholic Church and supporting atheism and the separation of church and state, ushering in a policy known as laïcité. Karl Marx asserted that "religion is the sigh of the oppressed creature, the heart of a heartless world, and the soul of soulless conditions. It is the opium of the people". In Soviet Russia, the Bolsheviks under Vladimir Lenin originally embraced an ideological principle which professed that all religion would eventually atrophy and resolved to eradicate organised Christianity and other religious institutions. In 1918, 10 Russian Orthodox hierarchs were summarily executed by a firing squad, and children were deprived of any religious education outside of the home.

Today in the Western world, those on the Left generally support secularisation and the separation of church and state. However, religious beliefs have also been associated with many left-wing movements such as the progressive movement, the Social Gospel movement, the civil rights movement, the anti-war movement, the anti-capital punishment movement and Liberation Theology. Early utopian socialist thinkers such as Robert Owen, Charles Fourier and the Comte de Saint-Simon based their theories of socialism upon Christian principles. Other common leftist concerns such as pacifism, social justice, racial equality, human rights and the rejection of capitalism and excessive wealth can be found in the Bible.

In the late 19th century, the Protestant Social Gospel movement arose in the United States which integrated progressive and socialist thought with Christianity through faith-based social activism. Other left-wing religious movements include Buddhist socialism, Jewish socialism and Islamic socialism. There have been alliances between the left and anti-war Muslims, such as the Respect Party and the Stop the War Coalition in Britain. In France, the left has been divided over moves to ban the hijab from schools, with some leftists supporting a ban based on the separation of church and state in accordance with the principle of laïcité and other leftists opposing the prohibition based on personal and religious freedom.

=== Social progressivism and counterculture ===
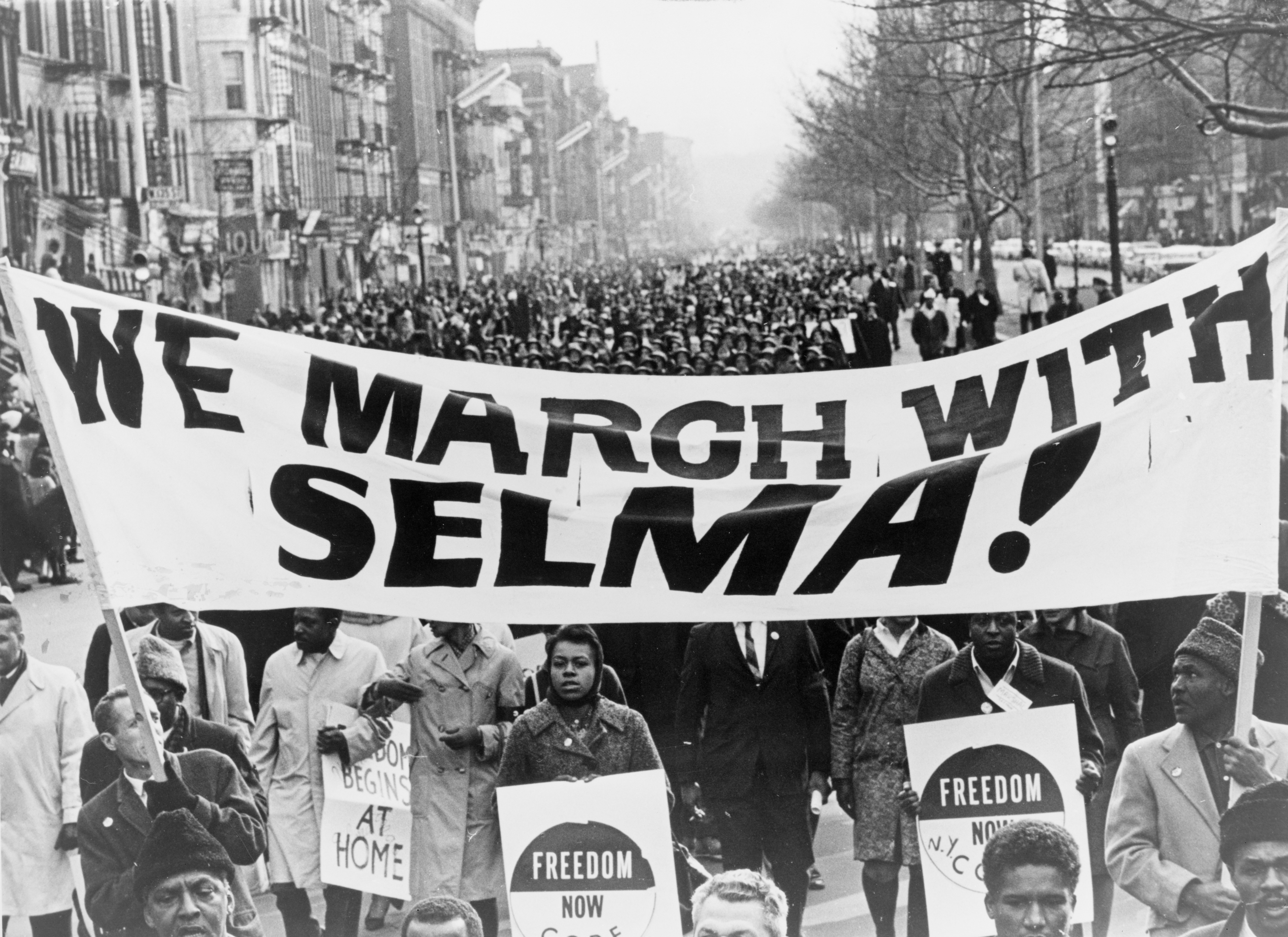
Protestors in Harlem, New York City, express solidarity with the Selma to Montgomery marches against racial segregation in the United States, 1965

Social progressivism is another common feature of modern leftism, particularly in the United States, where social progressives played an important role in the abolition of slavery, the enshrinement of women's suffrage in the United States Constitution, and the protection of civil rights, LGBTQ rights, women's rights and multiculturalism. Progressives have both advocated for alcohol prohibition legislation and worked towards its repeal in the mid to late 1920s and early 1930s. Current positions associated with social progressivism in the Western world include strong opposition to the death penalty, torture, mass surveillance, and the war on drugs, and support for abortion rights, cognitive liberty, LGBTQ rights including legal recognition of same-sex marriage, same-sex adoption of children, the right to change one's legal gender, distribution of contraceptives, and public funding of embryonic stem-cell research. The desire for an expansion of social and civil liberties often overlaps that of the libertarian movement. Public education was a subject of great interest to groundbreaking social progressives such as Lester Frank Ward and John Dewey, who believed that a democratic society and system of government was practically impossible without a universal and comprehensive nationwide system of education.

Various counterculture and anti-war movements in the 1960s and 1970s were associated with the New Left. Unlike the earlier leftist focus on labour union activism and a proletarian revolution, the New Left instead adopted a broader definition of political activism commonly called social activism. The New Left in the United States is associated with the hippie movement, mass protest movements on school campuses and a broadening of focus from protesting class-based oppression to include issues such as gender, race and sexual orientation. The British New Left was an intellectually driven movement which attempted to correct the perceived errors of the Old Left. The New Left opposed prevailing authoritarian structures in society which it designated as "The Establishment" and became known as the "Anti-Establishment". The New Left did not seek to recruit industrial workers en masse, but instead concentrated on a social activist approach to organization, convinced that they could be the source for a better kind of social revolution. This view has been criticised by several Marxists, especially Trotskyists, who characterised this approach as "substitutionism" which they described as a misguided and non-Marxist belief that other groups in society could "substitute" for and "replace" the revolutionary agency of the working class.

Many early feminists and advocates of women's rights were considered a part of the Left by their contemporaries. Feminist pioneer Mary Wollstonecraft was influenced by Thomas Paine. Many notable leftists have been strong supporters of gender equality such as Marxist philosophers and activists Rosa Luxemburg, Clara Zetkin and Alexandra Kollontai, anarchist philosophers and activists such as Virginia Bolten, Emma Goldman and Lucía Sánchez Saornil and democratic socialist philosophers and activists such as Helen Keller and Annie Besant. However, Marxists such as Rosa Luxemburg, Clara Zetkin, and Alexandra Kollontai, who are supporters of radical social equality for women and have rejected and opposed liberal feminism because they considered it to be a capitalist bourgeois ideology. Marxists were responsible for organising the first International Working Women's Day events.

The women's liberation movement is closely connected to the New Left and other new social movements which openly challenged the orthodoxies of the Old Left. Socialist feminism as exemplified by the Freedom Socialist Party and Radical Women and Marxist feminism, spearheaded by Selma James, saw themselves as a part of the Left that challenges male-dominated and sexist structures within the Left. The connection between left-wing ideologies and the struggle for LGBTQ rights also has an important history. Prominent socialists who were involved in early struggles for LGBTQ rights include Edward Carpenter, Oscar Wilde, Harry Hay, Bayard Rustin and Daniel Guérin, among others. The New Left is also strongly supportive of LGBTQ rights and liberation, having been instrumental in the founding of the LGBTQ rights movement in the aftermath of the Stonewall Riots of 1969. Contemporary leftist activists and socialist countries such as Cuba are actively supportive of LGBTQ+ people and are involved in the struggle for LGBTQ+ rights and equality.

== History ==
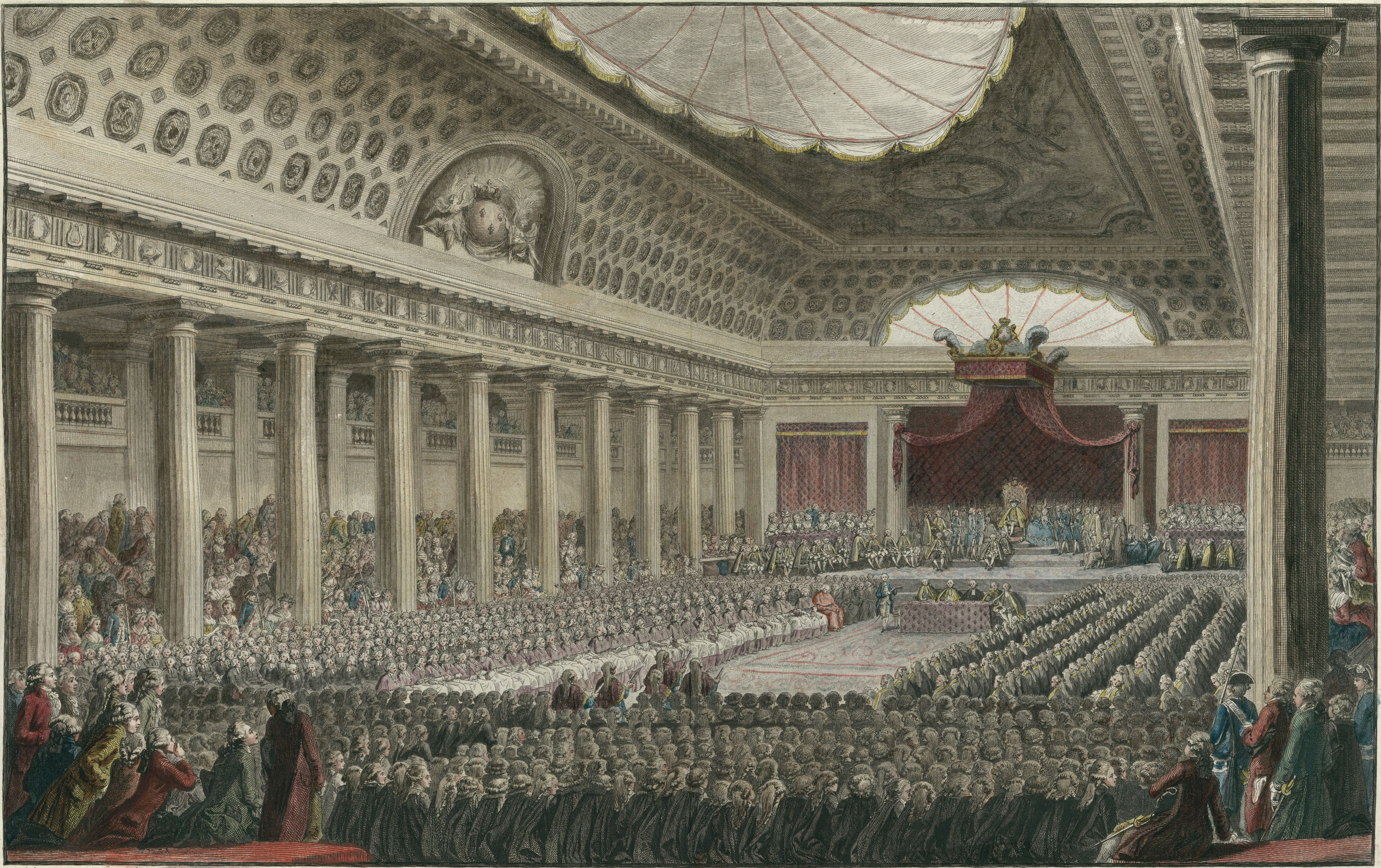
The 5 May 1789 opening of the Estates General of 1789 in Versailles

Throughout the 19th century, the main line dividing Left and Right was between supporters of the French republic and those of the monarchy's privileges. The June Days uprising during the Second Republic was an attempt by the Left to re-assert itself after the 1848 Revolution, but only a small portion of the population supported this.

In the mid-19th century, nationalism, socialism, democracy and anti-clericalism became key features of the French Left. After Napoleon III's 1851 coup and the subsequent establishment of the Second Empire, Marxism began to rival radical republicanism and utopian socialism as a force within left-wing politics. The influential Communist Manifesto by Karl Marx and Friedrich Engels, published amidst the wave of revolutions of 1848 across Europe, asserted that all of human history is defined by class struggle. They predicted that a proletarian revolution would eventually overthrow bourgeois capitalism and create a stateless, moneyless and classless communist society. It was in this period that the word wing was appended to both Left and Right.

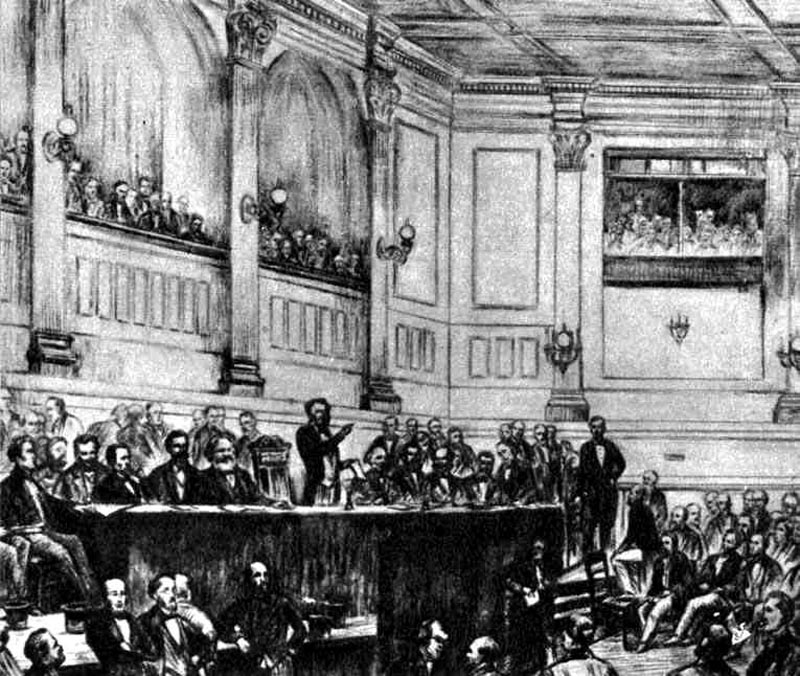
Depiction of the IWA's founding meeting at St Martin's Hall in London, 1864

The International Workingmen's Association (1864–1876), sometimes called the First International, brought together delegates from many different countries, with many different views about how to reach a classless and stateless society. Following a split between supporters of Marx and Mikhail Bakunin, anarchists formed the Saint-Imier International and later the International Workers' Association (IWA–AIT). The Second International (1888–1916) became divided over the issue of World War I. Those who opposed the war, among them Vladimir Lenin and Rosa Luxemburg, saw themselves as further to the left.

In the United States, leftists such as social liberals, progressives and trade unionists were influenced by the works of Thomas Paine, who introduced the concept of asset-based egalitarianism which theorises that social equality is possible by a redistribution of resources. After the Reconstruction era in the aftermath of the American Civil War, the phrase "the Left" was used to describe those who supported trade unions, the civil rights movement and the anti-war movement. More recently, left-wing and right-wing have often been used as synonyms for the Democratic and Republican parties, or as synonyms for liberalism and conservatism, respectively.

During the 20th century, war resulted in a dramatic intensification of the pace of social changes, and was a crucial catalyst for the growth of left-wing politics. Since the Right was populist, both in the Western and the Eastern Bloc, anything viewed as avant-garde art was called leftist across Europe, thus the identification of Picasso's Guernica as "leftist" in Europe and the condemnation of the Russian composer Shostakovich's opera (The Lady Macbeth of Mtsensk District) in Pravda as follows: "Here we have 'leftist' confusion instead of natural, human music".

== Types ==
The spectrum of left-wing politics ranges from centre-left to far-left. The term centre-left describes a position within the political mainstream that accepts capitalism and a market economy. The term far-left is used for positions that are more radical, strongly rejecting capitalism and mainstream representative democracy, instead advocating for a socialist society based on economic democracy and direct democracy, representing economic, political and social democracy. The centre-left includes social democrats, social liberals, progressives and greens. Centre-left supporters accept market allocation of resources in a mixed economy with an empowered public sector and a thriving private sector. Centre-left policies tend to favour limited state intervention in matters pertaining to the public interest.

In several countries, the terms far-left and radical left have been associated with many varieties of anarchism, autonomism and communism. They have been used to describe groups that advocate anti-capitalism and eco-terrorism. In France, a distinction is made between the centre-left and the left represented by the Socialist Party and the French Communist Party and the far-left as represented by anarcho-communists, Maoists and Trotskyists. The United States Department of Homeland Security defines "left-wing extremism" as groups that "seek to bring about change through violent revolution, rather than through established political processes". Similar to far-right politics, extreme far-left politics have motivated political violence, radicalisation, genocide, terrorism, sabotage and damage to property, the formation of militant organisations, political repression, conspiracism, xenophobia, and nationalism. In the past this has included groups such as Weather Underground, the Black Panther Party and the Black Liberation Army. Today groups like Antifa and the Turtle Island Liberation Front has been designated as terrorist organizations and charged for terrorist plots against the U.S. government.

In China, the term Chinese New Left denotes those who oppose the reform and opening up enacted by Deng Xiaoping in the 1980s and 1990s, favour instead the restoration of Maoist policies and the immediate transition to a socialist economy. In the Western world, the term New Left is used for social and cultural politics.

In the United Kingdom during the 1980s, the term hard left was applied to supporters of Tony Benn such as the Campaign Group and those involved in the London Labour Briefing newspaper as well as Trotskyist groups such as Militant and the Alliance for Workers' Liberty. In the same period, the term soft left was applied to supporters of the British Labour Party who were perceived to be more moderate and closer to the centre, accepting Keynesianism. Under the leadership of Tony Blair and Gordon Brown, the Labour Party adopted the Third Way and rebranded itself as New Labour in order to promote the notion that it was less left-wing than it had been in the past to accommodate the neoliberal trend arising since the 1970s with the displacement of Keynesianism and post-war social democracy. One of the first actions of Ed Miliband, the Labour Party leader who succeeded Blair and Brown, was the rejection of the New Labour label and a promise to abandon the Third Way and turn back to the left. However, Labour's voting record in the House of Commons from 2010 to 2015 indicated that the Labour Party under Miliband had maintained the same distance from the left as it did under Blair. In contrast, the election of Jeremy Corbyn as the Labour Party leader was viewed by scholars and political commentators as Labour turning back toward its more classical socialist roots, rejecting neoliberalism and the Third Way whilst supporting a democratic socialist society and an end to austerity measures.

== Criticism ==
There have been criticisms directed at the left regarding its stance on political pluralism, economic organization, and the concentration of state power. Some political movements that identify with the left, such as authoritarian communist states, have constrained political competition and civil liberties to advance political goals. Political psychologist Artur Nilsson warns against lumping authoritarianism and more generalized anti-democratic sentiment as one.

Another criticism is related to economic central planning. The main reason is that centralized systems tend to have problems when it comes to gathering information about economics and resource allocation. This was a main aspect of socialism calculation debate.

== See also ==
- Conflict theories
- Left-conservatism
- Left-wing populism
- Left-wing terrorism
- List of left-wing internationals
- List of left-wing political parties
- Post-left anarchy
- Red-baiting
- Red Scare
- Redwashing
- Right-wing politics
- Social criticism
- Woke

== Sources ==
- Kolko, Gabriel (1994). Anatomy of a War: Vietnam, the United States, and the Modern Historical Experience. New Press. ISBN 9781565842182.
