= Anarcho-Syndicalism: Theory and Practice =

Book by Rudolf Rocker

- Cover of the 1989 Pluto Press edition of Anarcho-Syndicalism
- Author: Rudolf Rocker
- Language: English
- Publisher: Secker & Warburg
- Publication date: 1938
- Publication place: London

Anarcho-Syndicalism: Theory and Practice is a 1938 book by the German anarchist Rudolf Rocker. The book serves as an introduction to anarcho-syndicalism, and as a history of anarchist ideas and the workers' movement in Europe. The book was written in the context of the ongoing Spanish Revolution, during which anarcho-syndicalist unions had collectivised significant parts of the economy.

The book was originally published by Secker & Warburg and written at the behest of Emma Goldman. The manuscript was written in German and translated into English by Ray E. Chase. A Spanish edition was translated by Diego Abad de Santillán in 1938. In 1947, an edition was published by Modern Publishers in India with a new epilogue by Rocker. Editions have also been published by AK Press, Gordon Press, Phoenix Press, Pluto Press, and PM Press, among others. Pluto Press and AK Press editions include a preface by Noam Chomsky and an introduction by Nicolas Walter.

== Reviews ==
In a contemporary review, Vernon Richards in Spain and the World praised the book, stating that "it is as well that the book is short, for by its brevity it succeeds more successfully in its aim: to briefly explain Anarcho-Syndicalism to the uninitiated… and the initiated". Herbert Read stated in The Criterion that the book is "short and polemical", arguing that it "is, in fact, historical rather than constructive, and it might have been more valuable if it had included a more precise account of syndicalist organization". While E. H. Carr, in The Times Literary Supplement described the book as an "earnest but somewhat heavily written little book", going on to criticise some of the historical analysis, and stating that the book is "much diminished" by historical exaggerations.

A 2006 review in Freedom, observed that, for a book "primarily about anarcho-syndicalism, Rocker spends rather a lot of time on a basic history, firstly of anarchist ideas and then on the workers movement in England, France and the rest of Europe." In 2012, Brian Morris in Anarchist Studies wrote that the book "is a classic of anarchist literature, and continues to be re-issued almost every decade", while in 2016, Shane Burley described the book in the Anarcho-Syndicalist Review as "the foundational text" for anarcho-syndicalism.

== Anarchism and Anarcho-Syndicalism ==
In 1946, Rocker wrote an abridged version of the book under the title Anarchism and Anarcho-Syndicalism, which was first published in 1948 in the Philosophical Library series European Ideologies. The book was later republished by Freedom Press.
