= Rose Witcop =

Anarchist and birth control activist (1890–1932)

- Born: Rachel Vitkopsk; 9 April 1890; Kiev, Kiev Governorate, Russian Empire
- Died: 4 July 1932 (aged 42); St George's Hospital, Metropolitan Borough of Wandsworth, London, England
- Occupation: Journalist
- Movement: Anarchist
- Spouse: Guy Aldred (m. 1926)
- Relatives: Milly Witkop (sister)

Rose Lilian Witcop Aldred (9 April 1890 – 4 July 1932) was an anarchist, journalist and pioneer of birth control and sex education. She was born Rachel Vitkopski in Kiev, Russian Empire to Jewish parents - Simon and Freda (née Grill) - who brought her to London, England when she was five years old.

== Life ==
Witcop was a member of the anarchist Jubilee Street Club - her sister Milly was the partner of Rudolf Rocker - and it was there she met Guy Aldred. In January 1907 they set up home together in Thorpebank Road, Shepherd's Bush, London. Two years later, on 2 May 1909, she gave birth to their son, Annesley.

Witcop worked alongside Aldred and single-handedly ran The Spur during his imprisonment for resisting conscription during the First World War. From 1921 she concentrated her efforts on the issue of birth control and in 1923 she and Aldred were arrested and charged for publishing and distributing Margaret Sanger's Family Limitation. The case drew much press coverage and was supported both morally and financially at appeal by Dora Russell and John Maynard Keynes. Although losing the case, Rose re-published the text in 1925 and, while she avoided prosecution, attracted the attention of the Home Office who threatened to deport her as a Russian (i.e. Soviet) national. Despite having parted in 1924, Witcop and Aldred arranged a civil marriage in order to confirm her citizenship status and prevent any possible deportation.

Witcop died on 4 July 1932 in St George's Hospital, London from gangrenous appendicitis and was cremated at Golders Green Crematorium two days later.

== Bibliography ==
- Aldred, Guy A. (1963), No Traitors' Gait! - The Life and Times of Guy A. Aldred, Vol.3 No.1, Strickland Press, Glasgow
- Caldwell, John T. (1978), "Guy Aldred, Anti-Parliamentarian, 1886-1963: A Memoir", Essays in Scottish Labour History: a tribute to W. H. Marwick, ed. MacDougall, I., ISBN 0-85976-039-1
- Caldwell, John Taylor (1988), Come Dungeons Dark: The Life and Times of Guy Aldred, Glasgow Anarchist, ISBN 0-946487-19-7
