= Milly Witkop =

Anarchist and feminist (1877–1955)

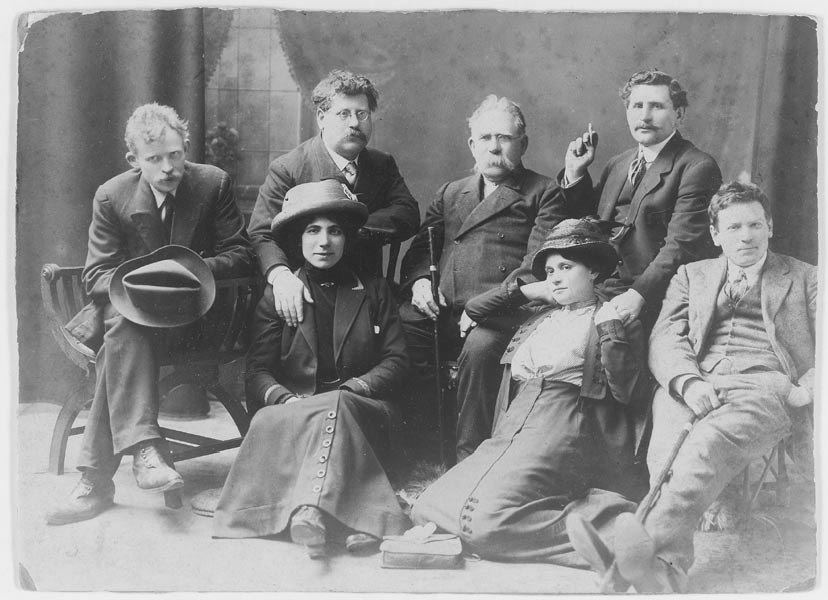
- Milly Witkop (front row, first from left to right) with Rudolph Rocker (behind her) and other London anarchists in 1912
- Born: March 3, 1877; Zlatopol, Russian Empire (now Ukraine)
- Died: November 23, 1955 (aged 78); Crompond, New York, United States
- Known for: Anarcho-syndicalist writings and activism
- Spouse: Rudolf Rocker
- Children: Fermin Rocker
- Relatives: Rose Witcop (sister)

Milly Witkop(-Rocker) (March 3, 1877 – November 23, 1955) was a Ukrainian-born Jewish anarcho-syndicalist, feminist writer and activist. She was the common-law wife of the prominent anarcho-syndicalist leader Rudolf Rocker. The couple's son, Fermin Rocker, was an artist.

== Early life and period in London ==
Witkop was born Vitkopski in the Ukrainian shtetl of Zlatopol to a Jewish Ukrainian-Russian family as the oldest of four sisters. The youngest of the four, Rose, also became a well-known anarchist. In 1894, Witkop left Ukraine for London. In the decades following the 1881 assassination of Czar Alexander II, many Jews left Russia, as a result of anti-Jewish pogroms throughout the Empire. Most went to the United Kingdom or the United States.

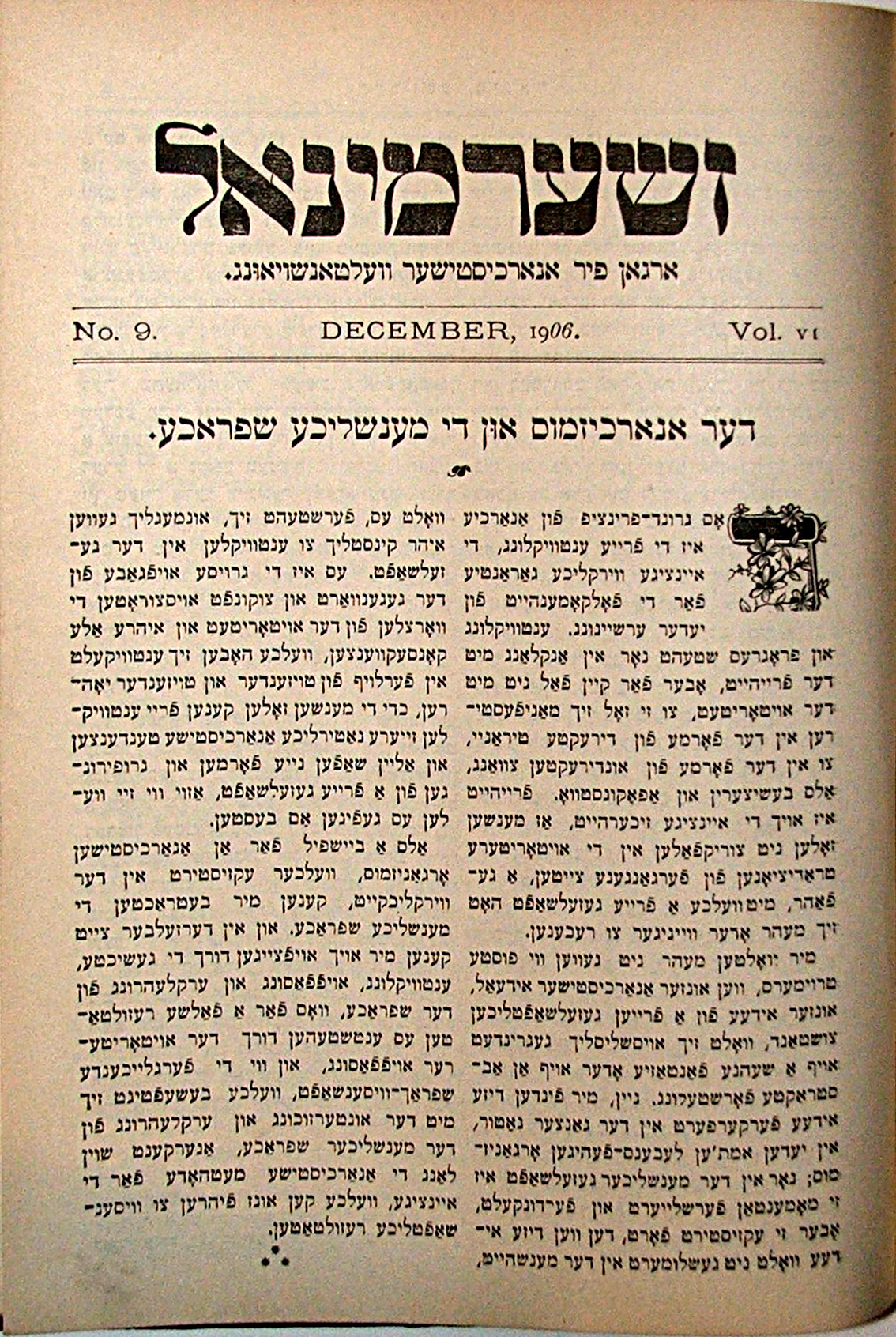
December 1906 edition of Germinal

In London, she worked in a tailoring sweatshop and saved enough money to finance her parents' and sisters' passage to England. The hard conditions she worked under led her to question her faith. Her involvement in a bakers' strike led her to become involved with the group around the Jewish anarchist newspaper Arbayter Fraynd. She became influenced by the works of the anarchist theorist Peter Kropotkin. In 1895, she first met Rudolf Rocker in the course of her political work. In May 1898, Rocker invited her to accompany him to New York City, where he hoped to find employment. The two were, however, not admitted to the country, because they refused to get married legally and were returned to the United Kingdom with the same ship on which they had reached the United States. The matter received some newspaper coverage in the United States at the time, attacking the couple's love without marriage.

From October 1898, Rocker and Witkop co-edited the Arbeyter Fraynd. In March 1900, the two also started publishing the newspaper Germinal, which was more focused on cultural topics. In 1907, the couple's son, Fermin, was born. Rocker and Witkop were opposed to World War I after it broke out in 1914, unlike many other anarchists such as Kropotkin, who supported the Allied cause. To ease the poverty and deprivation caused by the joblessness that accompanied the war, Witkop and her husband opened a soup kitchen. In December 1914, however, Rocker like many Germans and Austrians in the UK, was interned as an enemy alien. Witkop continued her anti-war activities until she was also arrested in 1916. She remained imprisoned until the autumn of 1918. She then left the United Kingdom to join her husband and son in the Netherlands.

== Germany ==
At first, the couple welcomed the February and October Revolutions in Russia, but after the Bolshevik coup they started criticizing the statism and totalitarianism of what would become the Soviet Union. In November 1918, they moved to Berlin; Rocker had been invited by Free Association of German Trade Unions (FVdG) chairman Fritz Kater to join him in building up what would become the Free Workers' Union of Germany (FAUD), an anarcho-syndicalist trade union. Both Rocker and Witkop became members of the FAUD.

After its founding in early 1919, a discussion about the role of girls and women in the union started. The male-dominated organization had at first ignored gender issues, but soon women started founding their own unions, which were organized parallel to the regular unions, but still formed part of the FAUD. Witkop was one of the leading founders of the Women's Union in Berlin in 1920. On October 15, 1921, the women's unions held a national congress in Düsseldorf and the Syndicalist Women's Union (SFB) was founded on a national level. Shortly thereafter, Witkop drafted Was will der Syndikalistische Frauenbund? (What Does the Syndicalist Women's Union Want?) as a platform for the SFB. From 1921, the Der Frauenbund was published as a supplement to the FAUD organ Der Syndikalist, Witkop was one of its primary writers.

Witkop reasoned that proletarian women were exploited not only by capitalism like male workers, but also by their male counterparts. She contended therefore that women must actively fight for their rights, much like workers must fight capitalism for theirs. She also insisted on the necessity of women taking part in class struggle. Housewives could use boycotts to support this struggle. From this, she concluded the necessity of an autonomous women's organization in the FAUD. Witkop also held that domestic work should be deemed equally valuable to wage labor. In a 1921 article in Der Frauenbund, Witkop argued that the most important issue facing the SFB was the "sexual issue". She called for access to birth control and advocated a childbearing strike. A debate on the issue within the German syndicalist movement ensued. Meetings on the issue were well-attended meetings and new SFB chapters were formed.

== United States ==
Witkop was not only active in the syndicalist and feminist movement, but also worked to fight racism and antisemitism. She was often frustrated by what she considered an unwillingness to fight antisemitism in the labor movement. The rise of the Nazi Party in Germany in the late 1920s greatly troubled Witkop. After the Reichstag fire in February 1933, Witkop and Rocker fled Germany for the United States via Switzerland, France, and the UK. In the US, the couple continued to give lectures and write about anarchist topics. During the Spanish Civil War from 1936 to 1939, they started an awareness campaign to educate Americans about the events in Spain. In Fall 1937, the two moved to the Mohegan Commune near Lake Mohegan in Crompond. After World War II broke out, Witkop, like her husband and other anarchists such as Max Nettlau and Diego Abad de Santillán, supported the Allies because she felt Nazism could not be defeated with pacifist means.

After World War II, Witkop had some sympathy for the Zionist movement, but was skeptical as to whether a nation state could solve the "Jewish question". She favored the idea of bi-nationality developed by Martin Buber and Ahad Ha'am. The Mohegan commune, especially Witkop, was active in sending material support to German anarchists. They sent several hundred packages to Germany.

Witkop died on November 23, 1955. She had been suffering from difficulties of breathing for months.
