= Paleoism =

Paleoism may refer to:

- Paleoconservatism, an anti-communist and anti-imperialist political philosophy in the United States
- Paleolibertarianism, a school of thought within American libertarianism with a strong emphasis on cultural conservatism

== See also ==
- Classical liberalism
- Liberalism
- Old Left
- Paleo (disambiguation)
