= Old Left =

Pre-1960s left-wing ideology in the Western world

The Old Left is an informal umbrella term used to describe the various left-wing political movements in the Western world prior to the 1960s and subsequent political movements inspired by these movements. Many of these movements were Marxist movements that often took a more vanguardist approach to social justice; focused primarily on labor unionization and social class in the West. Generally, Old Left movements, unlike the New Left, focused more on economic issues than cultural ones.

Unlike the New Left, the Old Left puts less emphasis on social issues such as identity politics, intersectionality, abortion, drugs, feminism, LGBT rights, environmentalism, immigration and the abolition of capital punishment; some Old Leftists outright oppose the New Left positions on these issues.

While some parties within the Old Left embraced gay rights, influenced by movements like Eurocommunism, others focused on advocating for the working class alone.

The emergence of the New Left, which initially originated in the UK, witnessed a shift away from the focus on class struggle and Marxist views of labor. New Left theorists like Herbert Marcuse emphasized the liberation of human sexuality rather than class struggle.

== Origins ==
The Old Left originated in the 19th century during the Industrial Revolution. At a time when few countries even had universal suffrage, the Old Left focused primarily on labor unions and social class. Their stances were economically left-wing, but largely ignored issues commonly linked to cultural liberalism.

Karl Marx and Friedrich Engels published The Communist Manifesto in 1848, during the Revolutions of 1848. They proposed the following policies: the abolition of private property in land and inheritance; introduction of a progressive income tax; confiscation of rebels' property; nationalization of credit, communication, and transport; expansion and integration of industry and agriculture; enforcement of universal obligation of labour; and provision of universal education and abolition of child labour. The text ends with three decisive sentences, reworked and popularized into the famous call for solidarity, the slogan "Workers of the world, unite! You have nothing to lose but your chains".

The first Communist state was the Soviet Union, led by Vladimir Lenin and the Bolsheviks.

== Social policy ==
Since the mid-1970s with the advent of revisionist movements such as Eurocommunism (and earlier in the Anglosphere, the New Left), some parties on the far left in the West have begun to adopt homosexual rights from the New Left as part of their platform while parties in the East such as the Communist Party of Greece (KKE) and the Communist Party of the Russian Federation have rejected this move and continue to focus exclusively on working class as the Old Left. In 2015, KKE voted against the Civil Partnerships Bill proposed by Syriza, responding: "With the formation of a socialist-communist society, a new type of partnership will undoubtedly be formed—a relatively stable heterosexual relationship and reproduction".

Militant was a Trotskyist entryist group in the British Labour Party, based around the Militant newspaper launched in 1964. According to Michael Crick, its politics were influenced by Karl Marx, Friedrich Engels, Vladimir Lenin and Leon Trotsky and "virtually nobody else". Militant has been cited as an example of left-wing opposition to feminism and gay rights initiatives within the labour movement in the early 1980s, specifically opposing the financial support given to gay rights groups by Ken Livingstone's Greater London Council. While Militant was present in Labour Party women's sections, claiming forty delegates attended the Labour Party women's conference in 1981, it opposed feminism which declared that men were the enemy, or the cause of women's oppression.

=== Immigration ===
The Old Left sometimes took a stance hostile to immigration, promoting policies that would preserve the ethnic homogeneity of the country. Australian Prime Minister John Curtin, who was part of the Australian Labor Party, reinforced the White Australia Policy and said the following in his defense: "This country shall remain forever the home of the descendants of those people who came here in peace in order to establish in the South Seas an outpost of the British race." Arthur Calwell, another Old Leftist who led the Australian Labor Party in the 1960s, strongly defended the White Australia policy and said the following: "I am proud of my white skin, just as a Chinese is proud of his yellow skin, a Japanese of his brown skin, and the Indians of their various hues from black to coffee-coloured. Anybody who is not proud of his race is not a man at all. And any man who tries to stigmatize the Australian community as racist because they want to preserve this country for the white race is doing our nation great harm ... I reject, in conscience, the idea that Australia should or ever can become a multi-racial society and survive." Left-wing Labor members perceived unrestricted immigration as a ploy by owners to drive down wages, resulting in the leadership of labor unions often being skeptical of expanded immigration.

As late as 2015, Bernie Sanders criticized open borders a "Koch brothers proposal", although he later switched to the more New Left position welcoming to immigration.

=== Homosexuality ===
Communist leaders and intellectuals took many different positions on LGBT rights issues. Marx and Engels wrote little on the subject; Marx in particular rarely commented on sexuality in general. Writing for Political Affairs, Norman Markowitz writes: "Here, to be frank, one finds from Marx a refusal to entertain the subject, and from Engels open hostility to the individuals involved". This is because in private Engels criticized male homosexuality and related it to ancient Greek pederasty, saying that "[the ancient Greeks] fell into the abominable practice of sodomy [Knabenliebe, meaning 'boy love" or pederasty] and degraded alike their gods and themselves with the myth of Ganymede". Engels also said that the pro-pederast movement "cannot fail to triumph. Guerre aux cons, paix aus trous-de-cul [war on the cunts, peace to the arse-holes] will now be the slogan". Engels also referred to Dr. Karl Boruttau as a Schwanzschwule ("gay prick") in private.

In fact, in the Soviet Union, male homosexuality was considered a crime after its re-criminalization during the Stalinist era (it had previously been decriminalised by the early soviet government), a law which would not be revoked until 1993 after the dissolution of the USSR.

The Encyclopedia of Homosexuality is unequivocal on Marx and Engels view of homosexuality, stating in volume 2: "There can be little doubt that, as far as they thought of the matter at all, Marx and Engels were personally homo-phobic, as shown by an acerbic 1869 exchange of letter on Jean-Baptiste von Schweitzer, a German socialist rival. Schweitzer had been arrested in a park on a morals charge and not only did Marx and Engels refuse to join a committee defending him, they resorted to the cheapest form of bathroom humor in their private comments about the affair".

In 1933, Joseph Stalin added Article 121 to the entire Soviet Union criminal code, which made male homosexuality a crime punishable by up to five years in prison with hard labor. The precise reason for Article 121 is in some dispute among historians. The few official government statements made about the law tended to confuse homosexuality with pedophilia and was tied up with a belief that homosexuality was only practiced among fascists or the aristocracy. The law remained intact until after the dissolution of the Soviet Union and was repealed in 1993. Gay men were sometimes denied membership or expelled from Communist parties across the globe during the 20th century as most Communist parties followed the social precedents set by the Soviet Union.

The Party of Socialists of the Republic of Moldova (PSRM) is a party which strongly opposes LGBT rights in Moldova and works with nationalist, right-wing and religious movements to counter the "promotion of vice spread with the help of the US in Moldova"; the Party of Communists of the Republic of Moldova (PCRM) holds similar positions. The Communist Party of the Russian Federation (KPRF) supported an anti-gay law in 2013. The Communist Party of Greece (KKE) voted against the introduction of same-sex civil unions in 2015, but has also criticized homophobia and discrimination in general.

== Emergence of the New Left ==
The New Left arose first among dissenting intellectuals and campus groups in the United Kingdom and later alongside campuses in the United States and in the Western bloc.

The German critical theorist Herbert Marcuse is referred to as the "Father of the New Left". Marcuse rejected the theory of class struggle and the Marxist concern with labor. According to Leszek Kołakowski, Marcuse argued that since "all questions of material existence have been solved, moral commands and prohibitions are no longer relevant". He regarded the realization of man's erotic nature as the true liberation of humanity, which inspired the utopias of Jerry Rubin and others.

Between 1943 and 1950, Marcuse worked in U.S. government service for the Office of Strategic Services (predecessor of the Central Intelligence Agency) and criticized the ideology of the Communist Party of the Soviet Union in the book Soviet Marxism: A Critical Analysis (1958). After his studies, in the 1960s and the 1970s he became known as the preeminent theorist of the New Left and the student movements of West Germany, France and the United States.

The CIA, through the Congress for Cultural Freedom, funded various cultural organizations and magazines affiliated with the New Left that championed anti-communist ideas and Western values.

== Modern parties described as Old Left ==
=== Albania ===
- Communist Party of Albania
- Communist Party of Albania 8 November

=== Belarus ===
- Belaya Rus
- Communist Party of Belarus
- Republican Party of Labour and Justice

=== Belgium ===
- Communist Party of Belgium

=== Bosnia and Herzegovina ===
- Alliance of Independent Social Democrats

=== Bulgaria ===
- Party of the Bulgarian Communists

=== Canada ===
- Communist Party of Canada (Marxist–Leninist)

=== Cyprus ===
- Progressive Party of Working People

=== Czech Republic ===
- Communist Party of Bohemia and Moravia

=== Denmark ===
- Social Democrats

=== France ===
- French Communist Party
- Pole of Communist Revival in France

=== Georgia ===
- Communist Party of Abkhazia
- Communist Party of Georgia
- Communist Party of South Ossetia

=== Germany ===
- Communist Party of Germany
- Marxist–Leninist Party of Germany
- Sahra Wagenknecht Alliance

=== Greece ===
- Communist Party of Greece
- PASOK – Movement for Change

=== Hungary ===
- Hungarian Workers' Party

=== Iran ===
- Islamic Labour Party
- NEDA Party

=== Ireland ===
- Aontú
- Workers' Party

=== Italy ===
- CARC Party
- Communist Party
- Fatherland and Constitution

=== Kyrgyzstan ===
- Party of Communists of Kyrgyzstan

=== Moldova ===
- Party of Communists of the Republic of Moldova
- Party of Socialists of the Republic of Moldova

=== Netherlands ===
- Socialist Party

=== Norway ===
- Communist Party of Norway

=== Poland ===
- Polish Communist Party

=== Portugal ===
- Portuguese Communist Party

=== Romania ===
- Romanian Socialist Party

=== Russia ===
- Communists of Russia
- Communist Party of the Russian Federation
- A Just Russia

=== Slovakia ===
- Communist Party of Slovakia
- Direction – Social Democracy

=== Spain ===
- Communist Party of the Peoples of Spain
- Workers' Front

=== Sweden ===
- Communist Party

=== Tajikstan ===
- Communist Party of Tajikistan
- Socialist Party of Tajikistan

=== United Kingdom ===
- Blue Labour
- Communist Party of Great Britain (Marxist–Leninist)
- Social Democratic Party
- Socialist Labour Party
- Workers Party of Britain

=== United States ===
- Socialist Labor Party of America

== See also ==
- Left-conservatism
- Class reductionism
- Left-wing populism
- New Left
- Old Right
- Paleoism
- Paleo-Marxism
