= Fermin Rocker =

British painter (1907–2004)

Fermin Rocker (22 December 1907 – 18 October 2004) was a British painter and book illustrator. He was the son of the anarcho-syndicalist theorist and activist Rudolf Rocker, a German, who had moved to London 1895, and Milly Witkop, a Ukrainian Jew, an anarchist and a feminist activist, who had fled to London in 1894.

== Biography ==
Rocker was born in Stepney, East London in 1907 and named after the Spanish anarchist and mayor of Cádiz Fermín Salvochea. During his youth, he got to know many prominent anarchists such as Errico Malatesta and Peter Kropotkin and often attended anarchist meetings with his father, a prominent activist, whom he fondly recalls in his 1998 memoir. Later he would also meet Augustin Souchy, Emma Goldman, Alexander Berkman, Erich Mühsam, Nestor Makhno, and Buenaventura Durruti. During this period he learned to draw, guided by his half-brother Rudolph, and exhibited a natural aptitude.

When World War I broke out, both his parents were interned as enemy aliens, along with many naturalised Germans and Russians, his father in 1914, his mother in 1916. In 1918, they were released and moved to the Netherlands, then rapidly to Berlin where his artistic practice developed. Fermin Rocker trained as a lithographer. His early works consisted of sketches, watercolours, and graphic work. He also started mixing in the artist milieu of Berlin.

In 1929, Rocker followed his father on a lecture tour in the United States. Contrary to his original plans, he remained in New York. After the Machtergreifung in 1933, his parents joined him there to live in a rural commune in New York State. He worked as draftsman, a cartoon animator, a commercial artist, and as a book illustrator. Among his employers was the Survey Graphic. In 1944, he had his first one-man exhibition in New York. His works would also be exhibited at the Brooklyn Museum of Art, the Whitney Museum, and the Chicago Art Institute. The Library of Congress bought some works of his. In 1946, he received a prize from the Philadelphia Print Club for his graphic works. In 1952, he married Ruth Robins, a dentist from California who he had met in New York. In the same year, his mother died; three years later his father followed.

In 1956, he visited the United Kingdom for the first time since 1929. His wife liked the continent so much that she returned to settle in England in 1970, Fermin following her in 1972, to escape the crime and expensive rents in New York, and because Rocker thought New York had become ugly. He and Ruth lived in Tufnell Park for the rest of their long lives. Rocker illustrated books for the Oxford University Press and did paintings on the side. Mick Jagger bought a painting for £4,000 from him depicting Basque refugees fleeing Franco's allies towards the French border.

Aside from his animation work, Rocker worked in the realist tradition, mostly landscape paintings with warm colors up to this point. His images were rarely overtly political and after his move to New York he had mostly concentrated on oil paintings of intimate everyday scenes. Once back in London, his style evolved. He started painting still lifes and even political paintings such as the one he sold to Jagger. His colour palette became darker and more melancholy.

Rocker's relationship to Anarchism was ambiguous. He was deterred by the endless feuds and factionalism within Anarchism and acknowledged that capitalism had raised the standard of living.

After Rocker turned 65, he quit illustrating and concentrated on painting instead. He had 13 solo exhibitions in the last twenty years of his life, mostly at Stephen Bartley Gallery, in Chelsea, London. In 1989, Ruth Rocker died and the same year he published an account of his childhood in London. Rocker died peacefully aged 96 on 18 October 2004.
