= Adam Kossoff =

British filmmaker and artist

Adam Kossoff is a British filmmaker and artist.

== Early life and education ==
Kossoff was born in London. He gained a degree in film and photography at the Polytechnic of Central London (now University of Westminster) in 1980. In 2008 he was awarded his PhD with the dissertation "On Terra Firma: Space, Place and the Moving Image", by the Royal College of Art.

== Career ==
Kossoff began his career working as a playwright, with plays performed by the Royal Shakespeare Company, Soho Theatre and at Edinburgh Festival Fringe.

Kossoff then worked in the film and TV industry for a number of years, writing and directing documentaries and drama films. He made several films for Channel 4 including East Enders Against the Grain (1988), on the representation of the East End of London in film, Arm in Arm Together (1989), about Anglo-Soviet relations and home front propaganda during World War II, and Turbulence (1992), starring Kelly Marcel and Cathy Tyson, that looked at the issue of family sexual abuse.

From 2004-2021, Kossoff was a reader in film in the School of Art at the University of Wolverhampton. He has written for various journals and edited books, mainly focusing on issues of praxis and technics in the work of Walter Benjamin and Bernard Stiegler.

Kossoff has made experimental and essayistic films that have been screened at galleries and international film festivals:

- Moscow Diary (2012), filmed on a mobile phone, retraced the footsteps of Walter Benjamin's 1926-27 Moscow Diary.
- Made in Wolverhampton (2012), narrated by Sean Foley, it explored the melancholic identity and the changing nature of place and space in an English post-industrial city.
- The Anarchist Rabbi (2015), narrated by Steven Berkoff, focused on the East End haunts of German-born anarchist Rudolf Rocker.
- One Or the Other (2017), an essay film looking issues around the homeland and the nation state in Israel and Palestine.
- Through the Bloody Mists of Time (2020), narrated by Esther Leslie, uses a slowed down 9.5 mm film film of the 1937 Paris Exhibition featuring an imaginary voice-over dialogue between Walter Benjamin and Humphrey Jennings.
- Jackals and Arabs (by Franz Kafka) (2022) narrated by Mohammad Bakri.
- In The Loop of History (2020), an archival essay, is concerned with nationhood and history as myth in Israel-Palestine.

== Selected filmography ==
- 2024 Walking Backwards
- 2022 Downstream
- 2022 Jackals and Arabs
- 2020 In The Loop of History
- 2019 Through The Bloody Mists Of Time
- 2017 One Or The Other
- 2015 The Anarchist Rabbi
- 2015 How They Hate Us
- 2014 Animal Architecture
- 2011 Made In Wolverhampton
- 2011 Moscow Diary
