= Nationalism and Culture =

1937 book by Rudolf Rocker

- Author: Rudolf Rocker
- Subject: Anarchist criticism of religion, statism, nationalism and centralism
- Genre: Non-fiction
- Publisher: Covici-Friede
- Publication date: 1937

Nationalism and Culture is a 1937 book by German anarcho-syndicalist writer Rudolf Rocker. In this book, he criticizes religion, statism, nationalism, and centralism from an anarchist perspective.

== Background ==
The ideas expressed in the book, Rocker claimed, dated back to the time before World War I, when he was a leader in the Jewish anarchist labor movement in London. Over the years, many parts of Nationalism and Culture were published in various essays and lectures. Rocker started working on the book around 1925, while he was still living in Germany. At first, he only planned a short book on nationalism, but over the years the material grew. At the time, Rocker was becoming increasingly disillusioned as a wave of nationalism spread about Germany. This development culminated when the Nazi Party under Hitler came to power in 1933. Meanwhile, the German anarchist movement and the Free Workers' Union of Germany (FAUD), an anarcho-syndicalist trade union Rocker was active in, were waning. This led Rocker to even question whether Germans were at all capable of anarchist thought.

== Content ==
=== Part I ===
Rocker begins the first part of Nationalism and Culture with a chapter attacking the Insufficiency of Economic Materialism as it was called. Rocker maintained that there is a distinct difference between natural science and the humanities. While the former was concerned with "a causality of physical necessity", the latter with "a matter of a causality of human aims and ends". He criticizes Marxism for attempting to describe human interactions with scientific terms thus neglecting the will to power, a term borrowed from Friedrich Nietzsche, as a motor for historical development.

The book continues by describing the emergence and development of religion. Rocker claims religion to enslave its very creator, man, since man submits himself to a mysterious power over which he has no control. He also applies this criticism to modern-day politics. According to Nationalism and Culture, man is submitted to an all-powerful state just as he is to an all-powerful god. "Thus", Rocker claims, "we arrive at the very foundations of every system of rulership and recognize that all politics is in the last instance religion, and as such tries to hold the spirit of man in the chains of dependence." He adds that nationalism is the ideology, which justifies man's coercion by the state, pointing to the philosopher Jean-Jacques Rousseau, whose ideas greatly influenced the nationalist ideology. According to Rousseau, the citizen's freedom presupposes his submission under the common good embodied by the state. The state claims to be the creator of culture, when in truth, according to Nationalism and Culture, it is quite the opposite. The Renaissance is considered a mixed blessing, because on the one hand it was a period of high cultural productivity, but on the other hand the basis of the modern state. Similarly, Rocker gives Protestant Reformation the credit of having liberated the individual from the Catholic Church, but accuses it of having subdued it under the absolutist state. In his analysis of the Age of Enlightenment, Rocker distinguishes between liberal and democratic ideals. Liberalism reduced government to the night watchman state and thus contributed to individual liberty, while democracy is based on the general will and the collective rather than the individual and is therefore no more than a new form of despotism. This dichotomy between authoritarian democratic and libertarian ideas can also be seen in the history of the socialist movement, Rocker claims. While in Germany, Hegelian Marxism, which Rocker considers to be authoritarian, dominated the movement, the French socialists were influenced by the more liberal Proudhon. The consequence of Marx's authoritarian socialism is the Soviet regime, a twin evil of fascism, according to Rudolf Rocker.

=== Part II ===
The second part of Nationalism and Culture begins by refuting the various justifications for the nation: namely, the nation as a community of ideals, as a community of language, and as a racial collective. He concludes: "The nation is not the cause, but the result, of the state", it is not a natural institution but trained unto man much like a religion: "one is a German, a Frenchman, an Italian, just as one is a Catholic, a Protestant, or a Jew." The book proceeds by championing the idea that power is essentially detrimental to cultural development and Ancient Greece is cited as one of many examples for this. One chapter is devoted to architecture, as the "most social of all arts". Rocker concludes by pointing to the rise of new dictatorships, Nazism and Soviet communism, which take the place of people's unconditional trust in the infallibility of the Church. This trust leads them to support the "rape of all human rights". Against this authoritarianism, Rocker advocates a "new humanitarian socialism".

== Publication and reception ==
Nationalism and Culture was originally supposed to be published in Germany in 1933, but the Machtergreifung and Rocker's emigration intervened. It was not published until 1937, by the Spanish anarchist Diego Abad de Santillán and the publishing house Tierra y Libertad. Soon after the release, however, the Spanish Civil War made the book hard to sell. Alexander Berkman, one of Rocker's friends and also a well-known anarchist, started an English translation. Rocker, however, was unhappy with Berkman's work. With the help of anarchists he had met on a lecture tour in the United States, Rocker contacted Ray E. Chase, a professor at the University of California, who agreed to translate the book. This translation was published by the Rocker Publication Committee, which had been formed for this purpose, and the Covici-Friede publishing house in New York City, despite Emma Goldman having warned Rocker of Covici-Friede's bad reputation. Rocker's bad luck continued and the publishing house declared bankruptcy just a year after Nationalism and Culture was released. Nevertheless, the book was soon translated into Dutch, Swedish, Portuguese, French, and Japanese. It could not be published in Rocker's native Germany until 1949, after the end of World War II. There it was published under the title Die Entscheidung des Abendlandes (The Decision of the West).

Nationalism and Culture was received very well in the anarchist movement. Many compared Rocker to the likes of Proudhon, Bakunin, and Kropotkin to underline the work's importance for anarchism. Augustin Souchy claimed Rocker deserved the Nobel Peace Prize for the book. It has some influence to this day. For example, Noam Chomsky was greatly influenced by Rocker and Nationalism and Culture in particular. In the socialist spectrum, the book was lauded by Willi Eichler's magazine Geist und Tat and F. A. Ridley of the Socialist Leader. Lewis Mumford also expressed admiration for the book. The English socialist philosopher Bertrand Russell considered Nationalism and Culture an important contribution to political philosophy.

Both Albert Einstein and Thomas Mann, despite disagreeing with Rocker on many points, considered the book significant and wished it be read by as many people as possible. Solomon F. Bloom, reviewing the book in The New Republic considered the book "a most welcome contribution" and conceded that Rocker "supports his position with a wealth of information of encyclopedic range", but criticized that "[c]rucial concepts such as will, nation and religion are inadequately defined". Hans Rothfels in the American Historical Review criticized that "[o]bvious misstatements and misinterpretations are not infrequent", but called it "a combative book, but [...] not one of rattling bones nor a mere rehash of enlightened misconceptions about dark ages or the great impostors" and attributed "a wealth of information not easily accessible, and a sharply focused insight into cultural dynamics, which too often has been obscured by conventional theories of progress or of an organic or any other sort of determinism" to it. The American Sociological Review's recension is largely positive: "The book gives the historical and philosophical description of the problem. Its solution is still a challenge to the future", the reviewer C. R. Hoffer claims. The American sociologist Pitirim Sorokin, although he disagreed with Rocker's condemnation of the state, conceded that Nationalism and Culture included some interesting ideas. T. S. Eliot's The Criterion compared Nationalism and Culture to Oswald Spengler's The Decline of the West. Rocker and Spengler agreed in that there are no "eternal truths" and both considered there to be an antagonism between culture and power. While Rocker affirmed the former, Spengler considered the Roman Empire's imperial power a model for modern society. Nationalism and Culture became one of very few anarchist works to be used by university professors; several American professors had students read it for discussions about nationalism.

== Bibliography ==
- Barsky, Robert (1999). "Noam Chomsky and the Law". Archived from the original on December 14, 2007.
- Bloom, Solomon F. (September 22, 1937). "The Dilemma of Anarchism". The New Republic. Winnipeg: CanWest Global Communications. pp. 192–193. ISSN 0028-6583. OCLC 1759945.
- Hoffer, C. R.; Rocker, Rudolf (February 1938). "Review: Nationalism and Culture. by Rudolf Rocker". American Sociological Review. 3 (1). Menasha, Wisconsin: American Sociological Association: 103–104. doi:10.2307/2083516. JSTOR 2083516. OCLC 1480848.
- Reichert, William O. (1976). Partisans of Freedom: A Study in American Anarchism. Bowling Green, Ohio: Bowling Green University Popular Press. ISBN 0-87972-118-9.
- Rothfels, Hans (July 1951). "Review: Die Entscheidung des Abendlandes by Rudolf Rocker". American Historical Review. 56 (4). Washington: American Historical Association: 839–841. doi:10.2307/1851988. ISSN 0002-8762. JSTOR 1851988. OCLC 1830326.
- Vallance, Margaret (July 1973). "Rudolf Rocker—a biographical sketch". Journal of Contemporary History. 8 (3). London/Beverly Hills: Sage Publications: 75–95. doi:10.1177/002200947300800304. OCLC 49976309. S2CID 159569041.
- Wienand, Peter (1981). Der "geborene" Rebell: Rudolf Rocker - Leben und Werk (in German). Berlin: Karin Kramer Verlag. ISBN 3-87956-106-0.
