= Paleo =

Paleo may refer to:

== Prehistoric Era, Age, or Period ==
- Paleolithic, a prehistoric Era, Age, or Period of human history

== People ==
- David Strackany, aka "Paleo", an American folk singer-songwriter

== Art, entertainment, and media ==
- Paleo (Buffy novel), a 2000 novel based on Buffy the Vampire Slayer
- Paléo Festival, an annual rock festival held in Nyon, Switzerland
- Paleo, a magazine published by Outside (company)

== Diet ==
- Paleolithic diet

== Political philosophy ==
- Paleoconservatism, a type of American conservatism
- Paleolibertarianism, a type of American libertarianism

== See also ==
- Palaio (disambiguation) modern Greek spelling of Paleo
- Paleontology
- Prehistoric
