= Pioneers of American Freedom =

1949 book by Rudolf Rocker

Pioneers of American Freedom: Origin of Liberal and Radical Thought in America
- First edition
- Author: Rudolf Rocker
- Translator: Arthur E. Briggs
- Language: English
- Subject: History of liberal, libertarian, and anarchist thought in the United States
- Genre: non-fiction
- Publisher: Rocker Publishing Committee
- Publication date: 1949
- Publication place: United States

Pioneers of American Freedom: Origin of Liberal and Radical Thought in America is a book by Rudolf Rocker, a German anarcho-syndicalist, about the history of liberal, libertarian, and anarchist thought in the United States.

== Background ==
Rocker started work on Pioneers of American Freedom during World War II. Professor Arthur E. Briggs started translating the book into English from Rocker's native German in 1941. He took over for Rocker's previous English translator Ray E. Chase as he had died. The book was published with the help of the Rocker Publishing Committee in 1949.

== Contents ==
The first part of the book consists of a series of essays on the American liberal thinkers Thomas Paine, Thomas Jefferson, Ralph Waldo Emerson, Henry David Thoreau, William Lloyd Garrison, Wendell Phillips, and Abraham Lincoln. Rocker emphasizes the importance these men assign to individualism, freedom, and the subordination of the state to the welfare of the individual. This, Rocker claims, is a great similarity between anarchist and liberal thought.

The second part deals with American anarchists. Among those covered in the book are Josiah Warren, Stephen Pearl Andrews, Lysander Spooner, William Batchelder Greene, Ezra Heywood, and Benjamin Tucker. Rocker argues that these anarchists' emphasis on "free competition of individual and social forces as something inherent in human nature, which if suppressed will inevitably lead to the destruction of the social equilibrium" distinguishes them from authoritarian socialists. He claims that the problem in modern society is not too much competition, but a lack of it as the result of "the destructive forces of monopoly". Further, Rocker seeks to dispel the myth that radicalism in the United States was merely a foreign import, pointing to the fact that most of the thinkers covered by the book were undoubtedly American by descent and born in the New England states. In fact, he argues, they were active "before any modern radical movements were even thought of in Europe" and they were more influenced by the American Declaration of Independence than by any European thinker.

== Reception ==
Roger Nash Baldwin, co-founder of the American Civil Liberties Union, said of Pioneers of American Freedom: "No American has been able to write such an analysis of our heretics and idealists." The Mississippi Valley Historical Review claimed the essays made no new contribution and considered the discussion of Lincoln inferior. The journal's review does, however, credit Rocker with "bringing together in an orderly discussion of all the important American material on philosophical anarchism before World War I". Joseph Dorfman, in his review in the Journal of Political Economy, credits Rocker with writing one of the first treatments of American radical history, considering it a "welcome supplement" to Eunice M. Schuster's Native American Anarchism.
