= Rudolf Rocker =

German anarchist (1873–1958)

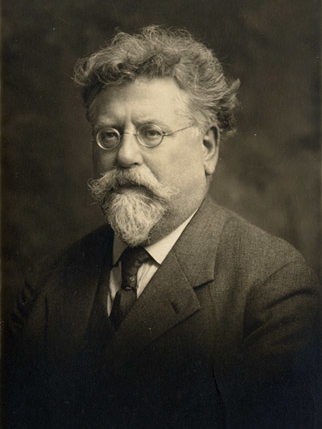
- Rocker c. 1930
- Born: Johann Rudolf Rocker; March 25, 1873; Mainz, Grand Duchy of Hesse, German Empire
- Died: September 19, 1958 (aged 85); Mohegan Colony, New York, U.S.
- Notable work: Nationalism and Culture; Pioneers of American Freedom
- Political party: Social Democratic Party (Note: It is unknown when he joined and when he left.)
- Spouse: Milly Witkop
- Children: Fermin Rocker
- Parent(s): Georg Philipp Rocker; Ann Naumann

Johann Rudolf Rocker (German: [ˈʁɔkɐ]; March 25, 1873 – September 19, 1958) was a German anarchist writer and activist. He was born in Mainz to an artisan family.

His father died when he was a child, and his mother when he was in his teens, so he spent some time in an orphanage. As a youth he worked as a cabin boy on river boats and was then apprenticed as a typographer. He became involved in trade unionism and joined the Social Democratic Party of Germany (SPD) before coming under the influence of anarchists such as Mikhail Bakunin and Peter Kropotkin. With other libertarian socialist youth, he was expelled from the SPD, and his anarchist activism led to him fleeing Germany for Paris, where he came into contact with syndicalist and anarchist ideas and practices. In 1895, he moved to London. Apart from brief spells in Liverpool and elsewhere, he remained in East London for most of the next two decades, acting a key figure in the Yiddish-language anarchist scene there, including editing the Arbeter Fraynd periodical, publishing the key thinkers of anarchism, and organising strikes in the garment industry. In London, he formed a life partnership with Milly Witkop, a Ukraine-born anarchist from a Jewish background. During World War I, he was interned as an enemy alien and at the end of the war he was deported to the Netherlands.

In the 1920s, he was mainly based in Germany, where he was one of the architects of the syndicalist Free Workers' Union of Germany (FAUD) and its organ Der Syndikalist and a founder of the International Workers' Association (IWA). He became increasingly concerned with the rise of nationalism and fascism (he began work on his magnum opus Nationalism and Culture in this period) and left Germany in 1933 for the United States. In the US, he was active with the Yiddish Freie Arbeiter Stimme group, and was particularly involved in libertarian education and in solidarity with the Spanish Revolution against its fascist and Stalinist enemies. His classics Nationalism and Culture and Anarcho-Syndicalism were published in the 1930s. Having opposed both sides in First World War, as an anti-fascist he supported the Allies in the Second World War. After the war, he published Pioneers of American Freedom, a series of essays detailing the history of liberal and anarchist thought in the United States, seeking to debunk the idea that radical thought was foreign to American history and culture and had merely been imported by immigrants.

== Early life ==
Rudolf Rocker was born to the lithographer Georg Philipp Rocker (1845–1877) and his wife Anna Margaretha née Naumann (1849–1887, daughter of Heinrich Naumann) as one of their four children, in Mainz, Hesse (now Rhineland-Palatinate), Germany, on March 25, 1873. (His siblings were Philipp, 1870–1873; Catharina Barbara, 20 March 1870 – 3 April 1870; and Friedrich, b. 1877). This Catholic, yet not particularly devout, family had a democratic and anti-Prussian tradition dating back to Rocker's grandfather, who participated in the March Revolution of 1848. When Georg Philipp died in 1877, just four years after Rocker's birth, the family managed to evade poverty primarily through the massive support by his mother's family.

In October 1884, the Rocker household was joined by his mother's new husband Ludwig Baumgartner. This marriage presented Rudolf with a half-brother, Ernest Ludwig Heinrich Baumgartner, with whom Rocker did not maintain close contact. Rocker's mother died in February 1887. After his stepfather remarried soon thereafter, Rocker was put into an orphanage.

Rudolf Rocker, disgusted by the unconditional obedience demanded by the Catholic orphanage and drawn by the prospect of adventure, ran away from the orphanage twice. The first time he just wandered around in the woods around Mainz with occasional visits to the city to forage for food and was retrieved after three nights. The second time, which was at the age of fourteen and a reaction to the orphanage wanting him to be apprenticed as a tinsmith, he worked as a cabin-boy for Köln-Düsseldorfer Dampfschiffahrtsgesellschaft. He enjoyed leaving his hometown and traveling to places like Rotterdam. After he returned, he started an apprenticeship to become a typographer like his uncle Carl.

== Early politics ==
Rocker's uncle, Carl Rudolf Naumann, had a substantial library consisting of socialist literature of all colors. Rocker was particularly impressed by the writings of Constantin Frantz, a federalist and opponent of Bismarck's centralized German Empire; Eugen Dühring, an anti-Marxist socialist, whose theories had some anarchist aspects; novels like Victor Hugo's Les Misérables and Edward Bellamy's Looking Backward; as well as the traditional socialist literature such as Karl Marx's Capital and Ferdinand Lasalle and August Bebel's writings. Rocker became a socialist and regularly discussed his ideas with others. His employer became the first person he converted to socialism.

Under the influence of his uncle, he joined the SPD and became active in the typographers' labor union in Mainz. He volunteered in the 1890 electoral campaign, which had to be organized in semi-clandestinity because of continuing government repression, helping the SPD candidate Franz Jöst retake the seat for the district Mainz-Oppenheim in the Reichstag. Because the seat was heavily contested, important SPD figures like August Bebel, Wilhelm Liebknecht, Georg von Vollmar, and Paul Singer visited the town to help Jöst and Rocker had a chance to see them speak.

In 1890, there was a major debate in the SPD about the tactics it would choose after the lifting of the Anti-Socialist Laws. A radical oppositional wing known as Die Jungen (The Young Ones) developed. While the party leaders viewed the parliament as a means of social change, Die Jungen thought it could at best be used to spread the socialist message. Unwilling to wait for the collapse of capitalist society which Marxism predicted, they wanted to start a revolution as soon as possible. Although this wing was strongest in Berlin, Magdeburg, and Dresden, it also had a few adherents in Mainz, among them Rudolf Rocker.

In May 1890, he started a reading circle, named Freiheit (Freedom), to study theoretical topics more intensively. After Rocker criticized Jöst and refused to retract his statements, he was expelled from the party. Nonetheless, he remained active and even gained influence in the socialist labor movement in Mainz. Although he had already encountered anarchist ideas as a result of his contacts to Die Jungen in Berlin, his conversion to anarchism did not take place until the International Socialist Congress in Brussels in August 1891. He was heavily disappointed by the discussions at the congress, as it, especially the German delegates, refused to explicitly denounce militarism. He was rather impressed by the Dutch socialist and later anarchist Ferdinand Domela Nieuwenhuis, who attacked Liebknecht for his lack of militancy. Rocker got to know Karl Höfer, a German active in smuggling anarchist literature from Belgium to Germany. Höfer gave him Mikhail Bakunin's God and the State and Peter Kropotkin's Anarchist Morality, two of the most influential anarchist works, as well as the newspaper Autonomie.

Rocker maintained that political rights originated towards the individual, rather than government as the collective that maintained personal freedoms. This view would later influence him into becoming an anarchist. Rudolf wrote on political rights:

Political rights do not originate in parliaments; they are, rather, forced upon parliaments from without. And even their enactment into law has for a long time been no guarantee of their security. Just as the employers always try to nullify every concession they had made to labor as soon as opportunity offered, as soon as any signs of weakness were observable in the workers' organizations, so governments also are always inclined to restrict or to abrogate completely rights and freedoms that have been achieved if they imagine that the people will put up no resistance. Even in those countries where such things as freedom of the press, right of assembly, right of combination, and the like have long existed, governments are constantly trying to restrict those rights or to reinterpret them by juridical hair-splitting. Political rights do not exist because they have been legally set down on a piece of paper, but only when they have become the ingrown habit of a people, and when any attempt to impair them will meet with the violent resistance of the populace. Where this is not the case, there is no help in any parliamentary Opposition or any Platonic appeals to the constitution.

— Rudolf Rocker, Anarcho-Syndicalism: Theory & Practice, 1947

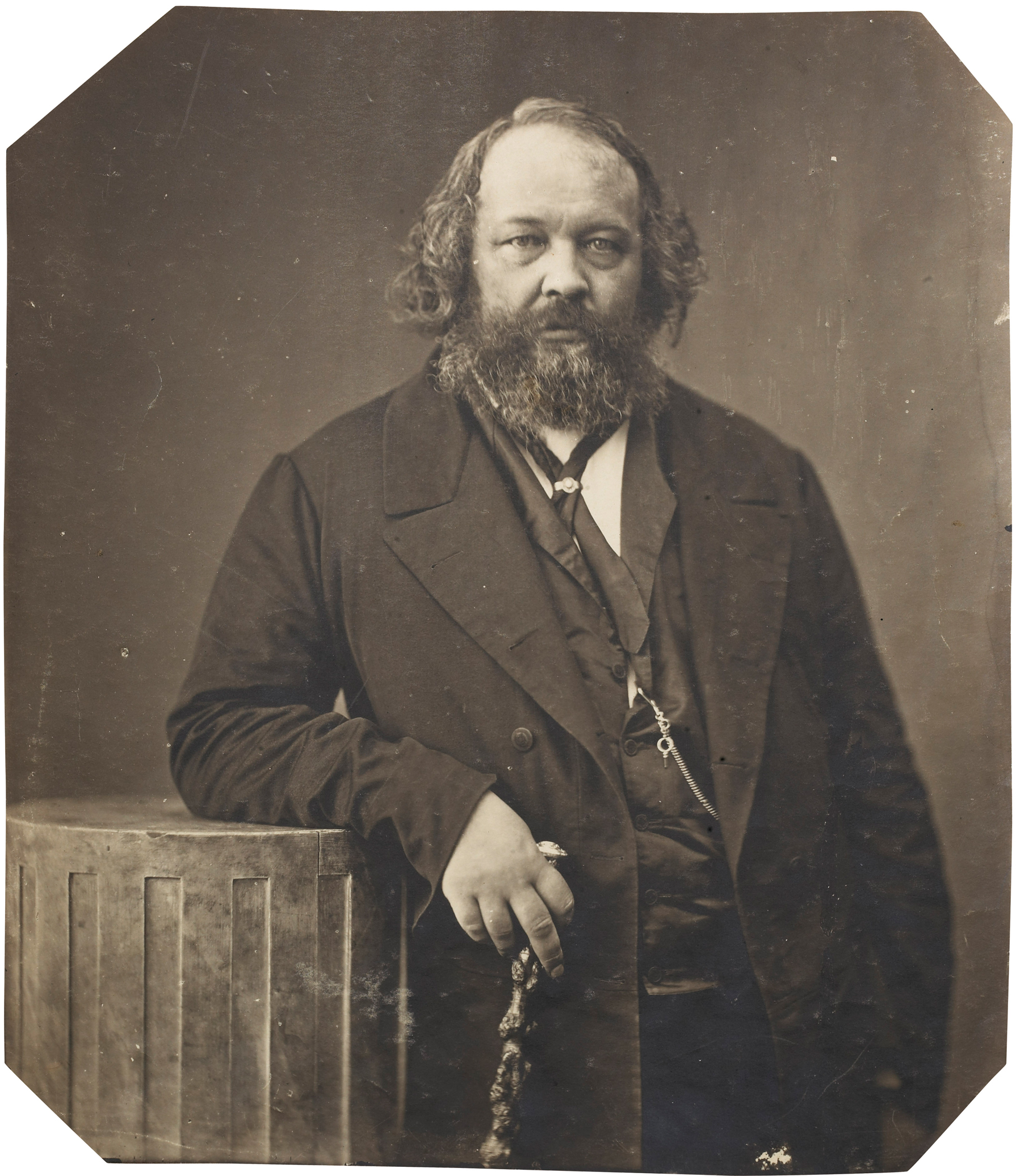
Mikhail Bakunin

Rocker became convinced that the source of political institutions is an irrational belief in a higher authority, as Bakunin claimed in God and the State. However, Rocker rejected the Russian's rejection of theoretical propaganda and his claim that only revolutions can bring about change. Nevertheless, he was very much attracted by Bakunin's style, marked by pathos, emotion, and enthusiasm, designed to give the reader an impression of the heat of revolutionary moments. Rocker even attempted to emulate this style in his speeches, but was not very convincing. Kropotkin's anarcho-communist writings, on the other hand, were structured logically and contained an elaborate description of the future anarchist society. The work's basic premise, that an individual is entitled to receive the basic means of living from the community independently of his or her personal contributions, impressed Rocker.

In October 1891, all Die Jungen were either expelled from the SPD or left voluntarily. They then founded the Union of Independent Socialists (VUS). Rocker became a member and founded a local section in Mainz, mostly active in distributing anarchist literature smuggled in from Belgium or the Netherlands in the city. He was a regular speaker at labor union meetings. On December 18, 1892, he spoke at a meeting of unemployed workers. Impressed by Rocker's speech, the speaker that followed Rocker, who was not from Mainz and therefore did not know at what point the police would intervene, advised the unemployed to take from the rich, rather than starve. The meeting was then dissolved by the police. The speaker was arrested, while Rocker barely escaped. He decided to flee Germany to Paris via Frankfurt. He had, however, already been toying with the idea of leaving the country, in order to learn new languages, get to know anarchist groups abroad, and, above all, to escape conscription.

== Paris ==
In Paris, Rocker first came into contact with Jewish anarchism. In Spring 1893, he accepted an invitation to attend a meeting of Jewish anarchists, and was profoundly impressed by their ideas. Though neither a Jew by birth nor by belief, he subsequently frequented the group's meetings, eventually holding lectures himself. Solomon Rappaport, later known as S. Ansky, allowed Rocker to live with him, as they were both typographers and could share Rappaport's tools. During this period, Rocker also first came into contact with the blending of anarchist and syndicalist ideas represented by the General Confederation of Labor (CGT), which would influence him in the long term. In 1895, as a result of the anti-anarchist sentiment in France, Rocker traveled to London to visit the German consulate and examine the possibility of his returning to Germany but was told he would be imprisoned upon return.

== London ==
=== First years in London ===
Rocker decided to stay in London. He was employed as the librarian of the Communist Workers' Educational Union, where he met Louise Michel and Errico Malatesta, two influential anarchists. Inspired to visit the quarter after reading about "Darkest London" in the works of John Henry Mackay, he was appalled by the poverty he witnessed in the predominantly Jewish East End. He joined the Jewish anarchist Arbeter Fraint group he had obtained information about from his French comrades, quickly becoming a regular lecturer at its meetings. There, he met his lifelong companion Milly Witkop, a Ukrainian-born Jew who had fled to London in 1894. In May 1897, having lost his job and with little chance of re-employment, Rocker was persuaded by a friend to move to New York. Witkop agreed to accompany him and they arrived on the 29th. They were, however, not admitted into the country, because they were not legally married. They refused to formalize their relationship. Rocker explained that their "bond is one of free agreement between my wife and myself. It is a purely private matter that only concerns ourselves, and it needs no confirmation from the law." Witkop added: "Love is always free. When love ceases to be free it is prostitution." The matter received front-page coverage in the national press. The Commissioner-General of Immigration, the former Knights of Labor President Terence V. Powderly, advised the couple to marry to settle the matter, but they refused and were deported back to England on the same ship they had arrived on.

Unable to find employment upon return, Rocker decided to move to Liverpool. A former Whitechapel comrade of his persuaded him to become the editor of a recently founded Yiddish weekly newspaper called Dos Fraye Vort (The Free Word), even though he did not speak the language at the time. The newspaper only appeared for eight issues, but it led the Arbeter Fraint group to re-launch its eponymous newspaper and invite Rocker to return to the capital and take over as its editor.

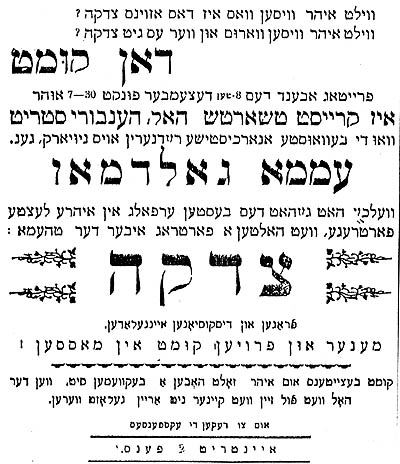
1899 advertisement in Arbayter Fraynd for a lecture by Emma Goldman

Although it received some funds from Jews in New York, the journal's financial survival was precarious from the start. Many volunteers helped by selling the paper on street corners and in workshops. During this time, Rocker was especially concerned with combating the influence of Marxism and historical materialism in London's Jewish labor movement. In all, the Arbeter Fraint published twenty-five essays by Rocker on the topic, the first ever critical examination of Marxism in Yiddish, according to William J. Fishman. Arbeter Fraint's unsound financial footing also meant Rocker rarely received the small salary promised to him when he took over the journal and he depended financially on Witkop. Despite Rocker's sacrifices, the paper was forced to cease publication due to lack of funds. In November 1899, the prominent American anarchist Emma Goldman visited London and Rocker met her for the first time. After hearing of the Arbeter Fraint's situation she held three lectures to raise funds, but that was not enough.

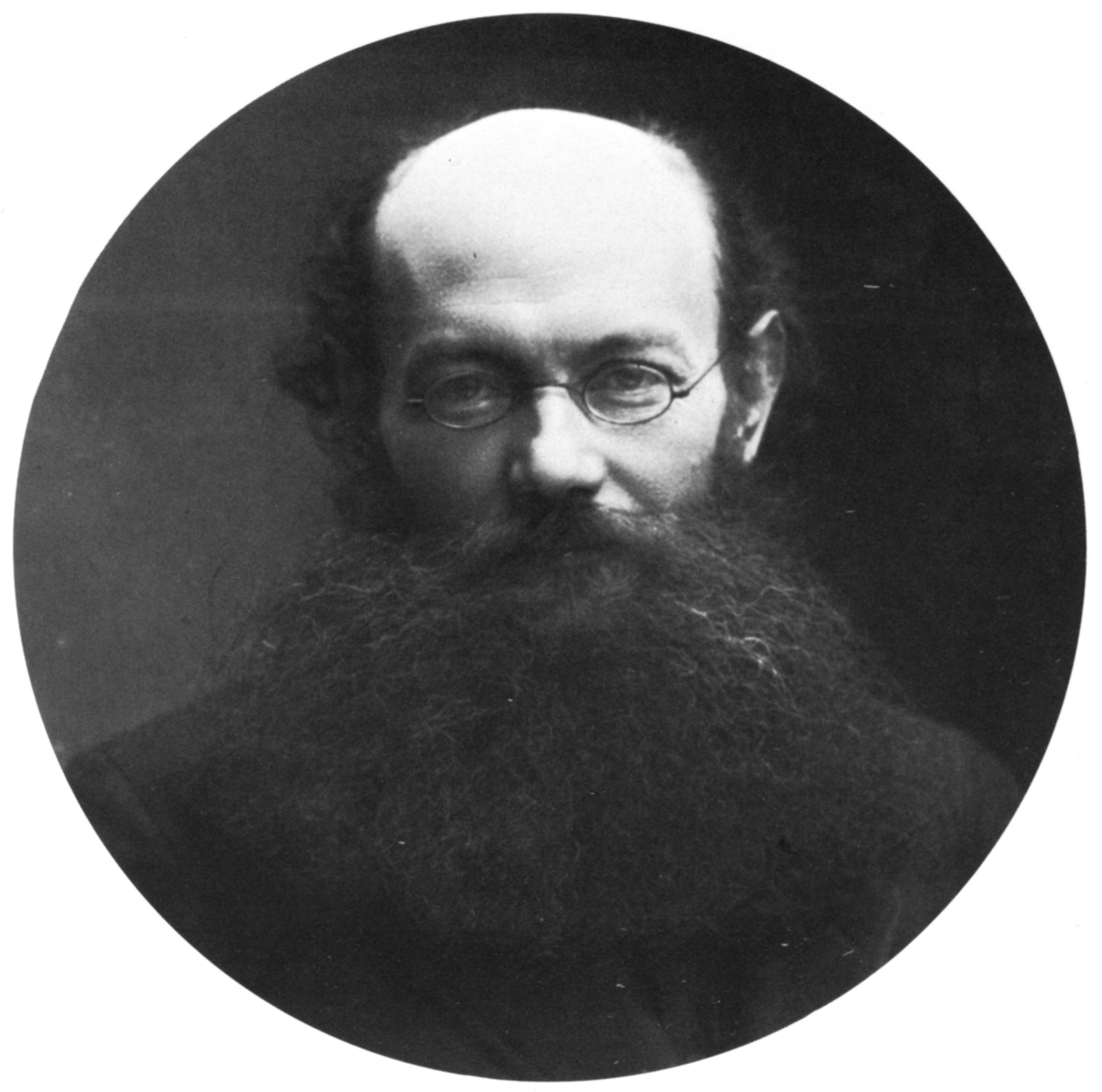
Peter Kropotkin

Not wanting to be left without any means of propaganda, Rocker founded the Germinal in March 1900. Compared to Arbeter Fraint, it was more theoretical, applying anarchist thought to the analysis of literature and philosophy. It represented a maturation of Rocker's thinking towards Kropotkin-ite anarchism and would survive until March 1903. 1902 saw the London Jews being targeted by a wave of anti-alien sentiment, while Rocker was away for a year in Leeds. Upon return in September, he was happy to see the Jewish anarchists had kept the Arbeter Fraint organization alive. A conference of all Jewish anarchists of the city on December 26 decided for a re-launch of the Arbeter Fraint newspaper as the organ of all Jewish anarchists in Great Britain and Paris and made Rocker the editor. The first issue appeared on March 20, 1903. Following the Kishinev pogrom in the Russian Empire, Rocker led a demonstration in solidarity with the victims, the largest ever gathering of Jews in London. Afterwards he traveled to Leeds, Glasgow, and Edinburgh to lecture on the topic.

=== Jewish anarchism's golden years ===
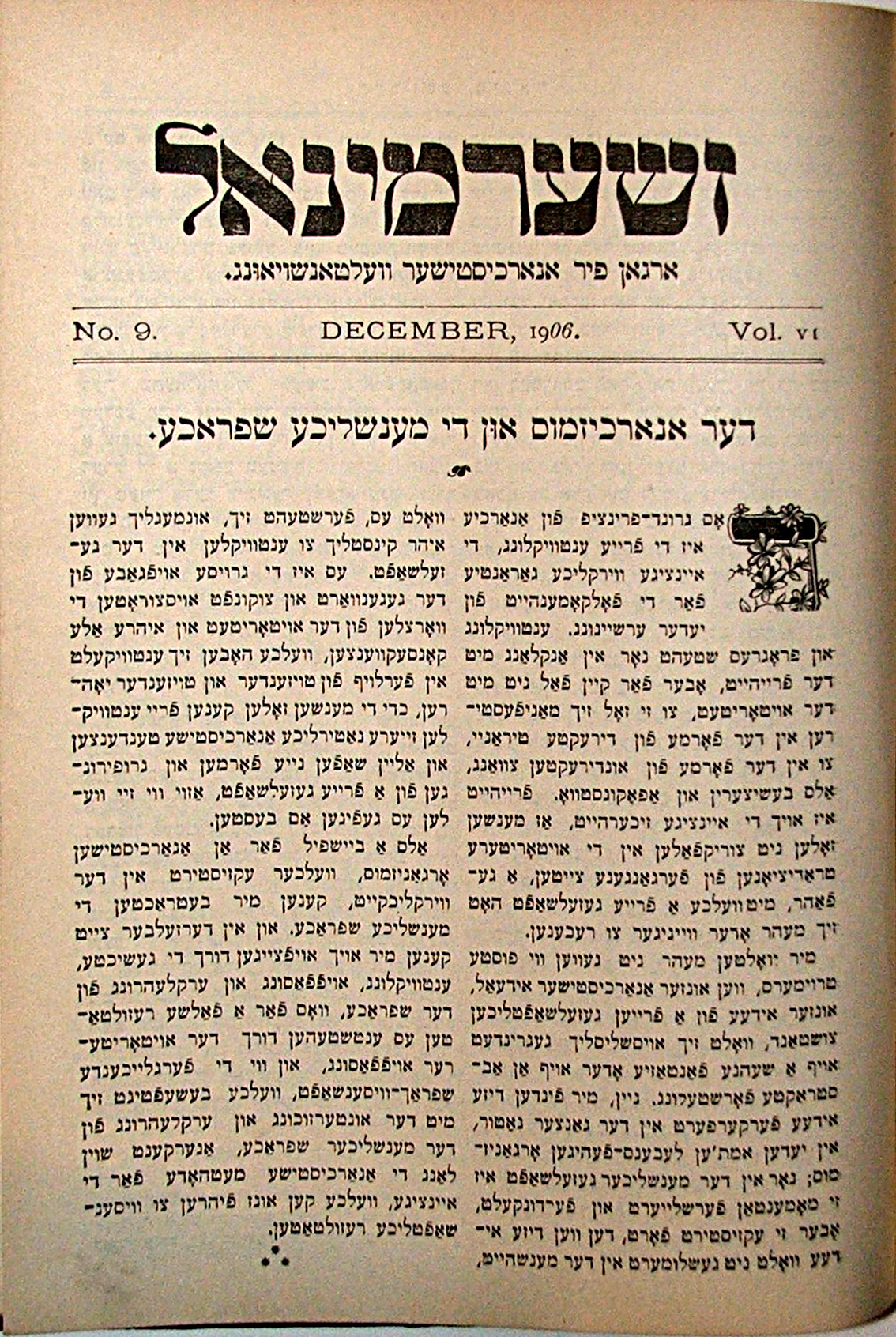
December 1906 edition of Germinal

From 1904, the Jewish labor and anarchist movements in London reached their "golden years", according to William J. Fishman. In 1905, publication of Germinal resumed, it reached a circulation of 2,500 a year later, while Arbeter Fraint reached a demand of 5,000 copies. In 1906, the Arbeter Fraint group finally realized a long-time goal, the establishment of a club for both Jewish and gentile workers. The Workers' Friend Club was founded in a former Methodist church on Jubilee Street. Rocker, by now a very eloquent speaker, became a regular speaker. As a result of the popularity of both the club and Germinal beyond the anarchist scene, Rocker befriended many prominent non-anarchist Jews in London, among them the Zionist philosopher Ber Borochov.

From June 8, 1906, Rocker was involved in a garment workers' strike. Wages and working conditions in the East End were much lower than in the rest of London and tailoring was the most important industry. Rocker was asked by the union leading the strike to become part of the strike committee along with two other Arbeter Fraint members. He was a regular speaker at the strikers' gatherings. The strike failed, because the strike funds ran out. By July 1, all workers were back in their workshops.

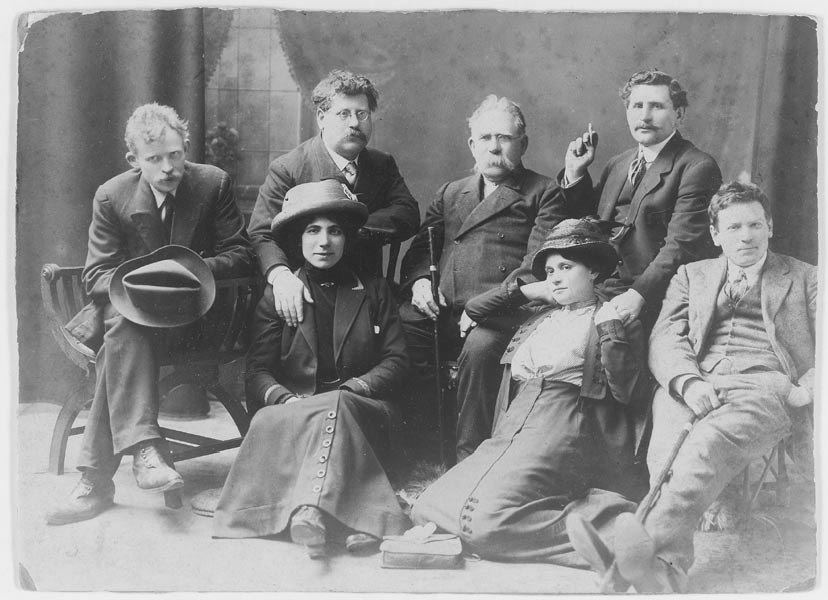
Rudolf Rocker (back row, second from left) with several London anarchists. Rocker's arm lies over Milly Witkop's shoulder.

Rocker represented the federation at the International Anarchist Congress in Amsterdam in 1907. Errico Malatesta, Alexander Schapiro, and he became the secretaries of the new Anarchist International, but it only lasted until 1911. Also in 1907, his son Fermin was born. In 1909, while visiting France, Rocker denounced the execution of the anarchist pedagogue Francisco Ferrer in Barcelona, leading him to be deported back to England.

In 1912, Rocker was once again an important figure in a strike by London's garment makers. In late April, 1,500 tailors from the West End, who were more highly skilled and better-paid than those in the East End, started striking. By May, the total number was between 7,000 and 8,000. Since much of the West Enders' work was now being performed in the East End, the tailors' union there, under the influence of the Arbeter Fraint group, decided to support the strike. Rudolf Rocker on the one hand saw this as a chance for the East End tailors to attack the sweatshop system, but on the other was afraid of an anti-Semitic backlash, should the Jewish workers remain idle. He called for a general strike. His call was not followed, since over seventy percent of the East End tailors were engaged in the ready-made trade, which was not linked with the West End workers' strike. Nonetheless, 13,000 immigrant garment workers from the East End went on strike following a May 8 assembly at which Rocker spoke. Not one worker voted against a strike. Rocker became a member of the strike committee and chairman of the finance sub-committee. He was responsible for collecting money and other necessities for the striking workers. On the side he published the Arbeter Fraint newspaper on a daily basis to disseminate news about the strike. He spoke at the workers' assemblies and demonstrations. On May 24 a mass meeting was held to discuss the question of whether to settle on a compromise proposed by the employers, which did not entail a closed union shop. A speech by Rocker convinced the workers to continue the strike. By the next morning, all of the workers' demands were met.

=== World War I ===
Rocker opposed both sides in World War I on internationalist grounds. Although most in the United Kingdom and continental Europe expected a short war, Rocker predicted on August 7, 1914 "a period of mass murder such as the world has never known before" and attacked the Second International for not opposing the conflict. Rocker with some other Arbeter Fraint members opened up a soup kitchen without fixed prices to alleviate the further impoverishment that came with the Great War. There was a debate between Kropotkin, who supported the Allies, and Rocker in Arbeter Fraint in October and November. He called the war "the contradiction of everything we had fought for".

Shortly after the publication of this statement, on December 2, Rocker was arrested and interned as an enemy alien. This was also the result of the anti-German sentiment in the country. Arbeiter Fraynd was suppressed in 1915. The Jewish anarchist movement in Britain never fully recovered from these blows.

== Return to Germany ==
=== FVdG ===
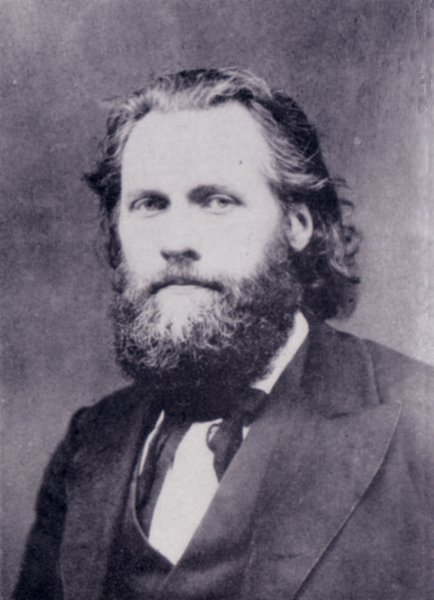
Ferdinand Domela Nieuwenhuis

In March 1918, Rocker was taken to the Netherlands under an agreement to exchange prisoners through the Red Cross. He stayed at the house of the socialist leader Ferdinand Domela Nieuwenhuis and he recovered from the health problems from which he suffered as a result of his internment in the UK and met up with his wife Milly Witkop and his son Fermin. He returned to Germany in November 1918 upon an invitation from Fritz Kater to join him in Berlin to re-build the Free Association of German Trade Unions (FVdG). The FVdG was a radical labor federation that quit the SPD in 1908 and became increasingly syndicalist and anarchist. During World War I, it had been unable to continue its activities for fear of government repression, but remained in existence as an underground organization.

Rocker was opposed to the FVdG's alliance with the communists during and immediately after the November Revolution, as he rejected Marxism, especially the concept of the dictatorship of the proletariat. Soon after arriving in Germany, however, he once again became seriously ill. He started giving public speeches in March 1919, including one at a congress of munitions workers in Erfurt, where he urged them to stop producing war material. During this period the FVdG grew rapidly and the coalition with the communists soon began to crumble. Eventually all syndicalist members of the Communist Party were expelled. From December 27 to December 30, 1919, the twelfth national congress of the FVdG was held in Berlin.

The organization decided to become the Free Workers' Union of Germany (FAUD) under a new platform, which had been written by Rocker: the Prinzipienerklärung des Syndikalismus (Declaration of Syndicalist Principles). It rejected political parties and the dictatorship of the proletariat as bourgeois concepts. The program recognized only decentralized, purely economic, organizations. Although public ownership of land, means of production, and raw materials was advocated, nationalization and the idea of a communist state were rejected. Rocker decried nationalism as the religion of the modern state and opposed violence, championing instead direct action and the education of the workers.

=== Heyday of syndicalism ===
On Gustav Landauer's death during the Munich Soviet Republic uprising, Rocker took over the work of editing the German publications of Kropotkin's writings. In 1920, the social democratic Defense Minister Gustav Noske started the suppression of the revolutionary left, which led to the imprisonment of Rocker and Fritz Kater. During their mutual detainment, Rocker convinced Kater, who had still held some social democratic ideals, completely of anarchism.

In the following years, Rocker became one of the most regular writers in the FAUD organ Der Syndikalist. In 1920, the FAUD hosted an international syndicalist conference, which ultimately led to the founding of the International Workers' Association (IWA) in December 1922. Augustin Souchy, Alexander Schapiro, and Rocker became the organization's secretaries and Rocker wrote its platform. In 1921, he wrote the pamphlet Der Bankrott des russischen Staatskommunismus (The Bankruptcy of Russian State Communism) attacking the Soviet Union. He denounced what he considered a massive oppression of individual freedoms and the suppression of anarchists starting with the purge on April 12, 1918. He supported instead the workers who took part in the Kronstadt uprising and the peasant movement led by the anarchist Nestor Makhno, whom he would meet in Berlin in 1923. In 1924, Rocker published a biography of Johann Most called Das Leben eines Rebellen (The Life of a Rebel). There are great similarities between the men's vitas. It was Rocker who convinced the anarchist historian Max Nettlau to start publication of his anthology Geschichte der Anarchie (History of Anarchy) in 1925.

=== Decline of syndicalism ===
During the mid-1920s, the decline of Germany's syndicalist movement started. The FAUD had reached its peak of around 150,000 members in 1921, but then started losing members to both the Communist and the Social Democratic Party. Rocker attributed this loss of membership to the mentality of German workers accustomed to military discipline, accusing the communists of using similar tactics to the Nazis and thus attracting such workers. At first only planning a short book on nationalism, he started work on Nationalism and Culture, which would be published in 1937 and become one of Rocker's best-known works, around 1925. 1925 also saw Rocker visit North America on a lecture tour with a total of 162 appearances. He was encouraged by the anarcho-syndicalist movement he found in the US and Canada.

Returning to Germany in May 1926, he became increasingly worried about the rise of nationalism and fascism. He wrote to Nettlau in 1927: "Every nationalism begins with a Mazzini, but in its shadow there lurks a Mussolini". In 1929, Rocker was a co-founder of the Gilde freiheitlicher Bücherfreunde (Guild of Libertarian Bibliophiles), a publishing house which would release works by Alexander Berkman, William Godwin, Erich Mühsam, and John Henry Mackay. In the same year he went on a lecture tour in Scandinavia and was impressed by the anarcho-syndicalists there. Upon return, he wondered whether Germans were even capable of anarchist thought. In the 1930 elections, the Nazi Party received 18.3% of all votes, a total of 6 million. Rocker was worried: "Once the Nazis get to power, we'll all go the way of Landauer and Eisner" (who had been killed by reactionaries in the course of the Munich Soviet Republic uprising).

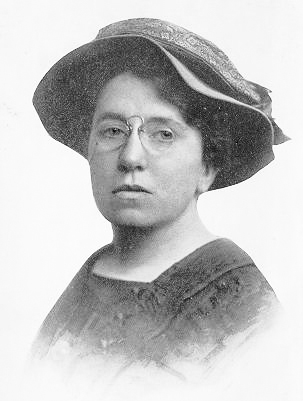
Emma Goldman

In 1931, Rocker attended the IWA congress in Madrid and then the unveiling of the Nieuwenhuis memorial in Amsterdam. In 1933, the Nazis came to power. After the Reichstag fire on February 27, Rocker and Witkop decided to leave Germany. As they left they received news of Erich Mühsam's arrest. After his death in July 1934, Rocker would write a pamphlet called Der Leidensweg Erich Mühsams (The Life and Suffering of Erich Mühsam) about the anarchist's fate. Rocker reached Basel, Switzerland on March 8 by the last train to cross the border without being searched. Two weeks later, Rocker and his wife joined Emma Goldman in St. Tropez, France. There he wrote Der Weg ins Dritte Reich (The Path to the Third Reich) about the events in Germany, but it would only be published in Spanish.

In May, Rocker and Witkop moved back to London. Rocker was welcomed there by many of the Jewish anarchists he had lived and fought alongside for many years. He held lectures all over the city. In July, he attended an extraordinary IWA meeting in Paris, which decided to smuggle its organ Die Internationale into Nazi Germany.

== United States ==
=== First years ===
On August 26, 1933, Rocker with his wife emigrated to New York. There they were reunited with Fermin who had stayed there after accompanying his father on his 1929 lecture tour in the US. The Rocker family moved to live with a sister of Witkop's in Towanda, Pennsylvania where many families with progressive or libertarian socialist views lived. In October, Rocker toured the US and Canada speaking about racism, fascism, dictatorship, socialism in English, Yiddish, and German. He found many of his Jewish comrades from London, who had since emigrated to America, and became a regular writer for Freie Arbeiter Stimme, a Jewish anarchist newspaper. Back in Towanda, in the summer of 1934, Rocker started work on an autobiography, but news of Erich Mühsam's death led him to halt his work. He was working on Nationalism and Culture, when the Spanish Civil War broke out in July 1936 instilling great optimism in Rocker. He published a pamphlet The Truth about Spain and contributed to The Spanish Revolution, a special fortnightly newspaper published by American anarchists to report on the events in Spain. In 1937, he wrote The Tragedy of Spain, which analyzed the events in greater detail. In September 1937, Rocker and Witkop moved to the libertarian commune Mohegan Colony about 50 miles (80 km) from New York City.

=== Nationalism and Culture and Anarcho-Syndicalism ===
In 1937, Nationalism and Culture, which he had started work on around 1925, was finally published with the help of anarchists from Chicago Rocker had met in 1933. A Spanish edition was released in three volumes in Barcelona, the stronghold of the Spanish anarchists. It would be his best-known work. In the book, Rocker traces the origins of the state back to religion claiming "that all politics is in the last instance religion": both enslave their very creator, man; both claim to be the source of cultural progress. He aims to prove the claim that culture and power are essentially antagonistic concepts. He applies this model to human history, analyzing the Middle Ages, the Renaissance, Enlightenment, and modern capitalist society, and to the history of the socialist movement. He concludes by advocating a "new humanitarian socialism".

In 1938, Rocker published a history of anarchist thought, which he traced all the way back to ancient times, under the name Anarcho-Syndicalism. A modified version of the essay would be published in the Philosophical Library series European Ideologies under the name Anarchism and Anarcho-Syndicalism in 1949.

=== World War II, and publication of Pioneers of American Freedom ===
In 1939, Rocker had to undergo a serious operation and was forced to give up lecture tours. However, in the same year, the Rocker Publications Committee was formed by anarchists in Los Angeles to translate and publish Rocker's writings. Many of his friends died around this time: Alexander Berkman in 1936, Emma Goldman in 1940, Max Nettlau in 1944; many more were imprisoned in Nazi concentration camps. Although Rocker had opposed his teacher Kropotkin for his support of the Allies during World War I, Rocker argued that the Allied effort in World War II was just, as it would ultimately lead to preservation of libertarian values. Although he viewed every state as a coercive apparatus designed to secure the economic exploitation of the masses, he defended democratic freedoms, which he considered a result of a desire for freedom of the enlightened public. This position was criticized by many American anarchists, who did not support any war.

After World War II, an appeal in the Freie Arbeiter Stimme detailing the plight of German anarchists called for Americans to support them. By February 1946, the sending of aid parcels to anarchists in Germany was a large-scale operation. In 1947, Rocker published Zur Betrachtung der Lage in Deutschland (Regarding the Portrayal of the Situation in Germany) about the impossibility of another anarchist movement in Germany. It became the first post-World War II anarchist writing to be distributed in Germany. Rocker thought young Germans were all either totally cynical or inclined to fascism and awaited a new generation to grow up before anarchism could bloom once again in the country. Nevertheless, the Federation of Libertarian Socialists (FFS) was founded in 1947 by former FAUD members. Rocker wrote for its organ, Die Freie Gesellschaft, which survived until 1953. In 1949, Rocker published another well-known work. In Pioneers of American Freedom, a series of essays, he details the history of liberal and anarchist thought in the United States, seeking to debunk the idea that radical thought was foreign to American history and culture and had merely been imported by immigrants.

== Final years ==
On his eightieth birthday in 1953, a dinner was held in London to honor Rocker. Words of tribute were read by the likes of Thomas Mann, Albert Einstein, Herbert Read, and Bertrand Russell.

== Political position ==
Rocker is often described as an anarcho-syndicalist and wrote key introductory texts to that approach as well as the syndicalist platform of the FAUD. He was also close to anarchist communists like Kropotkin. Historian Paul Avrich argues that he was a self-professed anarchist without adjectives, believing that anarchist schools of thought represented "only different methods of economy" and that the first objective for anarchists was "to secure the personal and social freedom of men".

== Works ==
Books

- Nationalism and Culture
- Anarcho-Syndicalism: Theory and Practice
- Pioneers of American Freedom
- The Tragedy of Spain
- Anarchism and Anarcho-Syndicalism

Articles

- Anarchism and Sovietism
- Federalism
- Marx and Anarchism

Memoirs
Rocker wrote three volumes of memoirs, which have been published in Spanish and Yiddish translations from a German typescript:

- La juventud de un rebelde (Spanish, 1947); Di yugnṭ fun a rebel (Yiddish, 1965); Die Jugend eines Rebellen (German, 2023)
- En la borrasca: Años de destierro (Spanish, 1949); In shṭurem: Goleś-yorn (Yiddish, 1952); Im Sturm der Zeiten (German, 2025)
- Revolución y Regresión (Spanish, 1952); Reṿolutsye un regresye (Yiddish, 1963)

The second volume is the only part of the memoirs to have appeared in English, in 1956 and re-edited in 2005, with the title of The London Years, which is an abridgement of the second volume.

== See also ==
- Anarchism in Germany

== Sources ==
- Avrich, Paul (2006). Anarchist Voices. Stirling: AK Press. ISBN 978-1-904859-27-7.
- Barsky, Robert F. (1998). "Bakhtin as anarchist? Language, law, and creative impulses in the work of Mikhail Bakhtin and Rudolf Rocker". The South Atlantic Quarterly. 97 (3/4): 623–642. doi:10.1215/00382876-97-3/4-623. hdl:1803/3836. S2CID 147080092.
- Bock, Hans-Manfred (1969). Syndikalismus und Linkskommunismus von 1918 bis 1923: Ein Beitrag zur Sozial- und Ideengeschichte der frühen Weimarer Republik. Meisenheim am Glan: Verlag Anton Hain.
- Buhle, Paul (1992). "Rocker, Paul". In Buhle, Mari Jo; Buhle, Paul; Georgakas, Dan (eds.). Encyclopedia of the American Left. Urbana, IL: University of Illinois Press. pp. XXX.
- Carlson, Andrew R. (1972). Anarchism in Germany: Vol. I: The Early Movement. Metuchen, NJ: Scarecrow Press.
- Dorfman, Joseph (August 1950). "Review: Pioneers of American Freedom: Origin of Liberal and Radical Thought in America by Rudolf Rocker". The Journal of Political Economy. 58 (4). Chicago: University of Chicago Press: 362–363. doi:10.1086/256970. ISSN 0022-3808. OCLC 1754747.
- Ferguson, Kathy E.(2023). Letterpress Revolution: the Politics of Anarchist Print Culture. 1st ed. Durham: Duke University.
- Fishman, William J. (January 1966). "Rudolf Rocker: Anarchist missionary (1873–1958)". History Today. 16 (1). London: History Today Limited: 75–95. ISSN 0018-2753. OCLC 1644842.
- Fishman, William J. (1974). Jewish Radicals: From Czarist Stetl to London Ghetto. New York: Pantheon Books. ISBN 978-0-394-49764-8.
- Fishman, William J. (2004). "Rocker, Rudolf (1873–1958)". Oxford Dictionary of National Biography. Oxford Dictionary of National Biography (online ed.). Oxford University Press. doi:10.1093/ref:odnb/58606. (Subscription, Wikipedia Library access or UK public library membership required.)
- Graur, Mina (1994). "Anarcho-Nationalism: Anarchist Attitudes towards Jewish Nationalism and Zionism". Modern Judaism. 14 (1): 1–19. doi:10.1093/mj/14.1.1.
- Graur, Mina (1997). An Anarchist Rabbi: The Life and Teachings of Rudolf Rocker. New York: St. Martin's Press. ISBN 978-0-312-17273-2. Thesis version
- Krämer, Reinhard (2002). "Die Mainzer Jahre des Anarchisten Rudolf Rocker". Mainzer Zeitschrift (in German). 96/97. Mainz: Verlag Philipp von Zabern: 315–323. ISSN 0076-2792. OCLC 1413993.
- Leftwich, Joseph (1987). "Rudolf Rocker: Mentor of the Jewish Anarchists". Jewish Quarterly. 34 (2): 30–33.
- Levy, Carl (2018). "Anarchism and Cosmopolitanism". The Palgrave Handbook of Anarchism. Cham: Palgrave Macmillan. pp. 125–148.
- Linse, Ulrich (1969). Organisierter Anarchismus im Deutschen Kaiserreich von 1871. Berlin: Duncker & Humblot.
- Morris, Brian (2012). "Rudolf Rocker 1873–1958: A Tribute". Anarchist Studies. 20 (2): 11–21.
- Reichert, William O. (1976). Partisans of Freedom: A Study in American Anarchism. Bowling Green, Ohio: Bowling Green University Popular Press. ISBN 978-0-87972-118-3.
- Rocker, Rudolf (1947). Anarcho-Syndicalism: Theory & Practice: An Introduction to a Subject which the Spanish War has Brought into Prominence. Modern Publishers.
- Rothfels, Hans; Rocker, Rudolf (July 1951). "Review: Die Entscheidung des Abendlandes by Rudolf Rocker". American Historical Review. 56 (4). Washington: American Historical Association: 839–841. doi:10.2307/1851988. ISSN 0002-8762. JSTOR 1851988. OCLC 1830326.
- Rübner, Hartmut (1998). "'Eine unvollkommene Demokratie ist besser als eine vollkommene Despotie': Rudolf Rockers Wandlung vom kommunistischen Anarchisten zum libertären Revisionisten". Archiv für die Geschichte des Widerstandes und der Arbeit. 15: 205–226.
- Rübner, Hartmut (1994). Freiheit und Brot: Die Freie Arbeiter-Union Deutschlands (FAUD): Eine Studie zur Geschichte des Anarchosyndikalismus. Berlin: Libertad Verlag.
- Rübner, Hartmut (2007). "Rocker, Rudolf". Datenbank des deutschsprachigen Anarchismus (in German).
- Vallance, Margaret (July 1973). "Rudolf Rocker – a biographical sketch". Journal of Contemporary History. 8 (3). London/Beverly Hills: Sage Publications: 75–95. doi:10.1177/002200947300800304. ISSN 0022-0094. OCLC 49976309. S2CID 159569041.
- Vogel, Angela (1977). Der deutsche Anarcho-Syndikalismus: Genese und Theorie einer vergessenen Bewegung. Berlin: Karin Kramer Verlag.
- Wienand, Peter (1981). Der "geborene" Rebell: Rudolf Rocker – Leben und Werk (in German). Berlin: Karin Kramer Verlag. ISBN 978-3-87956-106-3.
- The Anarchist Rabbi (2014), BFI, dir., Adam Kossoff, a film about Rudolf Rocker's time in London
