= Germinal (journal) =

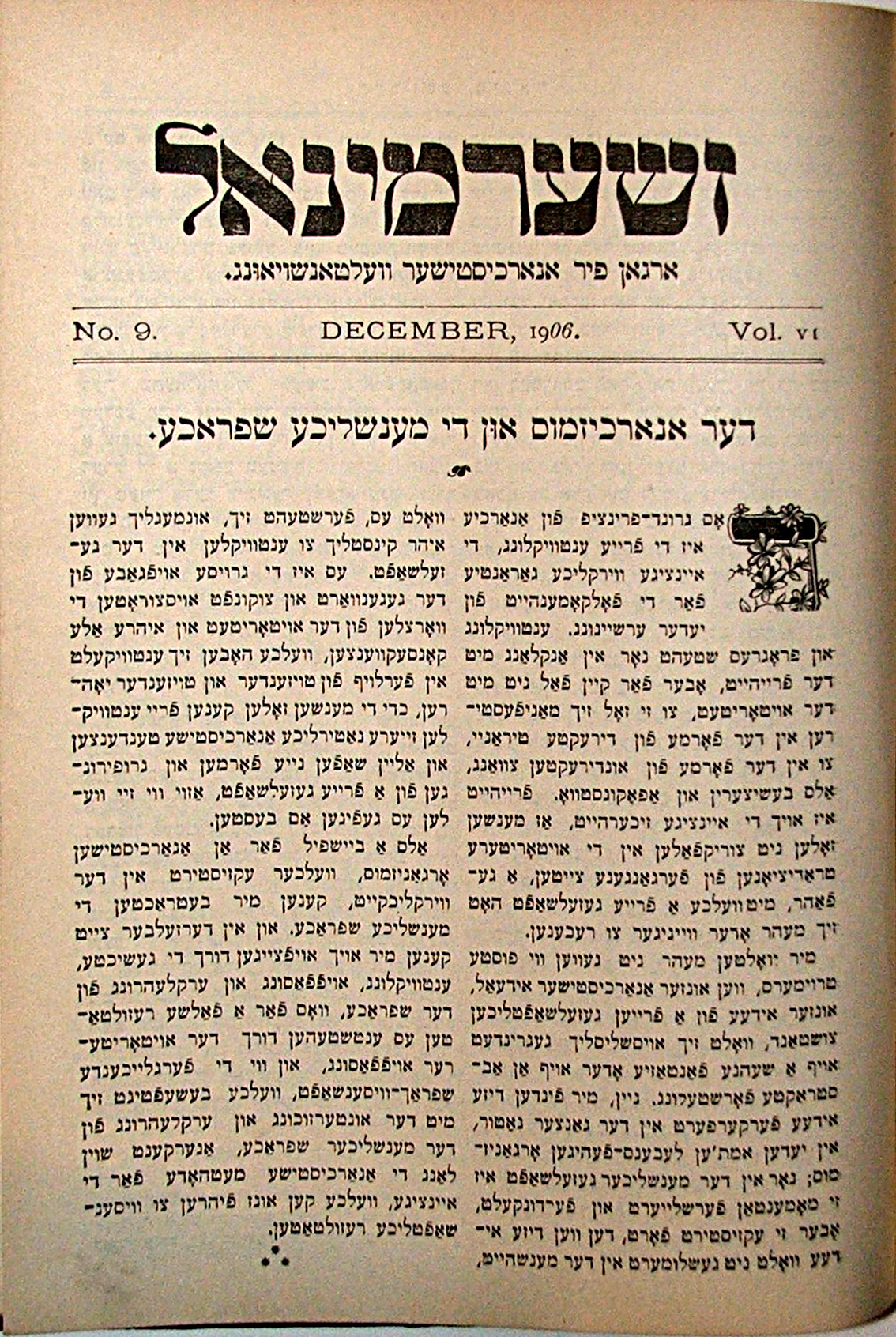
December 1906 edition of Germinal

Germinal (זשערמינאל, also transliterated as Zsherminal) was a Yiddish-language anarchist journal in London edited by the German-born Rudolf Rocker. It appeared from 1900 to 1903, and then again from 1905 to 1908.

== History ==
In 1898, the Yiddish anarchist newspaper Arbeter Fraynd hired Rudolf Rocker, a non-Jew, who had just started learning the language, as its editor. However, despite an intervention by Emma Goldman and the devotion of many activists trying to save the paper, it had to be shut down for financial reasons in January 1900. Yet, the Jewish anarchists who published Arbeter Fraynd were unwilling to be left without any means of spreading their message. Therefore, Rocker, with the assistance of a young printer known as Israel Narodiczky, founded the sixteen-page journal, which was published every fortnight and named after Émile Zola's novel of the same name. Compared to Arbeter Fraynd, it was directed at a more intellectual audience and dealt with philosophy and literature using libertarian concepts to analyse them. In 1903, it also had to stop publication for lack of money.

In January 1905, Germinal was revived by Rocker and his comrades. The Jewish anarchist labour movement in London was on the rise, so the journal was able to reach a demand of 2,500 by the following year, when it was expanded to 48 pages. Publication of Arbeter Fraynd had resumed in 1903, so Germinal now had the role of the more intellectual equivalent of that newspaper, which was the more widespread of the two.

The journal's influence reached far beyond London. Most cities in the world with a considerable recent Russian or Polish Jewish settlement had Germinal readers: most of the larger cities in the United States, Paris, Berlin, Bucharest, Sofia, Cairo, Alexandria, Johannesburg, Cape Town, and Buenos Aires. Alexander Granach, one of the leading actors of Weimar Germany, was introduced to the world of literature by Germinal.

Nevertheless, publication of Germinal ceased in 1908.
