= Palaio =

Palaio may refer to the following places in Greece:

- Palaio Faliro, suburb in the southern part of Athens
- Palaio Loutro, small mountain village in Messenia, Peloponnese
- Palaio Olvio, settlement in the Xanthi regional unit
- Palaio Pedino, village on the island of Lemnos
