= Brian Morris (anthropologist) =

- Born: 18 October 1936 (age 89)
- Education: Brighton College of Education; London School of Economics
- Occupation: Anthropologist
- Employer: Goldsmiths, University of London
- Website: brianmorris.org.uk

Brian Morris (born 18 October 1936) is emeritus professor of anthropology at Goldsmiths College at the University of London. He is a specialist on folk taxonomy, ethnobotany and ethnozoology, and on religion and symbolism. He has carried out fieldwork among South Asian hunter-gatherers and in Malawi. Groups that he has studied include the Ojibwa. He has also written widely on the history of ideas and in particular on anarchism.

== Biography ==
Brian Morris was born in the Black Country. He left school at fifteen.

He worked as a tea planter in Malawi. He became an anarchist in the mid-1960s, and remained active in several protests and political movements. He later received a doctorate in social anthropology at the London School of Economics, doing his PhD ethnographic fieldwork with Malaipantaram hunter-gatherers in Southern India.

He has written books and articles on ecology, botany, ethnobotany and ethnobiology, political philosophy, religion, anthropology, and social anarchism. His 2004 Kropotkin: The Politics of Community, published by PM Press, locates anarchist thinker Peter Kropotkin within intellectual history as a theorist of social science, power, and ecology.

== Books ==
- Forest Traders: a Socio-economic Study of the Hill Pandaram (1982), Humanities Press
- Anthropological Studies of Religion (1987), Cambridge University Press, ISBN 0-521-33991-X
- Bakunin: The Philosophy of Freedom (1993), Black Rose Books, ISBN 1-895431-66-2
- Anthropology Of The Self: The Individual In Cultural Perspective (1994)
- The Power Of Animals (1998), Berg
- Western Conceptions of the Individual (1991) Berg, ISBN 0-85496-698-6
- Animals and Ancestors: An Ethnography (2000), Berg
- Insects and Human Life (2004), Berg, ISBN 1-85973-847-8
- Kropotkin: The Politics of Community (2004), ISBN 978-1-59102-158-2
- The History and Conservation of Mammals in Malawi (2004), Kachere Series (Zomba), ISBN 99908-76-69-X
- Common Mushrooms of Malawi (1987) Fungiflora A/S, ISBN 82-90724-00-4
- Religion And Anthropology: A Critical Introduction (2006), Cambridge University Press
- Ernest Thompson Seton, Founder of the Woodcraft Movement 1860-1946: Apostle of Indian Wisdom and Pioneer Ecologist (2007), Edwin Mellen Press (Lewiston), ISBN 0773454748
- The Anarchist Geographer: An Introduction to the Life of Peter Kropotkin (2012), Genge Press (Minehead)
- Pioneers of Ecological Humanism (2012), Book Guild Publishing (Brighton), ISBN 978-1-84624-866-5
- Anthropology, Ecology, and Anarchism: A Brian Morris Reader (2014), PM Press, ISBN 978-1-60486-093-1
- Pioneers of Ecological Humanism: Mumford, Dubos, and Bookchin (2017), Black Rose Books, ISBN 978-1-55164-607-7
- Visions of Freedom: Critical Writings on Ecology and Anarchism (2018), Black Rose Books, ISBN 978-1-55164-644-2
- Kropotkin: The Politics of Community (2018), PM Press, ISBN 978-1-62963-505-7
- Anthropology and Dialectical Naturalism: A Philosophical Manifesto (2020), Black Rose Books, ISBN 978-1-55164-742-5
- An Ecological Vision of Earth: the Life and Thought of W.H. Hudson (2026), Reuben Books, ISBN 978-1-9993172-8-7
