= Partisans of Freedom =

1976 history book by William O. Reichert

- First edition
- Author: William O. Reichert
- Subject: American history, history of anarchism
- Published: 1976 (Bowling Green University Popular Press)
- Pages: 602
- ISBN: 0879721189

Partisans of Freedom: A Study in American Anarchism is a 1976 history book about the history of anarchism in the United States by William O. Reichert.
