= List of Gdańsk aristocratic families =

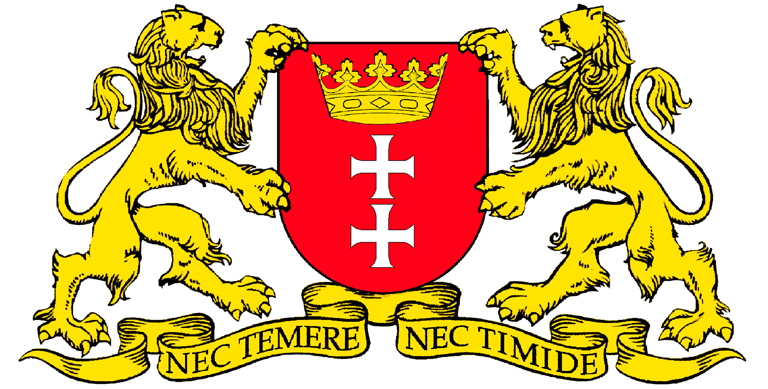
Coat of arms of Gdańsk

This is a list of aristocratic families of the Royal City of Gdańsk (German: Danzig).

It encompasses minority Polish and majority Prussian (German) nobility.

== A ==
Family / Clan	Alternative form(s)	Coat of arms
von Abtshagen	Abzegen	
Ackermann		
Aders-Auerbach		
Adler		
von Allen		
von Almonde		
Amende	am Ende	
von Amstern		
Angermund		
von Arlen	Arlet-lot	
Armack		
Atzinger		
Austin		
Auschwitz		
Aycke		

== B ==
Family / Clan	Alternative form(s)	Coat of arms
Bachmann		
Backe		
von Bagge		
Bahr		
Balfour		
Ball		
von Banck		
Baran		
Baraw	Barau	
de Barbier		
Barclay		
Barkhusen	Barkhause	
Bar	Ber, Börner	
Barthold		
Bartholomäus		
Bastian		
von dem Becke		
Behm		
Benning		
Bentzen	Benson	
Bentzmann	de Bentzmann	
von Bergen		
von Bernighausen		
Bernstein		
Beyer		
von den Block		
Blom	Blumberg	
Blowenow	Blowenau	
von Bobart		
von Bodeck		
von Bömeln		
Boltz		
Boye		
von Brandis		
von Braunschweig		
Breyne		
Brayne		
von Broen	Brun	
von den Brucken		

== C ==
Family / Clan	Alternative form(s)	Coat of arms
Calmus	Kulmens	
von Campier	Cambier	
Chodowiecki		
Clemens		
de Clerk		
Cölmer		
Coletus		
von Conradi	Conrad	
Cosack		
Cramer		
Curicke		

== D ==
Family / Clan	Alternative form(s)	Coat of arms
Dackau		
Dalmer		
Dalwin		
von Damm		
Dammann	Dannemann	
Daniel		
David		
von Danzig	Dantzler	
Davisson		
von Delden	Delen	
von Diesseldorff		
Dietz		
Dilger		
Dodenhoff		
Döring		
von Domsdorff		
von Dorne		

== E ==
Family / Clan	Alternative form(s)	Coat of arms
Ebeling		
Ecklinghoff		
Eggerat		
Eichstädt		
Eler		
von Elsen		
von Ende		
Engelbrecht		
Engelhardt		
Engelke		
Eppenschede		
Erig		
Ernst		
Eschbach		
Eschmann		
Esken		
von Essen		

== F ==
Family / Clan	Alternative form(s)	Coat of arms
Fadenrecht		
Falck	Falkner	
Farenhold		
Feldhusen		
Feldstedt		
Fenrich		
Ferber		
Fichtel		
Fiedler		
Figk		
Finck		
Finkenberg		
Flander		
Forret		
Forste	Fürste	
Franckenberg		
von Frechten		
von Freden		
Freder		
Fremaut		
Friedwald		
Friedrichs		
Friese		

== G ==
Family / Clan	Alternative form(s)	Coat of arms
Gabriel		
von Geldern		
Gellentin		
von Gent		
Gerneth	Gereth	
Giesebrecht		
Gilles		
von Glasow		
von Glaubitz		
Göbel		
Goetz		
von Gorn	Goren	
Gottwald		
Gourlay		
Gradop	Gradorff	
Greverath		

== H ==
Family / Clan	Alternative form(s)	Coat of arms
Haderschlieff		
Hagedorn		
Hagemeister		
Haliburton		
von dem Halle	Helle	
von Hameln		
Haselau		
von Hausen		
Haxelberg		
von Heemskerk		
von Hein	Hayne	
Heidenstein		
von Hemmerdey		
von Herforden		
Herlitz		
von Holty		
Hohenstein		
von Holten	Holsten	
von Huyssen		
Huxer		

== I ==
Family / Clan	Alternative form(s)	Coat of arms
Ibischer		
Iding		
Ilhorn		
Isenhudt		
Ising		

== J ==
Family / Clan	Alternative form(s)	Coat of arms
Jenner		
von Jordan		

== K ==
Family / Clan	Alternative form(s)	Coat of arms
Keckerbart		
Keding		
Kemerer		
Kemerling		
von Kempen		
von Kerschenstein		
Kissling		
Kleefeld		
Klepping		
von Kloster		
Köhn von Jaski		
Koie		
von Koldum		
Koopmann		
von Kositzki		
Krapp		
Krummhusen		
Kultrian		

== L ==
Family / Clan	Alternative form(s)	Coat of arms
Labes		
Lacke		
Laillet		
Langenau		
Langenbeck		
Langwald		
Lauginger		
Laurien		
Lengnich	Lengnick	
Letzkau		
Lewitt		
von der Linde		
Lindershausen		
Lindhorst		
Lobeck		
von Lochen		
Loitz		
Lolhöfel von Löwensprung		
Lütke		

== M ==
Family / Clan	Alternative form(s)	Coat of arms
Mackensen		
Maclean		
Malin		
Mandt		
Maul		
Melmann		
Mein	Minne	
Meyer		
Mittendorf		
Mochinger		
Muhl		
Munckenbeck	Markenbeck	

== N ==
Family / Clan	Alternative form(s)	Coat of arms
Negendanck		
de Neri		
Niederhoff		
Nimsgar		
Nixdorf		
Nothwanger		

== O ==
Family / Clan	Alternative form(s)	Coat of arms
von Obbergen		
Ochsdorf		
Oloff	Olhoff	
Omund		
von Oringen		
Ordun		
Ouseel		
Overam		

== P ==
Family / Clan	Alternative form(s)	Coat of arms
Paleske		
Pambius		
Papst	Pawest	
Passawant		
Pauli		
Pegelau		
von Peschwitz		
Peters		
Pesarovius		
Placatomus		
Pree		
Presting		
Preute		
von Proen		

== R ==
Family / Clan	Alternative form(s)	Coat of arms
von Raeck		
Rammelmann		
Raufeisen		
Rautenberg		
Ravensberg	Ravensburg	
Rechenberg		
von Rehden		
von Rehsen		
Remus		
von der Renne		
Rethe		
Reye	Reyger	
von Roggendorf		
Roland		
von Rosenberg		
von Rosenort		
von Rosten		
Rossau	Rossen	
Rubau		
von Ruden		
von Rüdiger		
Rühle		

== S ==
Family / Clan	Alternative form(s)	Coat of arms
Sachtleben		
Serrurier		
Simson		
von Sittard		
Skubovius		
Speymann	von der Spey	
Stamberger		
Stock		
Stuart		
von Suchten		
von Schachmann		
Schefer-Kochanski		
Scheffer	Scheffler	
von Scheele	Schelle	
von der Schelling		
Scheper		
von Schewecke		
von der Schlage		
Schlakau		
Schopenhauer		
von Schwartzwald		
Schwedlick	Świetlicki	

== T ==
Family / Clan	Alternative form(s)	Coat of arms
Tannenberg		
Tessin		
Thal		
von Tiedemann		
Trosin		
von Trost		
Truhard		
Trunck		
Türck		

== U ==
Family / Clan	Alternative form(s)	Coat of arms
Uphagen		

== V ==
Family / Clan	Alternative form(s)	Coat of arms
von Vechelde		

== W ==
Family / Clan	Alternative form(s)	Coat of arms
Walrabe		
Wartzmann		
von dem Wege		
Weichbrodt	Wekebrodt	
Weimer		
von Werden		
Wiebers		
Wieder	Wider	
Witkop		

== Z ==
Family / Clan	Alternative form(s)	Coat of arms
Zernecke	Zerneke, Zernicovius	
Zierenberg		
Zimmermann		

== See also ==
- List of people from Gdańsk
- List of mayors of Gdańsk
- List of mayors of Danzig

== Sources ==
1. Gdańsk aristocratic families (http://www.gdansk.pl)
2. Bojaruniec, Ewa: Social Advancement among Patrician Families in Gdańsk in the Late Middle Ages and the early modern Period, Acta Historica Universitatis Klaipedensis, XXIX, 2014, 150–170. ISSN 1392-4095. (PDF)
