= Serrurier =

Serrurier (pronounced [se.ʁy.ʁje]) or Sérurier is a surname that derives from serrurier which means locksmith in French. Notable people with the surname include:

- Pierre Serrurier - Dutch millenarian theologian
- Doug Serrurier - South African racing driver and racing car constructor
- Mark Serrurier - American engineer who designed the Serrurier truss
- Auguste Serrurier - French competitor in the sport of archery
- Mark Serrurier - son of Dutch-born electrical engineer, Iwan Serrurier
- Iwan Serrurier - Dutch-born electrical engineer notable for inventing the Moviola
- Jean-Mathieu-Philibert Sérurier - French marshal of the Empire
- Louis Barbe Charles Sérurier, French diplomat
- Louis Serrurier - South African cricketer
- Gustave Serrurier-Bovy - Belgian architect and furniture designer
