= Arsenic pentoxide =

Diarsenic pentoxide
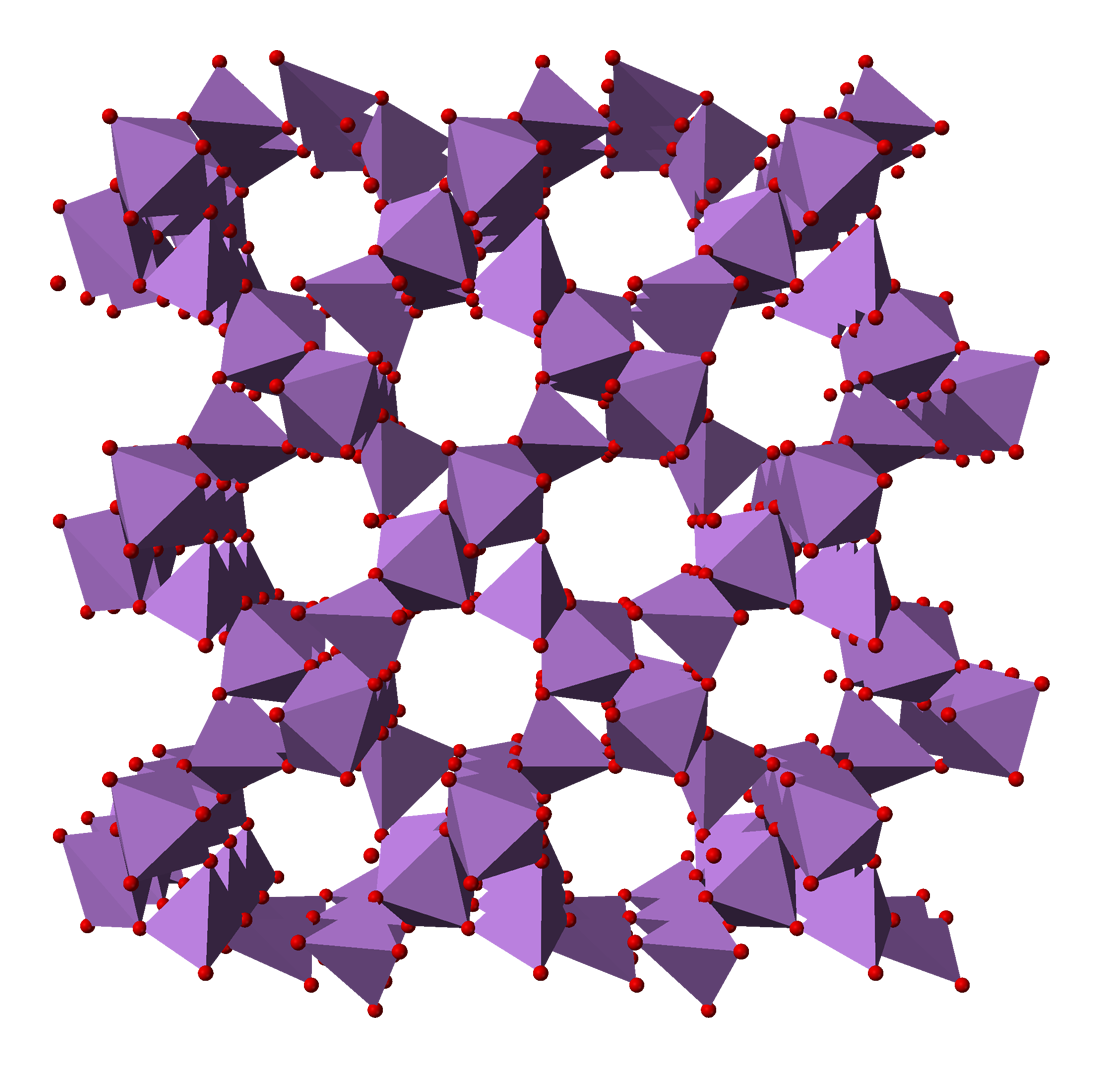
- Arsenic pentoxide

Names
- Other names Arsenic(V) oxide Neutral arsenic oxide (2:5); Arsenic anhydride

Identifiers
CAS Number	1303-28-2
3D model (JSmol)	Interactive image
ChemSpider	14088
ECHA InfoCard	100.013.743
EC Number	215-116-9
PubChem CID	14771
RTECS number	CG2275000
UNII	4GWL8T475I
UN number	1559
CompTox Dashboard (EPA)	DTXSID1034343
- InChI: InChI=1S/As2O5/c3-1(4)7-2(5)6 Key: COHDHYZHOPQOFD-UHFFFAOYSA-N; InChI=1/As2O5/c3-1(4)7-2(5)6 Key: COHDHYZHOPQOFD-UHFFFAOYAN
- SMILES: O=[As](=O)O[As](=O)=O

Properties
Chemical formula	As_{2}O_{5}
Molar mass	229.8402 g/mol
Appearance	white hygroscopic powder
Density	4.32 g/cm^{3}
Melting point	315 °C (599 °F; 588 K) (decomposes)
Solubility in water	59.5 g/100 mL (0 °C); 65.8 g/100 mL (20 °C); 8.20 g/100 mL (100 °C)
Solubility	soluble in alcohol
Acidity (pK_{a})	7

Hazards
- GHS labelling
Pictograms	(GHS06: Toxic) (GHS08: Health hazard) (GHS09: Environmental hazard)
Signal word	Danger
Hazard statements	H301, H331, H350, H410
Precautionary statements	P201, P202, P261, P264, P270, P271, P273, P281, P301+P310, P304+P340, P308+P313, P311, P321, P330, P391, P403+P233, P405, P501
NFPA 704 (fire diamond)	4 0 0
- Lethal dose or concentration (LD, LC)
LD_{50} (median dose)	8 mg/kg (rat, oral)
- NIOSH (US health exposure limits)
PEL (Permissible)	[1910.1018] TWA 0.010 mg/m^{3}
REL (Recommended)	Ca C 0.002 mg/m^{3} [15-minute]
IDLH (Immediate danger)	Ca [5 mg/m^{3} (as As)]

Related compounds
Other cations	Phosphorus pentoxide Antimony pentoxide
Related compounds	Arsenic trioxide Arsenic acid
- Except where otherwise noted, data are given for materials in their standard state (at 25 °C [77 °F], 100 kPa). verify (what is ?) Infobox references

Arsenic pentoxide is the inorganic compound with the formula As_{2}O_{5}. This glassy, white, deliquescent solid is relatively unstable, consistent with the rarity of the As(V) oxidation state. More common, and far more important commercially, is arsenic(III) oxide (As_{2}O_{3}). All inorganic arsenic compounds are highly toxic and thus find only limited commercial applications.

== Structure ==
The structure consists of tetrahedral {AsO_{4}} and octahedral {AsO_{6}} centers linked by sharing corners. The structure differs from that of the corresponding phosphorus(V) oxide; as a result, although there is still a solid solution with that oxide, it only progresses to the equimolar point, at which point phosphorus has substituted for arsenic in all of its tetrahedral sites. Likewise, arsenic pentoxide can also dissolve up to an equimolar amount of antimony pentoxide, as antimony substitutes for arsenic only in its octahedral sites.

As coordination	unit cell	cell packing

== Synthesis ==
=== Historical ===
Pierre Macquer found a crystallizable salt which he called "sel neutre arsenical". This salt was the residue obtained after distilling nitric acid from a mixture of potassium nitrate and arsenic trioxide. Previously Paracelsus heated a mixture of arsenic trioxide and potassium nitrate. He applied the term "arsenicum fixum" to the product. A. Libavius called the same product "butyrum arsenici" (butter of arsenic), although this term was actually used for arsenic trichloride. The products that Paracelsus and Libavius found were all impure alkali arsenates. Scheele prepared a number of arsenates by the action of arsenic acid on the alkalies. One of the arsenates that he prepared, was arsenic pentoxide. The water in the alkalies evaporated at 180˚C, and the arsenic pentoxide was stable below 400˚C.

=== Modern methods ===
Arsenic pentoxide can be crystallized by heating As_{2}O_{3} under oxygen. This reaction is reversible:

As_{2}O_{5} ⇌ As_{2}O_{3} + O_{2}

Strong oxidizing agents such as ozone, hydrogen peroxide, and nitric acid convert arsenic trioxide to the pentoxide.

Arsenic acid can be generated via routine processing of arsenic compounds including the oxidation of arsenic and arsenic-containing minerals in air. Illustrative is the roasting of orpiment, a typical arsenic sulfide ore:

2 As_{2}S_{3} + 11 O_{2} → 2 As_{2}O_{5} + 6 SO_{2}

== Safety ==
Like all inorganic arsenic compounds, the pentoxide is highly toxic. Its reduced derivative arsenite, which is an As(III) compound, is even more toxic since it has a high affinity for thiol groups of cysteine residues in proteins.

It is classified as an extremely hazardous substance in the United States as defined in Section 302 of the U.S. Emergency Planning and Community Right-to-Know Act (42 U.S.C. 11002), and is subject to strict reporting requirements by facilities which produce, store, or use it in significant quantities.
