= Hagedorn =

Hagedorn is a surname of German language origin, meaning "hawthorn". Notable people with the surname include:

- Bettina Hagedorn (born 1955), German politician
- Bob Hagedorn, US Democratic legislator from Colorado
- Brian Hagedorn, Wisconsin Judge
- Britt Hagedorn, German model and talk show host
- Edward Hagedorn (artist) (1902–1982), American artist
- Edward S. Hagedorn, mayor of the city Puerto Princesa in the Philippines
- Eric E. Hagedorn, American politician
- Erwin Hagedorn (1952–1972), German serial killer
- Friedrich Hagedorn, 19th-century German watercolorist
- Friedrich von Hagedorn, early 18th-century German poet
- Gregor Hagedorn (born 1965), German botanist
- Hans Christian Hagedorn, Danish biologist and pharmacologist with focus on insulin research
- Hermann Hagedorn (1882–1964), American author, poet and biographer
- Hermann Hagedorn (poet) (1884–1951), German poet
- Horace Hagedorn, American businessman and co-founder of the Miracle-Gro company
- Jessica Hagedorn, Filipino playwright, novelist, poet and musician living in New York
- Jim Hagedorn (1962–2022), American politician, member of the United States House of Representatives
- John Hagedorn, US associate professor of criminal justice
- Karl Hagedorn (1889–1969), German-born painter, naturalised British
- Karl Hagedorn (1922–2005), German-American painter
- Katherine Hagedorn (1961–2013), American academic
- Mary Hagedorn, US marine biologist
- Rolf Hagedorn, German physicist who spent most of his career at CERN in Geneva, Switzerland
- Thomas Hagedorn (born 1971), German entrepreneur
- Tom Hagedorn (born 1943), US politician
