= Lowitt =

Lowitt is a surname. Notable people with the surname include:

- Adam Lowitt, American standup comedian
- Richard Lowitt (1922–2018), American historian

== See also ==
- Lewitt
