= Titles of the Welsh Court =

Offices of State titles from the Middle Ages

Titles of the Welsh Court are the titles of the various Offices of State used in Wales during the Middle Ages. The roles of different officers changed over time, and these changes may reflect the political developments in the centuries before and after the death of Llywelyn ap Gruffudd in 1282. The Welsh title distain, being derived from "dish thane", indicates that he was originally concerned with the royal dishes at table, but it is known that Ednyfed Fychan, Distain to Llywelyn, was effectively a prime minister who did not regularly wait on the ruler at table. Below is a selection of the most important offices and titles:

== The Royal Family ==
- Brenin, meaning "King"
- Tywysog, meaning "Chief" or "Prince". A king was by default also a chief but a chief was not necessarily also a king. The title Tywysog is thought to share a common root with the Irish term Taoiseach.
- Edling, was a title designating the heir to the throne. This title was borrowed from the Old English title Æþeling meaning "royal son".

== Twelve Principal Officers of the Court ==
- Penteulu, literally meaning "household head" was the title given to the captain of the household troops or bodyguards. It was a position usually filled by a member of the royal family and one which conferred a responsibility on the bearer to defend the ruler; a feudal Minister of Defence.
- Offeiriad Teulu, literally "household priest", a senior religious advisor.
- Distain, meaning "steward" from the Old English term for "dish thane". Later this office name was replaced with the term Seneschal and came to be the principal diplomat and executive of the court: a feudal prime minister and foreign minister.
- Brawdwr Llys, meaning "court judge" — a senior legal officer who arbitrated on affairs of the realm; a feudal Minister of Justice.
- Penhebogydd, the chief falconer.
- Pencynydd, the chief huntsman (more literally "master of the hounds").
- Gwas Ystafell, the chamberlain.
- Bardd Teulu, the household bard.
- Drysor Neuadd, the doorkeeper of the royal hall, an honorific military rank.
- Drysor Ystafell, the doorkeeper of the royal chamber, another honorific military rank.
- Gwastrawd Afwyn, the groom of the rein.
- Meddyg, the court physician.
