= Schumann House =

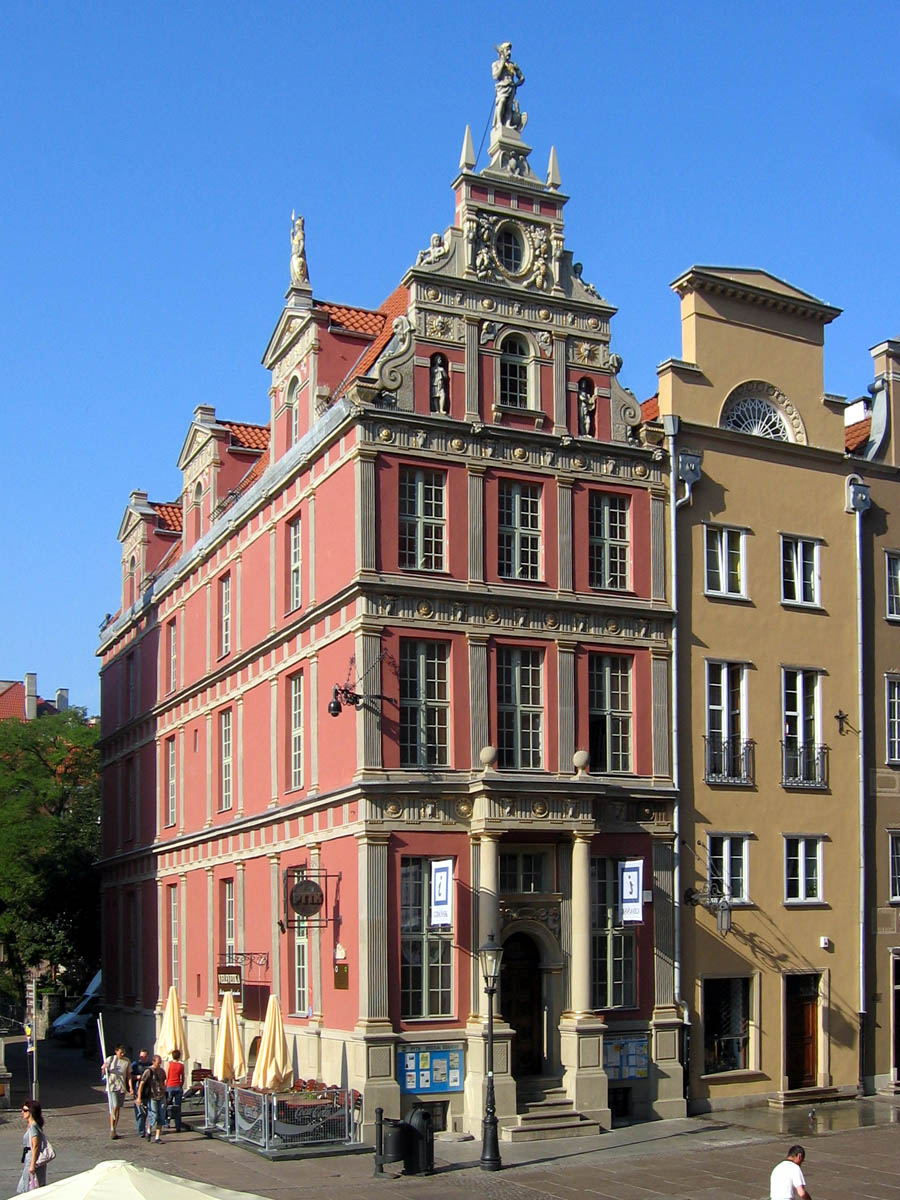
- The Schumann House in 2007

General information
- Architectural style: Renaissance
- Location: ul. Długa 45; Śródmieście, Gdańsk
- Coordinates: 54.3485°N 18.6529°E
- Completed: 1560
- Owner: Polish Tourist and Sightseeing Society

Technical details
- Floor count: 4

The Schumann House (Polish: Dom Schumannów) is a 16th-century Renaissance townhouse in Gdańsk, located on Długa Street in Główne Miasto. It is on the regional heritage list.

== Characteristics ==
The townhouse is located at ul. Długa 45, at its terminating point, where it meets the Długi Targ. It has four floors and a basement, with a brick construction and an exterior decoration of bas-reliefs carved in stone. Its façade, painted primarily in red, consists of four central pilasters. The gable is decorated with statues of Diana, Apollo, and Zeus. The portal is surrounded by a tall arcade. It today houses a Polish Tourist and Sightseeing Society-run visitor centre and a separate hotel.

== History ==
One of the earliest examples of Renaissance architecture in the city, the Schumann House was completed in 1560 for the wealthy Hans Conert. The townhouse's later owners included Hans Hoesfelke in 1608 and Engelbrecht Konig in 1616. In the mid-17th century, it was acquired by the Schumann family, a notable local family, 5 of whose members were mayors of Gdańsk. In 1878, its owner was the merchant Baum, and from 1896 onwards, its owners were Daniel Alert and his successors. It was rebuilt in 1912 to become a café, and in 1917, it was bought by the company Disconto Gesellschaft Danzig.

The house was almost entirely destroyed during the Siege of Danzig in 1945. It was rebuilt from 1950 to 1953 in accordance with old plans. After being rebuilt, it housed the local offices of the Polish Sightseeing Society (Polskie Towarzystwo Krajoznawcze), which would later become the Polish Tourist and Sightseeing Society.
