= Jenner (name) =

Jenner is a surname and given name.

Notable people with the name include:

== Surname ==
- Andrew Jenner, British-Australian politician
- Barry Jenner (1941–2016), American actor
- Blake Jenner (born 1992), American actor and singer
- Boone Jenner (born 1993), Canadian ice hockey player
- Brandon Jenner (born 1984), American reality TV star and musician
- Brody Jenner (born 1983), American reality TV star and model
- Caitlyn Jenner (born 1949), American decathlete
- Edward Jenner (1749–1823), English physician, developed the smallpox vaccine
- Frank Jenner (1903–1977), English Australian evangelist
- Greg Jenner (born 1982), British historian and author
- Gustav Jenner (1865–1920), German composer
- Helen Jenner (born 1988/1989), Welsh politician
- Henry Jenner (1848–1934), British historian and Cornish language expert
- Ivar Jenner (born 2004), Indonesian football player
- Jim Jenner, American politician
- Kendall Jenner (born 1995), American supermodel
- Kirby Jenner, performance artist
- Kitty Lee Jenner (1853–1936), British author
- Kris Jenner (born 1955), American television personality and socialite
- Kylie Jenner (born 1997), American reality TV star and business woman
- Leo Jenner (born 1989), Canadian athlete (see Plymouth Whalers)
- Michelle Jenner (born 1986), Spanish actress
- Peter Jenner (born 1943), English record producer
- Terry Jenner (1944–2011), Australian cricketer
- Timothy Jenner (born 1945), British air marshal
- Sir William Jenner, 1st Baronet (1815–1898), 19th-century English physician
- William E. Jenner (1908–1985), American politician
- William John Francis Jenner (born 1940), British sinologist

== Given name ==
- Jenner Armour (1932–2001), Dominican politician and barrister
- Jenner Zottele (born 1985), Brazilian professional footballer

== Fictional characters ==
- Edwin Jenner, in the US post-apocalyptic horror drama TV series The Walking Dead, played by Noah Emmerich
- Jenner, in the 1982 US animated fantasy adventure film The Secret of NIMH, voiced by Paul Shenar

== See also ==
- Jenner (disambiguation)
