= Friedrich Hagedorn =

German painter (c. 1814–1889)

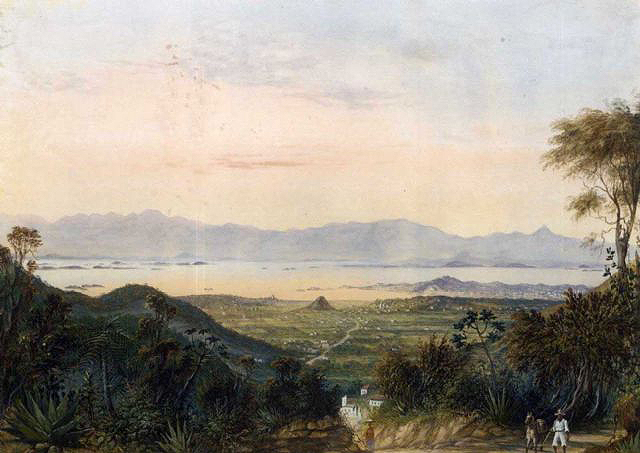
Panoramic view of Rio de Janeiro.

Friedrich Hagedorn (c. 1814–1889) was a German painter who was active in Brazil. After twenty years of residence in the country, he then returned to Germany, his homeland. His production was relatively plentiful and always attentive to the discovery of new landscapes. He was born and died in Germany.

== Biography ==
After having been a court painter in Lisbon between 1844 and 1847, he settled in Rio de Janeiro from 1848 to 1853, completing a group of German artists who have documented the landscape and the national customs, traveling to Pernambuco, São Paulo, Bahia and Minas Gerais. He immediately installed his atelier at Rua São José, nr. 12, and started painting. Later he moved to Rua do Teatro, nr. 17. He took part in the Exposição Geral de Belas-Artes in 1859–1860. He remained in Brazil for twenty years, working in Niterói, Petrópolis, Teresópolis, Juiz de Fora, Salvador and Recife. Although he found a good market for his productions, his presence seems to have been little noticed by the official circles and art critics of the time.

He worked specially with watercolor and tempera, and some of his landscapes were disseminated through Chromolithographs. His work is preserved mainly in the Hispanic Society of America, in New York, the National Library of Brazil, the Museu do Estado de Pernambuco, as well as in private collections.

== Gallery ==
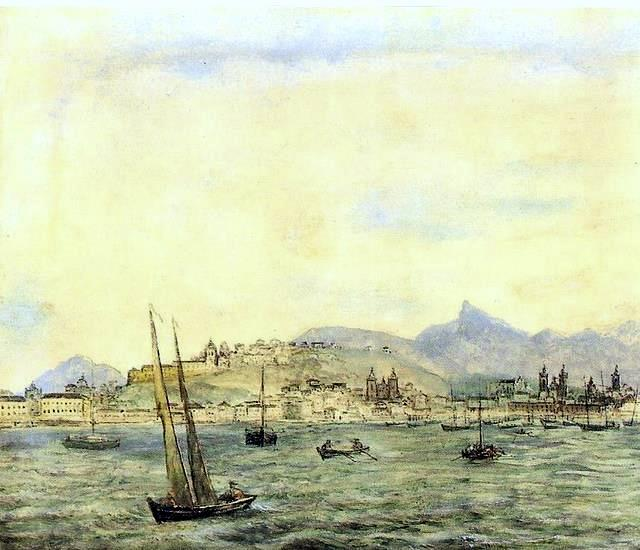
View of Rio de Janeiro I

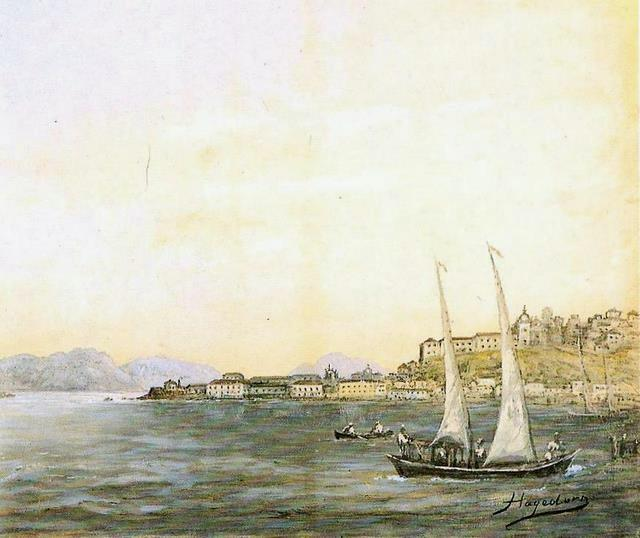
View of Rio de Janeiro II

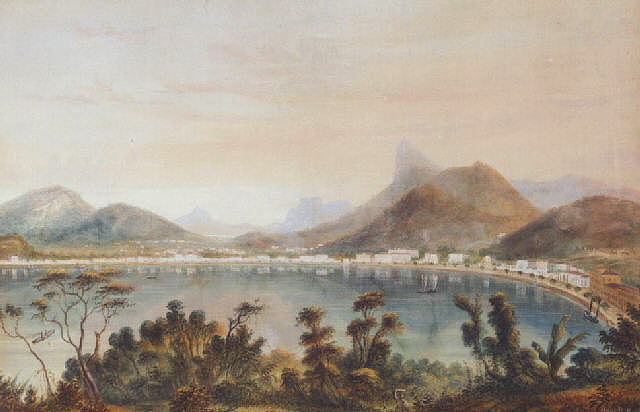
View of Rio de Janeiro. Watercolor.

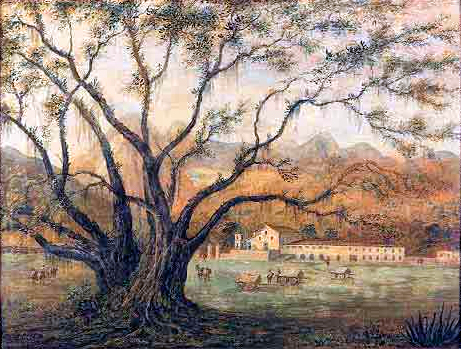
View of Correias farm

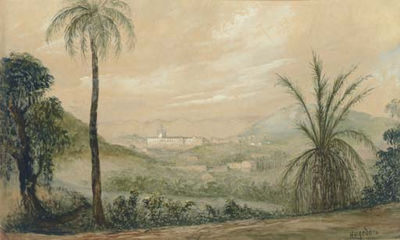
View of Santa Cruz farm

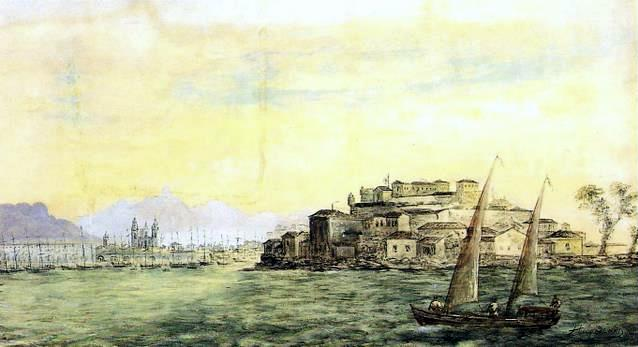
View of Rio de Janeiro. Gouache

== See also ==
- Emil Bauch
