= Lion Castle =

Townhouse in Gdańsk, Poland

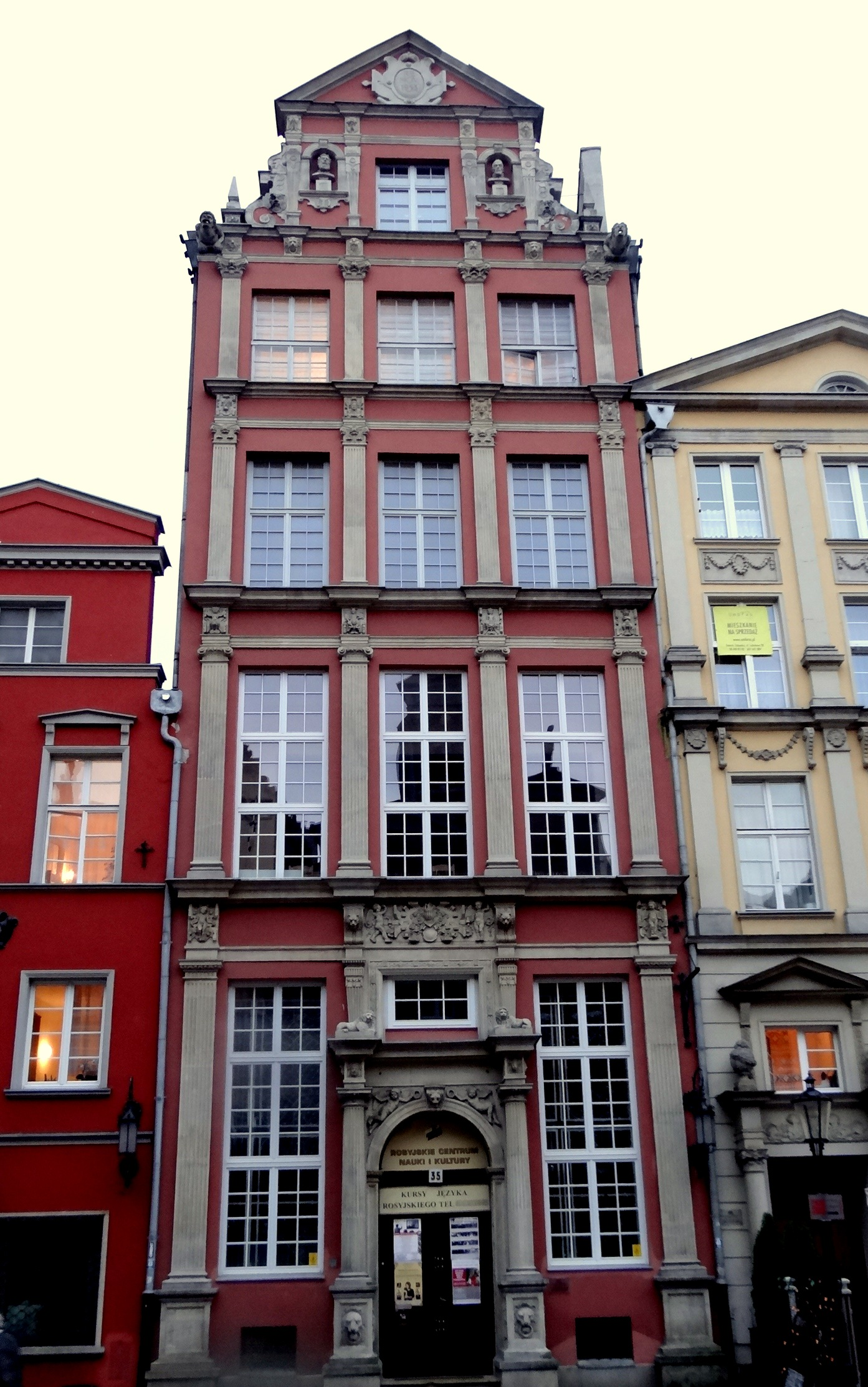
- The Lion Castle in 2013
- Interactive map of the Lion Castle area

General information
- Architectural style: Renaissance
- Location: 35 Long Street; Gdańsk, Poland
- Coordinates: 54.3488°N 18.6516°E
- Completed: 1569
- Owner: Gdańsk Miasto Literatury

Technical details
- Floor count: 4

Design and construction
- Architect: Hans Kramer

Historic Monument of Poland
- Designated: 1994-09-08
- Part of: Gdańsk – city within the 17th-century fortifications
- Reference no.: M.P. 1994 nr 50 poz. 415

The Lion Castle (Polish: Lwi Zamek; German: Löwenschloss) is a 16th-century Renaissance townhouse in Gdańsk, Poland, at 35 Long Street within the Śródmieście district. It is on the regional heritage list.

== Architecture ==
The Lion's Castle is built in a Renaissance style. It has four floors and a small attic. Its façade is bound pilasters in alternating appearances, appearing in both Doric, Ionic, and Corinthian orders. The main portal at the building's entrance is located along the centreline of the façade. The cornice is decorated with two lions, from which the townhouse's name is derived. The building's architecture also has strong influences from contemporary Dutch architecture.

== History ==
In 1411, Bartholomäus Gross, a city councillor and the owner of a house located on the modern site of the Lion's Castle, was murdered by the Teutonic Order, and the house shifted owners afterwards, eventually being completely rebuilt in 1569 under the oversight of Hans Kramer. Starting in 1615, the lay judge Heinrich Schwarzwald was its owner, passing it on to his descendants. Władysław IV Vasa stayed in the house during a visit to Danzig in 1636, and in the following cecnturies, the house more frequently changed owners.

In the late 19th century, the two distinctive lions on the cornice were installed, among other renovations and expansions. In 1945, the Lion's Castle was almost entirely destroyed and was rebuilt from 1950 to 1953 using old drawings and plans. The interior was initially occupied by the offices of the draughters of Miastoprojekt, a city design office, and, starting in the 1960s, it was home to the Polish–Soviet Friendship Society.

In 1996, the Russian Centre for Science and Culture started renting the Lion's Castle. The leasing agreement was extended in 2010, but following the start of the Russian invasion of Ukraine on 24 February 2022, the city of Gdańsk terminated the agreement due to the Centre's complicity in the inhumane actions against Ukraine.

On 27 February, animal blood was poured onto the portal to the building in protest, followed by black paint on 2 March. On 18 March, the Russian Centre for Culture and Science moved out of the building. The next occupant of the building was the cultural institution Gdańsk Miasto Literatury, which, with the help of Ukrainian artists and designers, opened its headquarters there on 4 November 2022.
