= Ætheling =

Anglo-Saxon term for a royal prince

An Ætheling (/ˈæθəlɪŋ/; also aetheling, atheling and etheling) was in Anglo-Saxon England a prince of the royal dynasty eligible for the kingship.

It is an Old English term (æþeling) derived from a compound of aethele, æþele or (a)ethel, meaning "noble family", and -ing, which means "belonging to". It was usually rendered in Latin as filius regis (king's son) or the Anglo-Latin neologism clito.

Ætheling can be found in the Suffolk toponym of Athelington.

== Meaning and use in Anglo-Saxon England ==
During the earliest years of the Anglo-Saxon rule in England, the word ætheling was probably used to denote any person of noble birth. Its use was soon restricted to members of a royal family. The prefix æþel- formed part of the name of several Anglo-Saxon kings, for instance Æthelberht of Kent, Æthelwulf of Wessex and Æthelred of Wessex, and was used to indicate their noble birth. According to a document which probably dates from the 10th century, the weregild of an ætheling was fixed at 15,000 thrymsas, or 11,250 shillings, which was equal to that of an archbishop and one-half of that of a king.

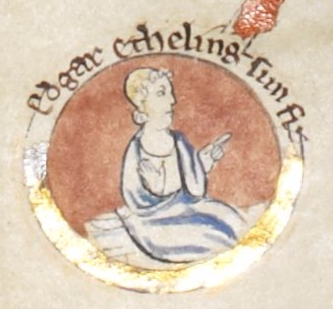
Edgar the Ætheling

The annal for 728 in the Anglo-Saxon Chronicle referred to a certain Oswald as an ætheling, due to his great-great-grandfather having been King of Wessex. From the 9th century, the term was used in a much narrower context and came to refer exclusively to members of the house of Cerdic of Wessex, the ruling dynasty of Wessex, most particularly the sons or brothers of the reigning king. According to historian Richard Abels, "King Alfred transformed the very principle of royal succession. Before Alfred, any nobleman who could claim royal descent, no matter how distant, could strive for the throne. After him, throne-worthiness would be limited to the sons and brothers of the reigning king." In the reign of Edward the Confessor, Edgar the Ætheling received the appellation as the grandson of Edmund Ironside, but that was at a time when for the first time in 250 years there was no living ætheling according to the strict definition.

Mention of æthelings in Beowulf

The first lines of Beowulf

"Hwæt! We Gardena in geardagum,
þeodcyninga, þrym gefrunon,
hu ða æþelingas ellen fremedon."

— Beowulf, lines 1-3

Ætheling was also used in a poetic sense to mean "a good and noble man". Old English verse often used ætheling to describe Christ, as well as various prophets and saints. The hero of the 8th century Beowulf is introduced as an ætheling, possibly in the sense of a relative of the King of the Geats, though some translators render ætheling as "retainer". Since many early Scandinavian kings were chosen by competition or election, rather than primogeniture, the term may have been reserved for a person qualified to compete for the kingship.

== Other uses and variations ==
The term was occasionally used after the Norman conquest of England and then only to designate members of the royal family. The Latinised Germanic form, Adelin(us) was used in the name of the only legitimate son and heir of Henry I of England, William Adelin, who drowned in the White Ship disaster of 1120.

It was also sometimes translated into Latin as clito, as in the name of William Clito. It may have been derived from the Latin inclitus/inclutus, "celebrated".

The historian Dáibhí Ó Cróinín has proposed that the idea of the rígdomna in early medieval Ireland was adopted from the Anglo-Saxon, specifically Northumbrian, concept of the ætheling. The earliest use of tanaíste ríg was in reference to an Anglo-Saxon prince in about 628. Many subsequent uses related to non-Irish rulers, before the term was attached to Irish kings-in-waiting.

In Wales, the variant edling was used to signify the son chosen to be the heir apparent.

== See also ==
- Aþel
- Ebeling
- Ethel
