= Remus (surname) =

Remus is the surname of:

- George Remus (1874–1952), American lawyer and bootlegger
- Jorge Matute Remus (1912–2002), Mexican engineer
- Robert Remus (born 1948), ring name Sgt. Slaughter, American semi-retired professional wrestler
- Romola Remus (1900–1987), American actress best known for being the first to play Dorothy Gale onscreen
- Ute Remus (born 1941), German actress, radio reader, presenter, and editor, and a writer
