= Ferber House =

Building in Śródmieście, Gdańsk, Poland

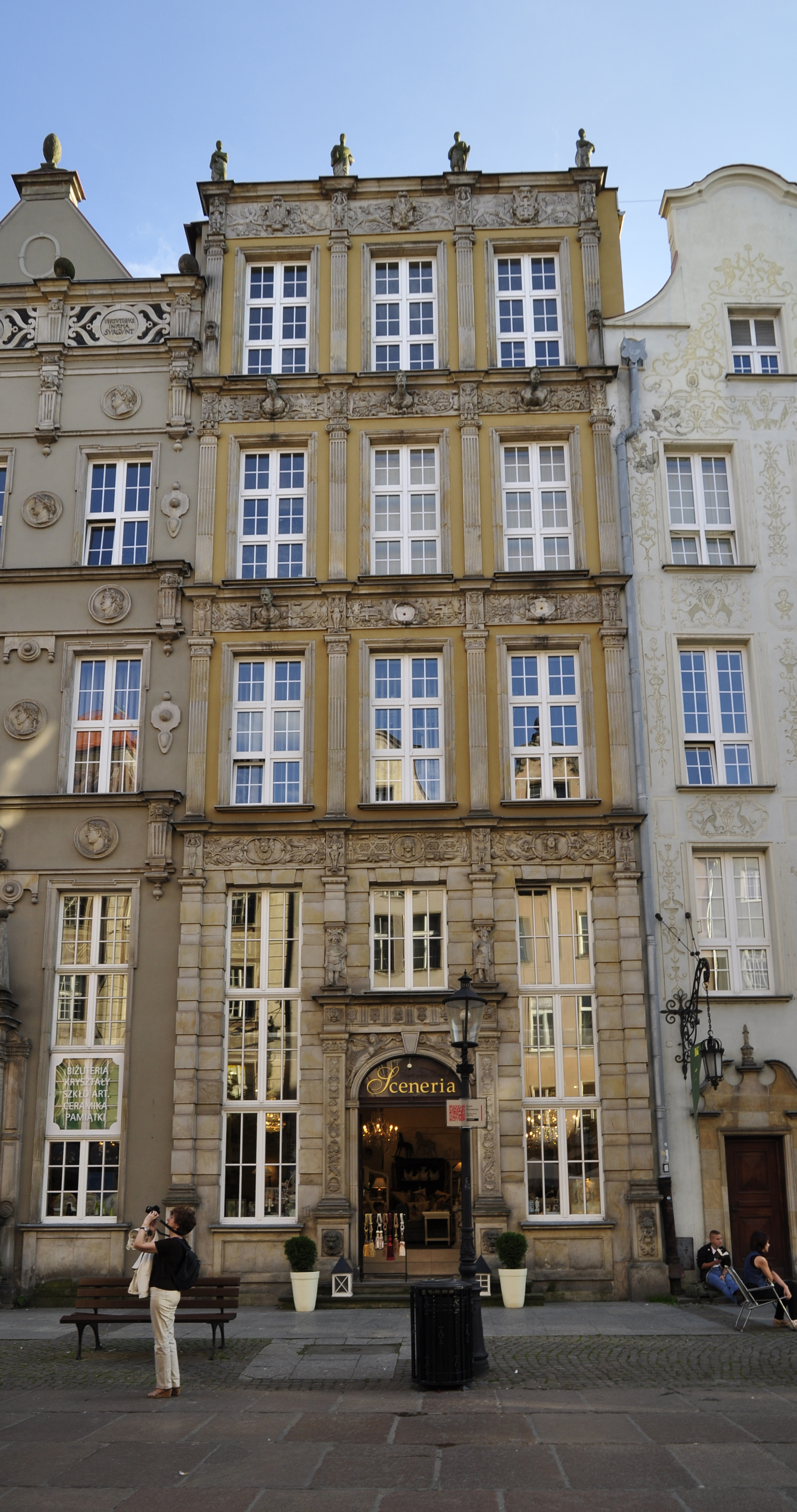
- Ferber House in 2012

General information
- Architectural style: Renaissance
- Location: Długa Street 28; Śródmieście, Gdańsk
- Coordinates: 54.3488°N 18.6512°E
- Completed: 1560

Technical details
- Floor count: 5

Historic Monument of Poland
- Designated: 1994-09-08
- Part of: Gdańsk – city within the 17th-century fortifications
- Reference no.: M.P. 1994 nr 50 poz. 415

The Ferber House (Polish: Dom Ferberów), also known as the Adam and Eve Townhouse (Kamienica Adam i Ewa), is a 16th-century townhouse located on Długa Street in Gdańsk, Poland. It is on the regional heritage list.

== Characteristics ==
The Ferber House is located at Długa Street 28. Built in a Renaissance style, it has five floors and is built of bricks, though its ceiling is built of reinforced concrete. A variety of friezes decorate the exterior between windows, with themes primarily focused on nature; the topmost frieze depicts the coats of arms of the Kingdom of Poland, the province of Royal Prussia, and Gdańsk. Its doors were once decorated with scenes of the fall of man and the exile of Adam and Eve from the Garden of Eden; its alternative name is derived from these scenes. The decorations were removed because of a perceived demonic character.

== History ==
The Ferber House was built by mayor Constantin Ferber I, a member of the wealthy Ferber family, in 1560. Constantin played a significant role in the Danzig rebellion of 1577. The Ferber family owned the home until the death of its last member in 1786.

A notable legend surrounding the Ferber House involves a nanny holding a child of the wealthy Ferber family during a royal parade through the city of Danzig. When the nanny saw an attractive young man from among the parade, she was distracted and allowed the child to slip from her grasp and land in a basket of cabbage. The epitaph of the Ferbers in St. Mary's Church is thus decorated with an image of a falling child. Another version of the myth does not involve a nanny, and identifies the child as Constantin, who leans out of a window and falls into a basket of fish instead. A further elaboration of the myth states that the fish basket was carried by a Kashubian fisherman.

After the Ferber surname went extinct, the house was owned by the Franzius family until 1805 and the Steffens family from 1805 to 1879. Due to the house being largely uninhabited, many myths emerged including that the house was haunted. The Ferber House was severely damaged in 1945 and rebuilt from 1951 to 1954; as of 2017 it houses a souvenir shop.
