= Edling =

Former title for the Welsh heir apparent

Edling (Welsh: etifedd) was a title given to the agreed successor or heir apparent of a reigning Welsh monarch. It is related to the English term Æþeling.

While Æþeling or "noble child" (for example, see Edgar the Ætheling) was used in Anglo-Saxon England before the Norman Conquest to denote one of "royal blood", the Welsh use had a more precise meaning and denoted the acknowledged heir to the throne, usually the ruler's eldest son, although any son (legitimate or illegitimate) could be chosen as edling.

In 1923, the academic T. H. Parry-Williams identified the title as being borrowed from Old English. However, David Dumville has argued that the term may have been borrowed at a later date from Middle English.

The term has been used in Welsh poetry, including by Iolo Goch when praising Roger Mortimer as heir to Richard II.

== See also ==
- Titles of the Welsh Court
