= Golden Gate (Gdańsk) =

City gate Gdańsk, Poland

- Brama Złota
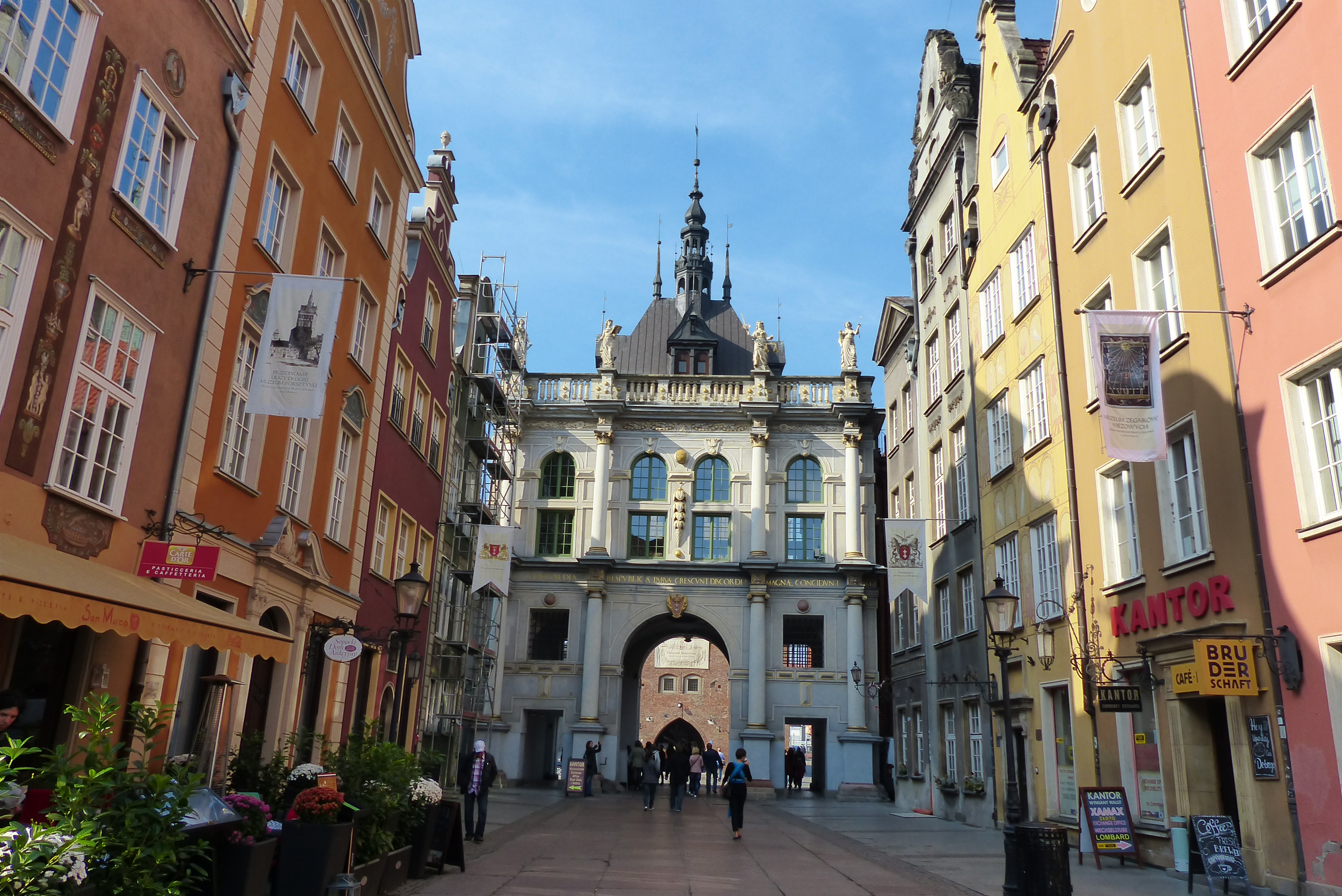
- Golden Gate, east side, in 2015.

- Location within Poland

General information
- Type: City gate
- Architectural style: Dutch Mannerism
- Location: Ulica Długa (Long Lane), Gdańsk, Poland
- Coordinates: 54°20′59″N 18°38′53″E
- Construction started: 1612
- Completed: 1614

Design and construction
- Architect: Abraham van den Blocke

Historic Monument of Poland
- Designated: 1994-09-08
- Part of: Gdańsk – city within the 17th-century fortifications
- Reference no.: M.P. 1994 nr 50 poz. 415

The Golden Gate (Polish: Brama Złota, German: Langgasser Tor) is a historic Renaissance city gate in Gdańsk, Poland. It is located within the Royal Route, the most prominent part of the Old Town and is one of its most notable tourist attractions.

== History ==
It was created in 1612–14 in place of a 13th-century Gothic gate, the Brama Długouliczna (Long Street Gate). It is located at one end of Ulica Długa (Long Lane), where, together with Brama Wyżynna (Highland Gate) and Wieża Więzienna (Prison Tower), it forms a part of the old city fortifications.

== Architecture ==
The present gate was designed by architect Abraham van den Blocke and built by Jan Strakowski. The architectural style of the gate is Dutch Mannerism. Next to it is the late-Gothic building of the Brotherhood of St. George.

Both sides of the gate have attiques, with figures symbolizing the qualities of the ideal citizen. They were designed in 1648 by Jeremias Falck ("Polonus"), and reconstructed in 1878 due to the originals being damaged by weathering over time.

From the west side they represent (in Latin): Pax (Peace), Libertas (Freedom), Fortuna (Wealth) and Fama (Fame). From the east (Long Lane) side they are Concordia (Agreement), Iustitia (Justice), Pietas (Piety) and Prudentia (Prudency). The Latin inscription on the gates reads: Concordia res publicæ parvæ crescunt – discordia magnæ concidunt ("In agreement small republics grow, because of disagreement great republics fall").

The gate was damaged by Soviet shelling in World War II, but escaped destruction. It was repaired in 1957. An original German inscription on the gate was restored in the 1990s: Es müsse wohl gehen denen, die dich lieben. Es müsse Friede sein inwendig in deinen Mauern und Glück in deinen Palästen ("They shall prosper that love thee. Peace be within thy walls, and prosperity within thy palaces". – Psalm 122).

== Gallery ==
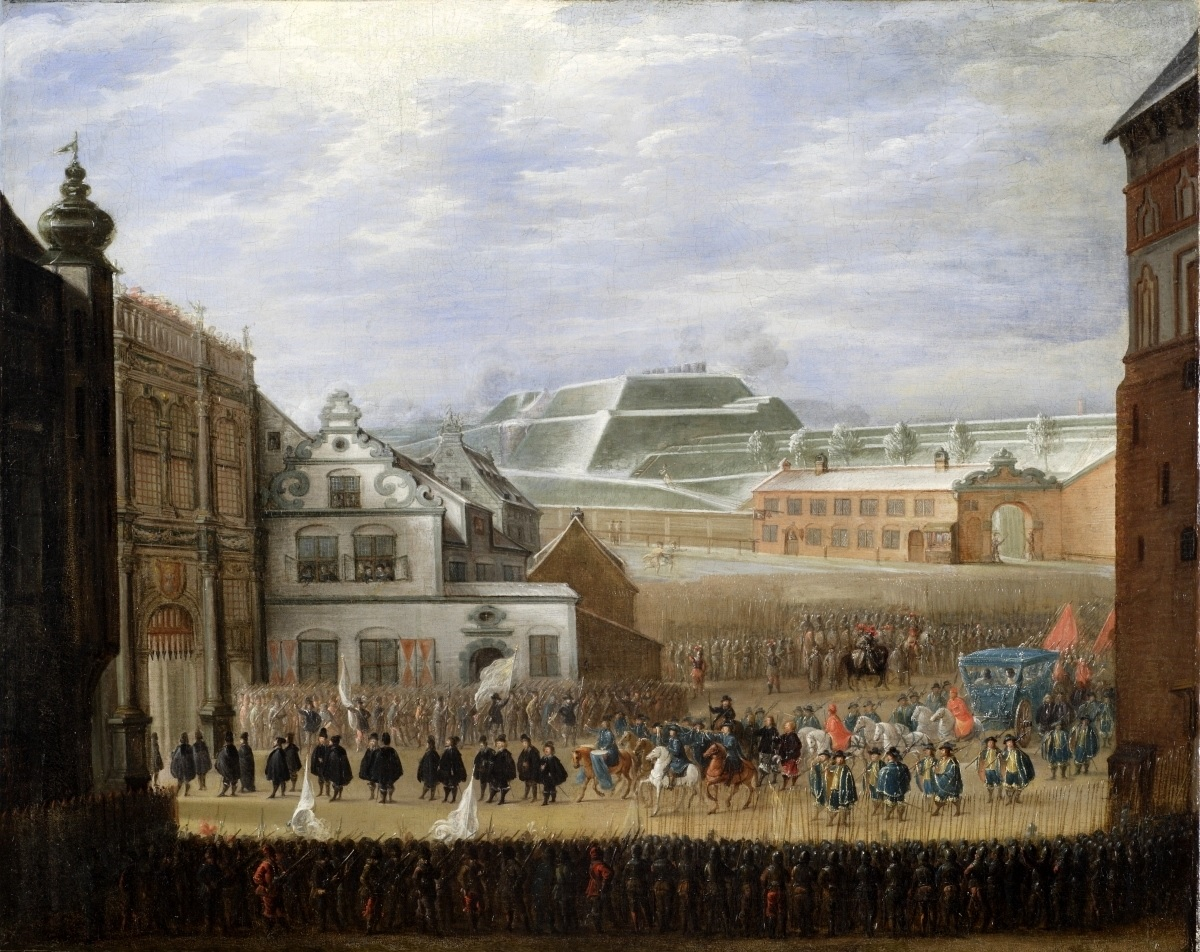
Entry of Marie Louise Gonzaga, Queen of Poland, c. 1646.

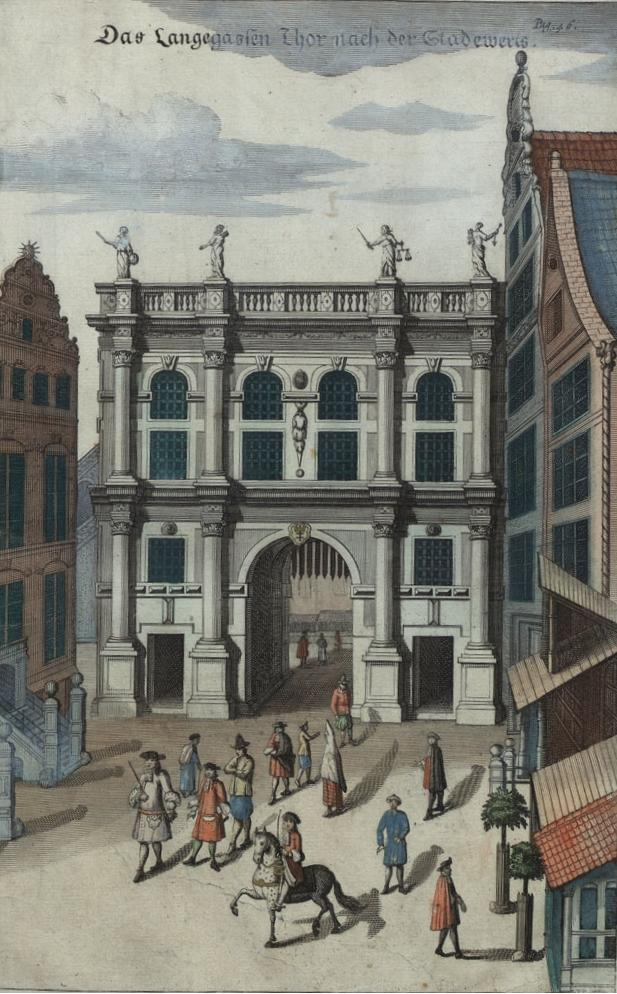
The Langgasser Tor in 1687, published by Reinhold Curicke.

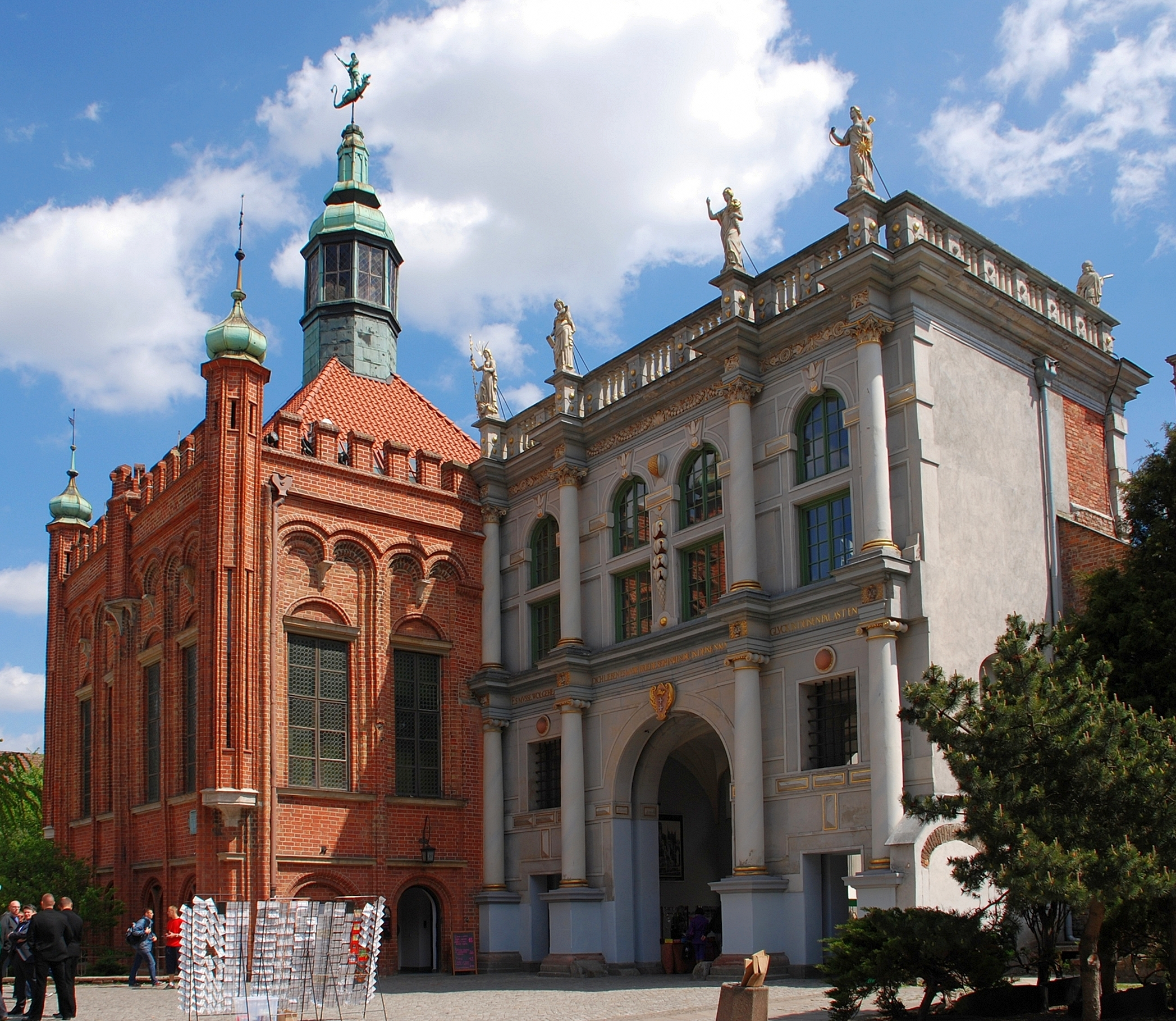
The gate (right) and the seat of St. George's Brotherhood (left).

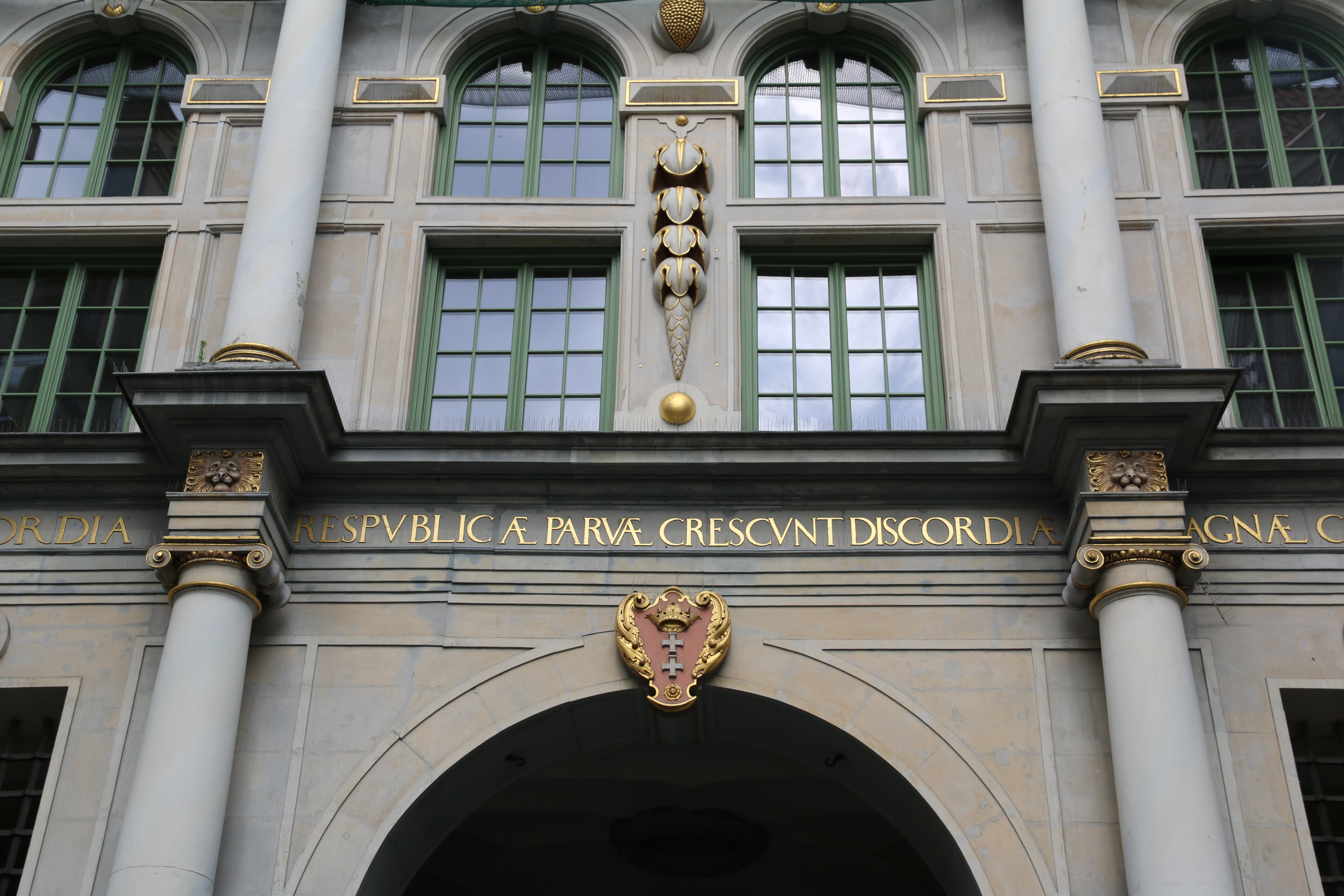
Architectural detail of the gate, with gilded inscriptions.
