= Długa Street, Gdańsk =

Street in Gdańsk, Poland

Coordinates: 54.3497°N 18.6482°E

Długa Street
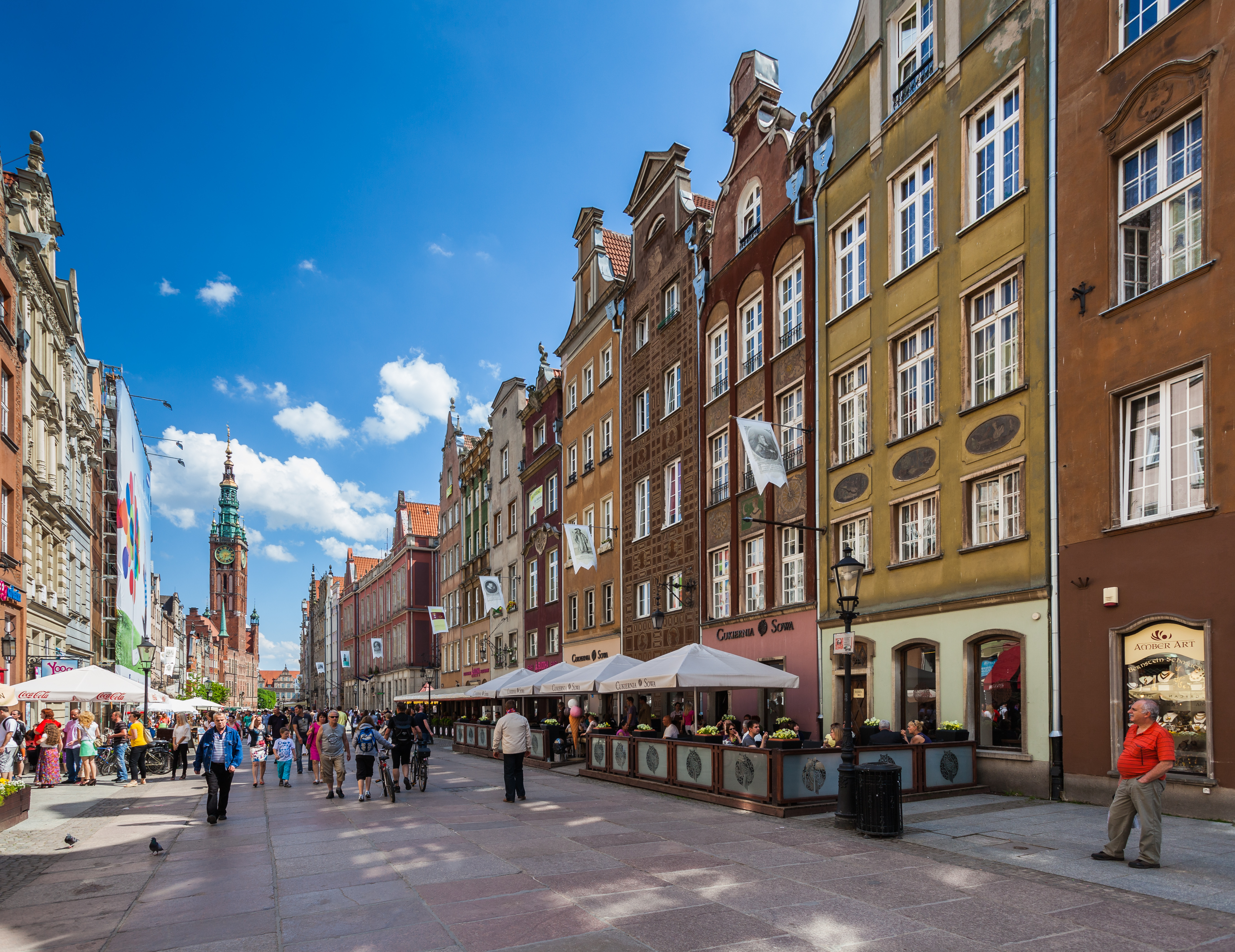
- Ulica Długa in Gdańsk

- Location within Poland
- Native name: ulica Długa (Polish)
- Length: 320 m (1,050 ft)
- Location: Gdańsk, Poland

Construction
- Commissioned: 13th century

Historic Monument of Poland
- Designated: 1994-09-08
- Part of: Gdańsk – city within the 17th-century fortifications
- Reference no.: M.P. 1994 nr 50 poz. 415

Długa Street (Polish: ulica Długa; German: Langgasse), known as the Long Lane, is one of the most notable tourist attractions in the city of Gdańsk, in northern Poland. It leads from the Golden Gate (Złota Brama) to the Długi Targ (Long Market), and the Green Gate (Brama Zielona), and forms part of the Royal Route, the most prominent part of the historic city center and is one of its most notable tourist attractions.

== Buildings ==
- Ferber House
- Schumann House
- Uphagen House
- Lion Castle
