= Lobeck =

Lobeck may refer to:

== People ==
- Anne Lobeck, American linguist
- Armin K. Lobeck (1886–1958), American cartographer, geomorphologist and landscape artist
- Charles O. Lobeck (1852–1920), Nebraska politician
- Christian Lobeck (1781–1860), German classical scholar
- Engebret E. Lobeck (1864–1922), Norwegian-American politician
- Florian Lobeck (1816–1869), German naturalist

== Other ==
- Lobeck Glacier, part of the crescent-shaped Antarctic Saint Johns Range

== See also ==
- Lobeč, a Czech municipality and village
- Lübeck, a city in Northern Germany
