= Jenner =

Jenner may refer to:

- Jenner (name), a list of people with the surname or given name

== United States ==
- Jenner, California
- Jenner Township, Somerset County, Pennsylvania
  - Jenners, Pennsylvania
- Jenner & Block, a law firm

== Elsewhere ==
- Jenner (mountain), Bavaria, Germany
- Jenner (crater), on the far side of the Moon
- Jenner, Alberta, Canada
- Jenners, a department store in Edinburgh, Scotland
