= Witkop =

Witkop is a surname. Notable people with the surname include:

- Bernhard Witkop (1917–2010), German-American chemist
- Milly Witkop (1877–1955), Ukrainian-born anarchist
- Rose Witcop (1890–1932), Ukrainian-born anarchist
