= Sachtleben =

Sachtleben is a surname. Notable people with the surname include:

- Bethany Sachtleben (born 1992), American long-distance runner
- Horst Sachtleben (1930–2022), German actor and director
- William Sachtleben (1866–1953), American journalist and activist
