= Mark Serrurier =

Mark Serrurier (12 May 1904 in Pasadena, California – 14 February 1988) was an American engineer and inventor. He was the son of Dutch-born electrical engineer, Iwan Serrurier, who created the Moviola in 1924 which became the technology used for film editing. Mark was a graduate of Caltech and went on to work on designs for the Palomar Observatory 200 inch (5 m) Hale Telescope. The pioneering truss design he invented for that instrument's massive tube structure (the "Serrurier truss") is still used today in large telescope designs. During World War II, Mark worked at the Jet Propulsion Laboratory testing jet aircraft engines.

After the war in 1946 Mark took over as president of Moviola Co., his father Iwan's company. Mark re-designed his father's invention with many improvements and ran the company until he sold it in 1966. In 1979, Mark accepted a special Academy Award for Technical Achievement" For the progressive development of the Moviola from the 1924 invention of his father, Iwan Serrurier, to the present Series 20 sophisticated film editing equipment". He only accepted after insisting that his late father's name would also appear on the statue. The Oscar sat on Mark's kitchen table until his death from Alzheimer's disease on Valentine's Day 1988.

Mark Serrurier has a star on the Hollywood Walk of Fame for his contributions in Motion Pictures.

== External ==
- "INDUSTRY MOURNS ENTREPRENEUR MARK SERRURIER"
- Mark SERRURIER / Guillaume BLANCHARD • l'Astronomie (1980–2006) Vol. 116 (Janvier 2002) page 20-23
