= Glaubicz coat of arms =

Polish coat of arms

Glaubicz
- Alternative names: Carpio, Glajbicz, Glaubitz, Glubos, Gluboz, Gloubus, Glawbz, Karp
- Earliest mention: 1326, 1451
- Families: Bracławski, Garwoliński, Glaubicz, Glaubsowicz, Głowbicz, Goniewski, Gostkowski, Menstwiłł, Mudrejko, Okuniewski, Pianocki, Pianowski, Płonczyk, Płonczyński, Przecławski, Przełaski, Przeborowski, Przuławski, Przybiński, Rokassowski, Rokosowski, Rokossowski, Sabinek, Sabinka, Sabiński, Sawin, Wyszegrodzki

Glaubicz is a Polish coat of arms.

== See also ==
- Polish heraldry
- Heraldic family
- List of Polish nobility coats of arms

== Bibliography ==
- Nieznana szlachta polska i jej herby - Wiktor Wittyg
