= Ute Remus =

German actress, radio reader, presenter, and editor, writer

Ute Remus (born 1941) is a German actress, radio reader, presenter, and editor, as well as a writer.

== Books ==
- 2004: Sollst je du sollst du Schwänin auf dem Ozean. Hommage an Lou Straus-Ernst (Note: "Sollst je du sollst du Schwänin auf dem Ozean" is a line from the poem "Armada Duldgedalzen" (1920) by Johannes Theodor Baargeld. Armada von Duldgedalzen was an alias of Luise Straus) ("Should you ever be, should you be a swan on the ocean. A trubute to Luise Straus-Ernst"), ISBN 3-932050-23-1
- 2013: Bloß nicht auf Sand bauen, autobiographical novel
- 2014: Mit dem Buch im Gepäck

== Awards ==
- 1976: Kurt Magnus Prize for young broadcasters
- 1989: Civis Media Prize for special program "Alltagskonflikte - Mit so einem gehst Du? Deutsch-türkische Liebe"
