= Ben Lewitt =

English rugby union player

Ben Lewitt born 23 October 1978 (age 47) in Leamington Spa, England is a rugby union player currently playing for the Bedford Blues in the Aviva Championship. He left the Northampton Saints at the end of the 2008–09 Guinness Premiership.

He played over 70 games for the Saints, including the quarter-final and semi-final of Northampton Saints' 2006–07 Heineken Cup run which saw them beat Biarritz Olympique in the Quarter-Final in San Sebastian before losing the Semi-Final to previous winners London Wasps at the Ricoh Arena in Coventry.

He plays at flanker. He is 6'3" tall and weighs 105 kg

Ben's previous clubs include the Leicester Tigers, Orrell R.U.F.C. and Coventry R.F.C. He has also represented the England Sevens where he went to the 2006 Commonwealth Games and has previously represented the England Students.

Ben briefly worked in the family brewing business The Warwickshire Beer Company, where some of their beers hold awards from Campaign for Real Ale. One of their best sellers is called 'Darling Buds' a 4% golden ale.

He is now a director & Athlete Manager at Green Room Sports Management.

He attended Princethorpe between the years 1990–1995.
