= Van Heemskerk =

Van Heemskerk is a Dutch surname. Notable people with the surname include:

- Jacob van Heemskerk (1567–1607), Dutch explorer and naval admiral
- Johan van Heemskerk (1597–1656), Dutch poet
