= Hagemeister =

Hagemeister is a German surname. Notable people with the surname include:

- Charles C. Hagemeister (1946–2021), United States Army officer and Medal of Honor recipient
- Henry F. Hagemeister (1855–1915), American politician
- Karl Hagemeister (1848–1933), German landscape painter
- Ludwig von Hagemeister (1780–1833), Imperial Russian explorer
- Michael Hagemeister (born 1951), German scholar, historian and Slavist

== See also ==
- Hagemeister Island, Alaska, United States
- Hagemeister Park, Wisconsin, United States
