= Thomas Hagedorn =

German entrepreneur and founder of Hagedorn Group

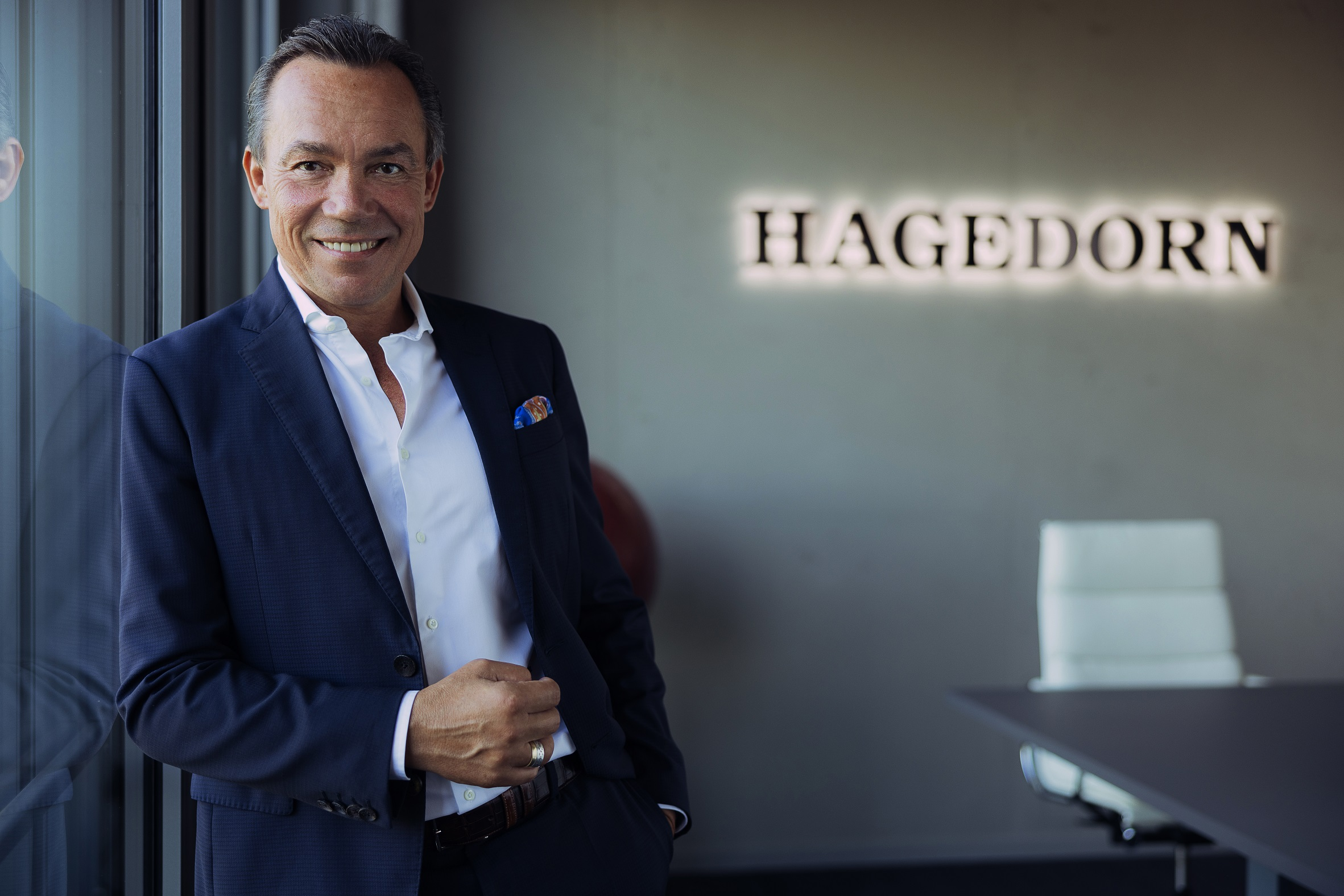
- Thomas Hagedorn
- Born: May 11, 1971 (age 54)
- Occupation: entrepreneur
- Years active: 1996 until today
- Known for: Founder and managing director of Hagedorn Group
- Children: two

Thomas Hagedorn (born May 11, 1971) is a German entrepreneur, founder and managing director of Hagedorn Group in Gütersloh.

== Life ==
Hagedorn grew up in Gütersloh. Thomas Hagedorn has two children.

== Career ==
After working as a locksmith, truck driver, engine operator, foreman and site manager, Hagedorn founded his own company in 1997 in Gütersloh. He bought a small building yard in Freckenhorst and started with demolishing houses. In 2002, Hagedorn bought a 10,000 square metres (110,000 sq ft) area at the Werner-von-Siemens-Strasse between Gütersloh and Bielefeld, that still holds the headquarter and some facilities of the company.

In 2006, Hagedorn founded the Gütersloher Wertstoffzentrum GmbH that recycles building rubble, followed by the Erdbau- und -erschließungs GmbH for civil engineering in Oktober 2011. 2013 the Revital GmbH was founded, which focuses on the restructuring of brownfields. In 2016, the Hagedorn group launched their online-platform Brownfield24, which connects sellers and byers of industrial and commercial brownfields. Another start-up called Schüttflix was founded in 2019, an online-platform that provides an app for ordering bulk material.

Today, the Hagedorn Group is a company with over 500 employees, specialised in the fields of demolition, restructuring, disposal and recycling of building rubble, as well as civil engineering and restructuring of brownfields. The Hagedorn Group holds a total of around 39 individual companies.

== Recognition and Philanthropy ==
Hagedorn criticized in the largest German newspaper Bild that nobody was prepared to become an excavator driver any more. Shortly after the article was published, the company received more than 250 applications.

Hagedorn is the sponsor of the local football club FC Gütersloh and is a partner and fan of the Bundesliga football club FC Schalke 04. He also supports several initiatives founded by him. For example, "Einfach Fußball", which enables handicapped children and young people to play football or "MIThelfen", in which Hagedorn employees work together in social projects.

== Awards ==
- 2015: Sandvik Customer Innovation Award

== See also ==
- Hagedorn Unternehmensgruppe (German Wikipedia)
- Gütersloh
