= Hohenstein =

Hohenstein may refer to:

== People ==
- Adolfo Hohenstein (1854–1928), German painter, advertiser, illustrator
- Kurt Hohenstein (born 1955), American politician from Nebraska, history professor
- Wes Hohenstein, American television meteorologist

== Places ==
- Hohenstein (Reutlingen), a municipality in Baden-Württemberg, Germany
- Hohenstein (Strausberg), a civil parish of Strausberg, Brandenburg, Germany
- Hohenstein, Hesse, Germany
- Hohenstein, Thuringia, Germany
- Hohenstein Castle, Bavaria, Germany
- Hohenstein-Ernstthal, Saxony, Germany
- Olsztynek, Poland, called Hohenstein in German
- Pszczółki, Pomeranian Voivodeship, Poland, called Hohenstein in German
- Sayn-Wittgenstein-Hohenstein, a county of the Holy Roman Empire (1657–1806)

== Other uses ==
- Hohenstein Institute
