= Uphagen's House =

Coordinates: 54°20′57″N 18°38′25″E

- Dom Uphagena
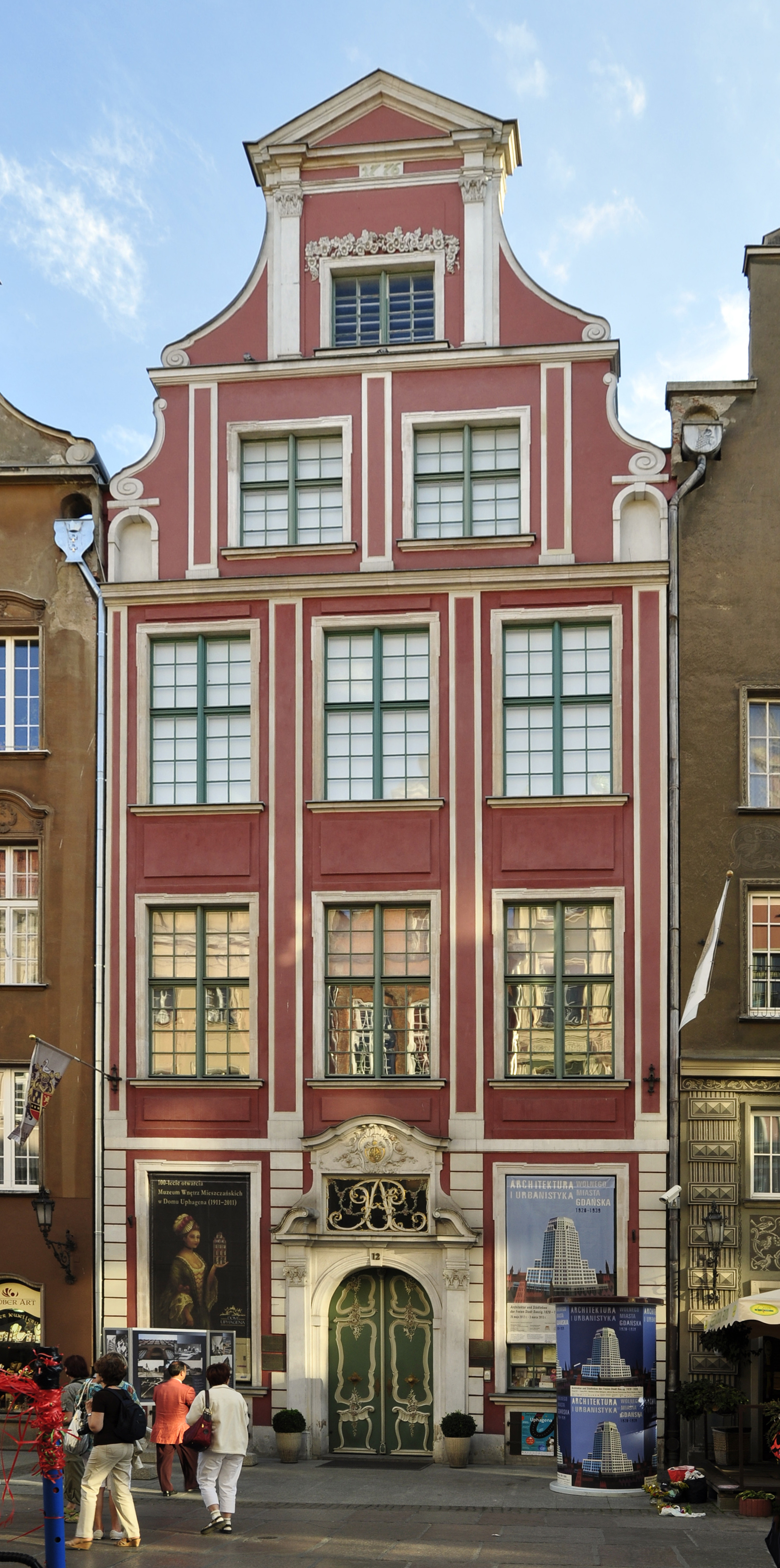
- Front façade
- Interactive map of the Uphagen's House area

General information
- Type: Townhouse
- Architectural style: Baroque
- Location: Gdańsk, Poland
- Historical Museum of the City of Gdańsk

The Uphagen House (Polish: Dom Uphagena, German: Uphagen-Haus) is a reconstructed 18th-century merchant house in Gdańsk, Poland, located at the Ulica Długa (Long Lane) within the Royal Route in the historic Main City. It houses a museum, which is a branch of the local historical museum (Muzeum Gdańska). The Uphagen house is one of only a few 18th-century merchant town houses in Europe that are open to visitors.

== History ==
The Uphagen house was purchased in 1775 by Johann Uphagen, a merchant, historian, art collector and city councilor. He remodeled it to suit the needs of a wealthy 18th century merchant. After Uphagen's death in 1802, the house was passed down through several generations of the Uphagen family.

In 1911 the Uphagen house was converted into a museum, which it remained until 1944. In that year, German curators of the house evacuated the furniture to Kartuzy and Gorzędziej. Though some parts of these interiors were destroyed at the end of World War II, some original parts returned in the early 1950s.

The Uphagen House was destroyed during the Soviet advance into Danzig in 1945. The house was rebuilt after World War II. It was finally reopened to visitors in 1998.

== Gallery ==
Interior of the Uphagen House

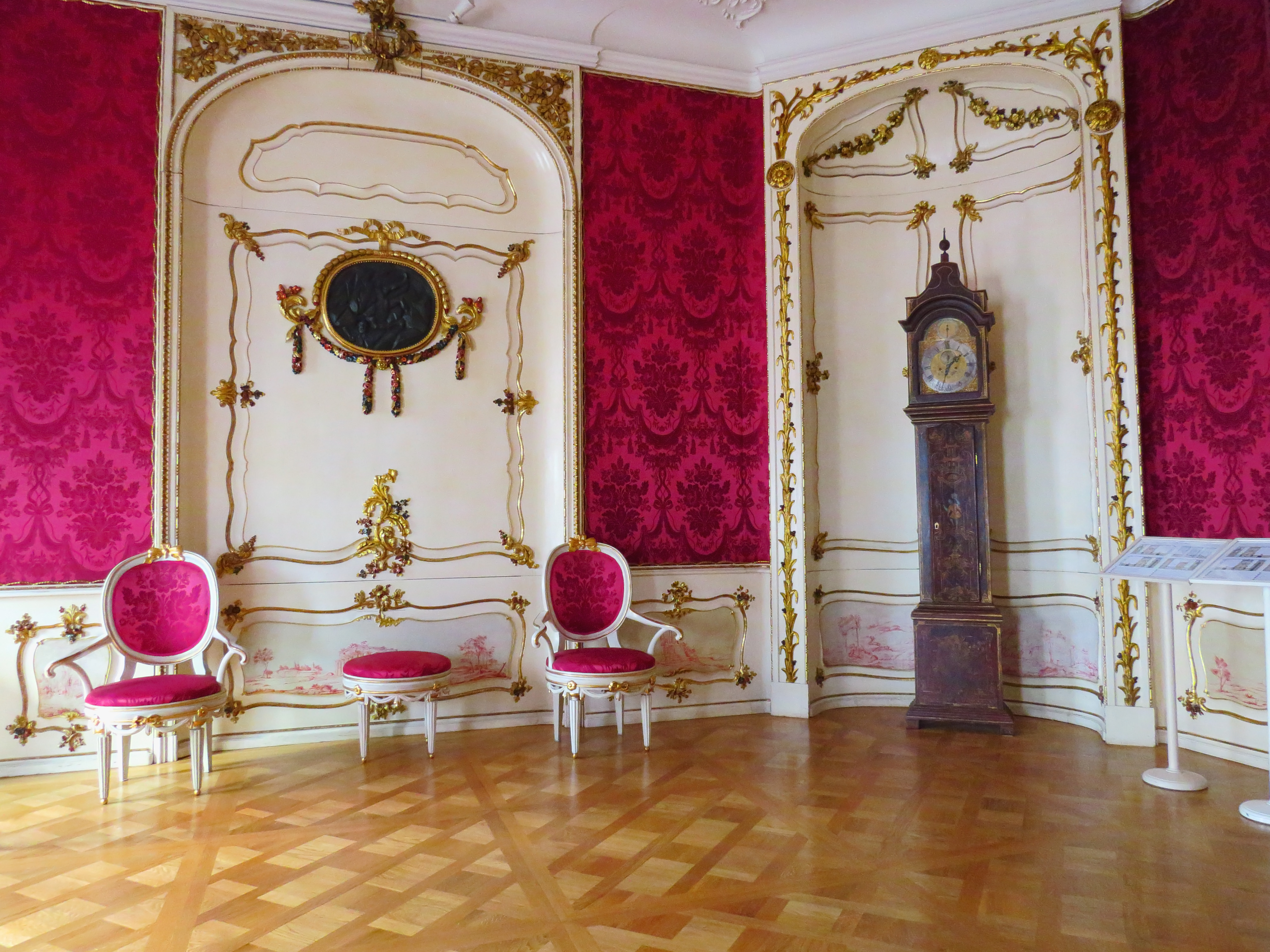

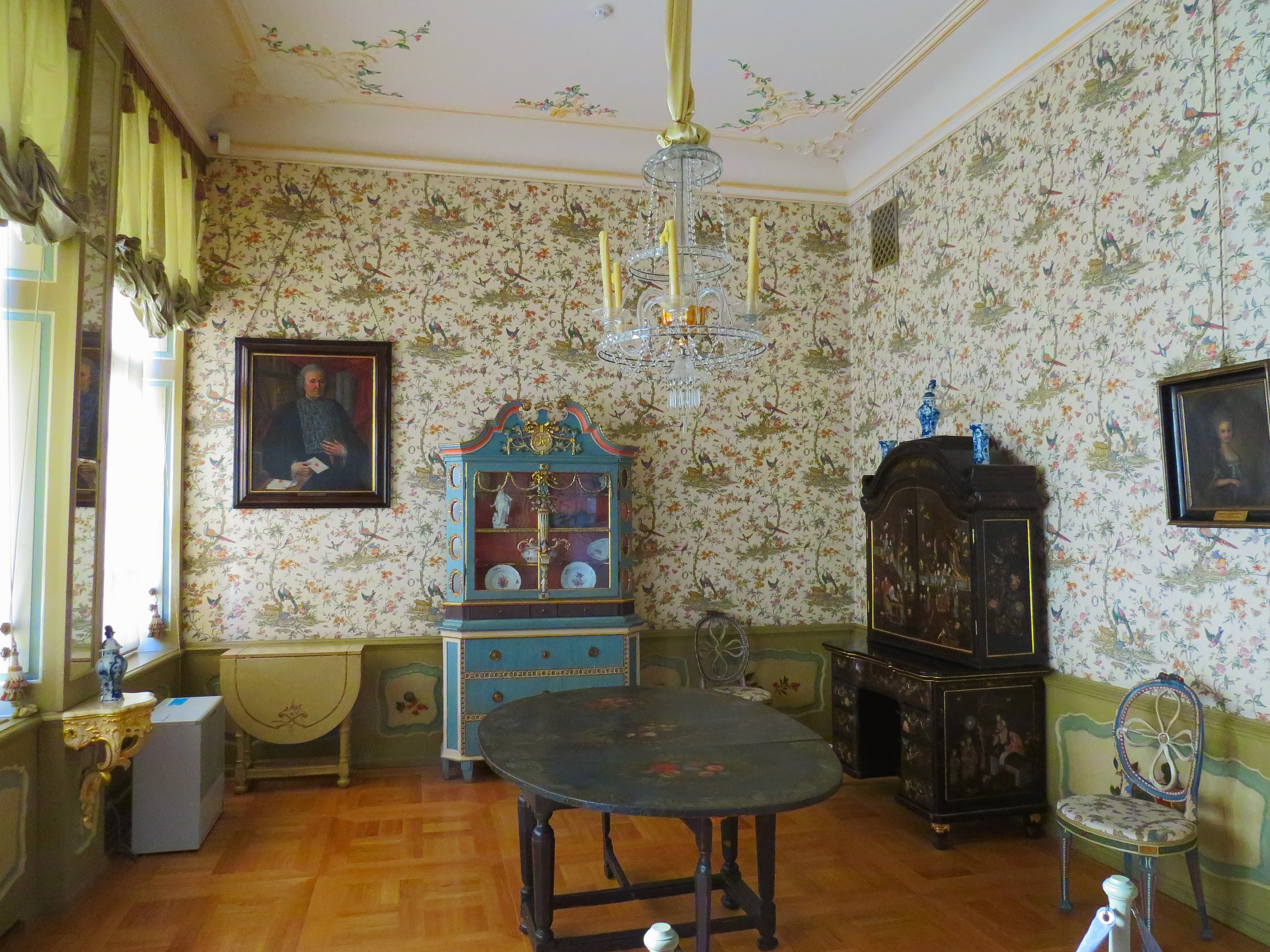

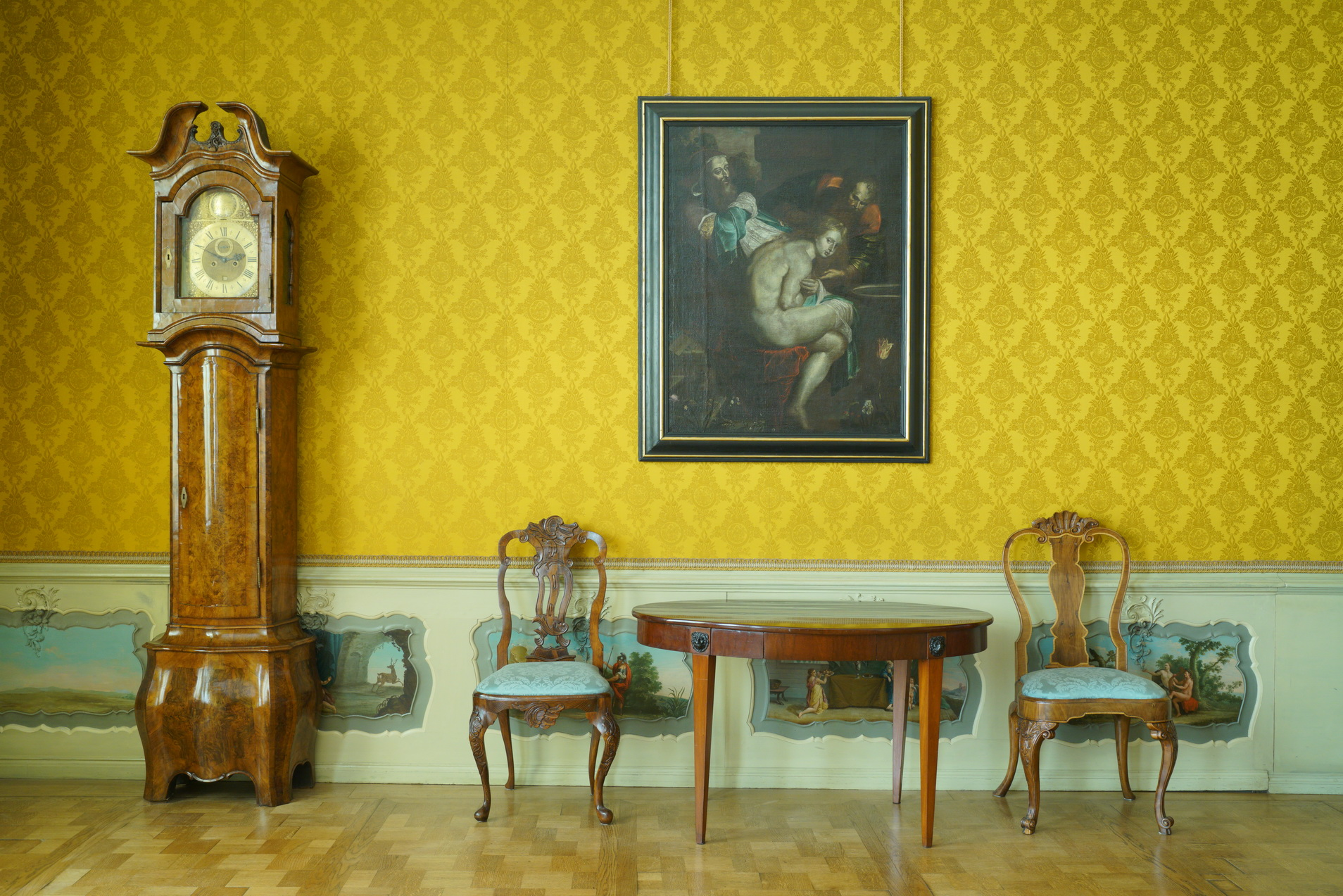

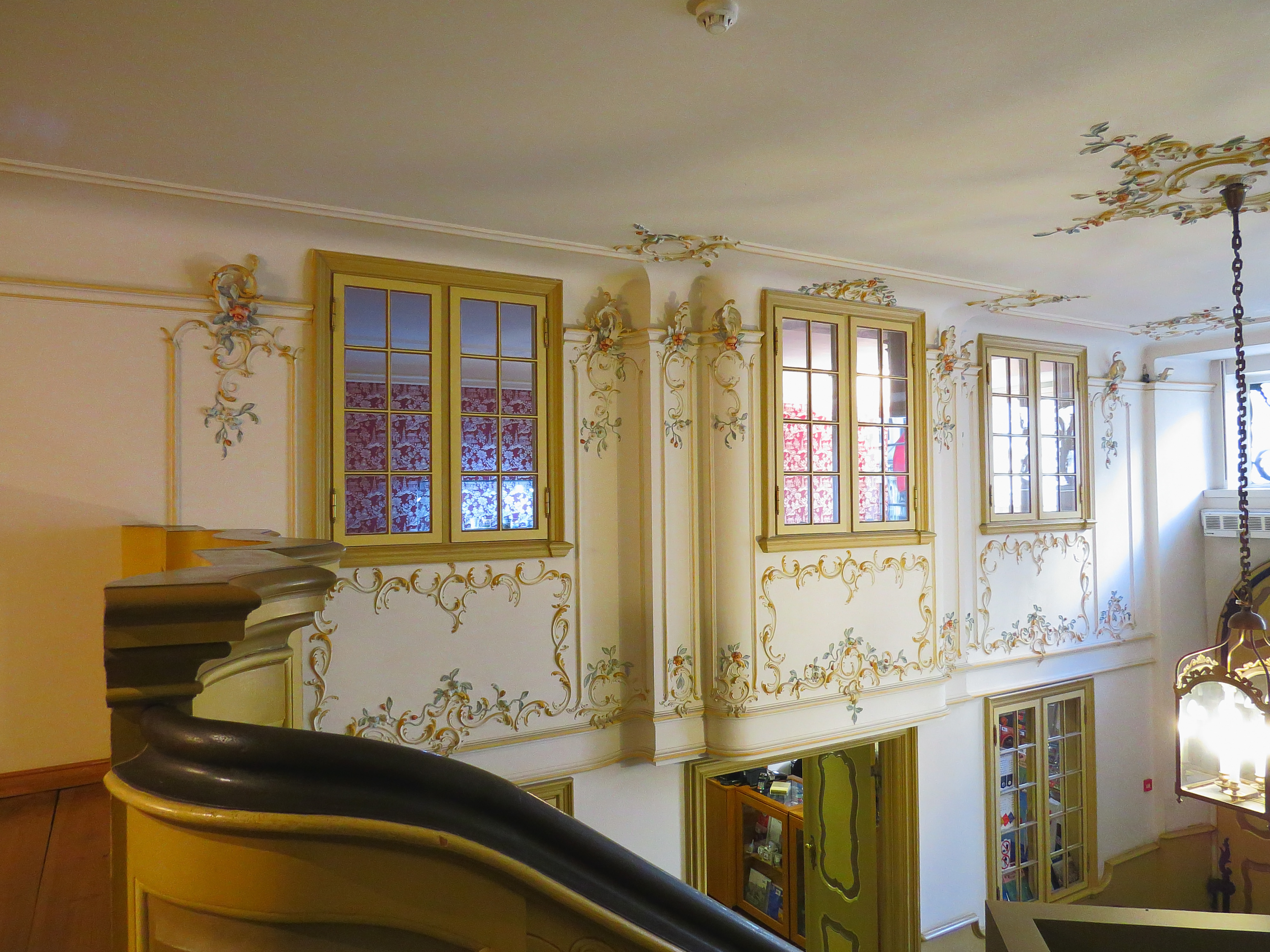
