= Museu do Estado de Pernambuco =

Museum in Recife, Brazil

Museum of the State of Pernambuco
- Museu do Estado de Pernambuco
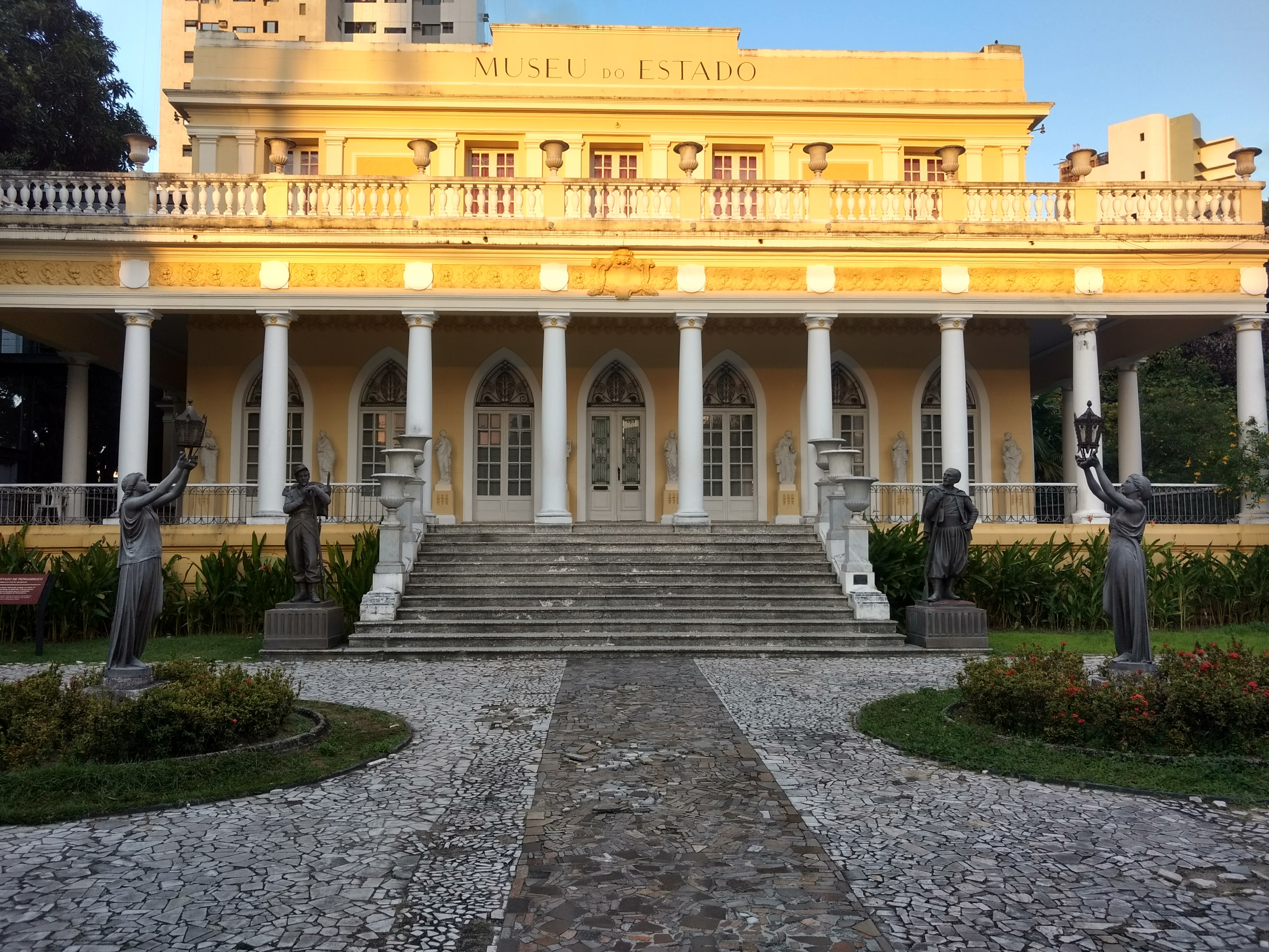
- Established: 24 August 1928
- Location: Recife, Pernambuco, Brazil
- Coordinates: 8°2′41.035″S 34°54′6.34″W
- Website: museudoestadope.com.br

The Museu do Estado de Pernambuco (MEPE) (Museum of the State of Pernambuco) is housed in a 19th-century mansion on the Av. Rui Barbosa in Recife, capital of Pernambuco state, Brazil. It was opened in 1929. The museum collections contain over 12 thousand works of art which invite the visitor to a journey into the local history, from pictures of Colonial Brazil and the period of the Dutch invasion (1630–1654), to those of the 20th and 21st centuries.

Periodically the museum hosts the “Salão de Arte Contemporânea de Pernambuco”, when emerging artists are selected to represent the new run of local professionals who will help maintain and shape the new profile of the local art scenery.
