= Lewitt =

Lewitt is a surname, and may refer to:

- Ben Lewitt (born 1978), English rugby player
- Jan Lewitt (1907–1991), Polish-British graphic artist
- Maria Lewitt (born 1924), Australian author
- Moritz Lewitt (1863–1936), German chess master
- Shariann Lewitt (born 1954), American author
- Sol LeWitt (1928–2007), American artist

== See also ==
- Lewitt (company), Austrian audio equipment company
