= Kämmerling =

Kämmerling is a German surname, related to Kammer, meaning "chamber". Spelling variants are Kammerling and Kemmerling.

Kämmerling

- Karl-Heinz Kämmerling (1930–2012), German pianist and academic teacher
- Maria Kämmerling (born 1946), German classical guitarist
- Stefan Kämmerling (born 1976), German politician

Kammerling

- Anna-Karin Kammerling (born 1980), Swedish swimmer

Kemmerling

- Andreas Kemmerling, founder of the European Society for Analytic Philosophy
- Jan Gerard Kemmerling (1776–1818), mayor
- Julie Kemmerling, Miss Iowa 1988
- Michael Kemmerling, actor
- Warren J. Kemmerling, actor

== See also ==
- Kammerer
