= Iwan Serrurier =

Dutch-American electrical engineer; invented the Moviola

Iwan Serrurier (September 21, 1878 – 1953) was a Dutch-American electrical engineer notable for inventing the Moviola.

== Career ==
Iwan was born in Leiden, Netherlands to Lindor Serrurier, director of the city's ethnographic museum, and Martina Lindo. In June 1903, Serrurier married Catharina Damme in Utrecht. Soon after, they moved to the United States and settled in Pasadena, California, where their son Mark was born in May 1904. Serrurier sold real estate and worked for the Southern Pacific Railroad as a draftsman.

In 1917 Serrurier designed a home movie projector, which he called the "Moviola", since he envisioned it being used in households similarly to the Victrola home phonograph. However, the Moviola's $600 price point (equivalent to $10,400 in 2023) meant few sold when it was first marketed in 1923. An editor at Douglas Fairbanks Studios suggested that Serrurier should adapt the device for use by film editors; he did this and the Moviola as an editing device was born in 1924. Serrurier expanded the Moviola Company over the following years, until his retirement in the 1940s.

Iwan Serrurier died in 1953. In 1979, Mark Serrurier accepted an Academy Award for Technical Achievement on his and his father's behalf for their contribution to movie editing.
