= Moviola =

Film editing device

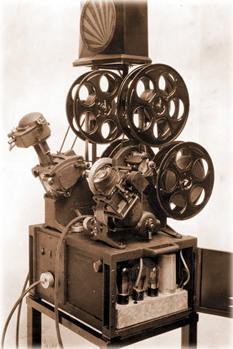

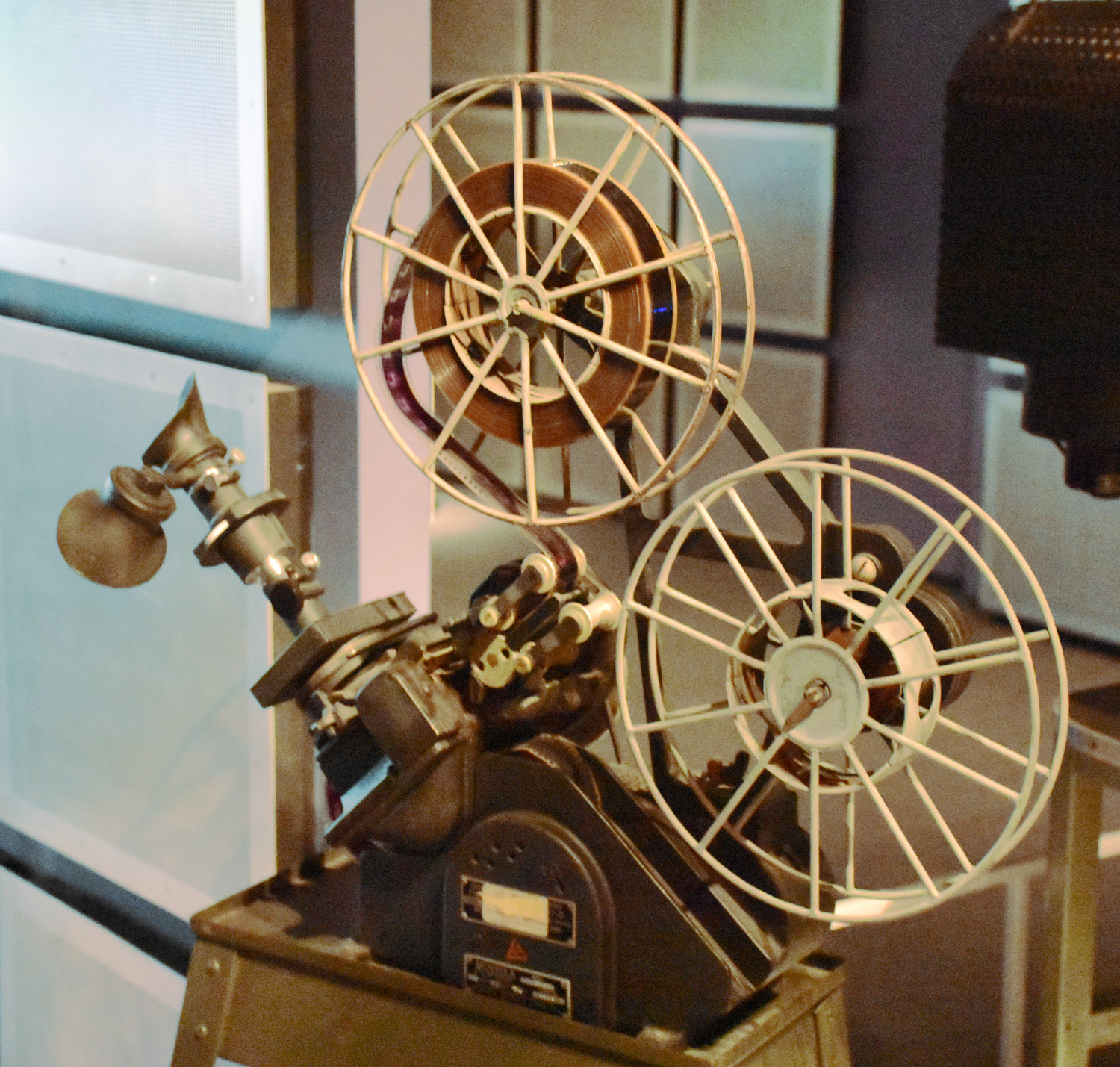
Moviola Model D (1927) with a microscope attachment (left) by Gaertner Scientific Corporation from 1940

A Moviola (/ˌmuːviˈoʊlə/) is a device that allows a film editor to view a film while editing. It was the first machine for motion picture editing when it was invented by Iwan Serrurier in 1924.

== History ==
Iwan Serrurier's original 1917 concept for the Moviola was as a home movie projector to be sold to the general public. The name was derived from the name "Victrola" since Serrurier thought his invention would do for home movie viewing what the Victrola did for home music listening. However, since the machine cost $600 in 1920 (equivalent to $9,400 in 2024), very few sold. An editor at Douglas Fairbanks Studios suggested that Iwan should adapt the device for use by film editors. Serrurier did this and the Moviola as an editing device was born in 1924, with the first Moviola being sold to Douglas Fairbanks himself.

Many studios quickly adopted the Moviola including Universal Studios, Warner Bros., Charles Chaplin Studios, Buster Keaton Productions, Mary Pickford, Mack Sennett, and Metro-Goldwyn-Mayer. The need for portable editing equipment during World War II greatly expanded the market for Moviola's products, as did the advent of sound, 65mm and 70mm film.

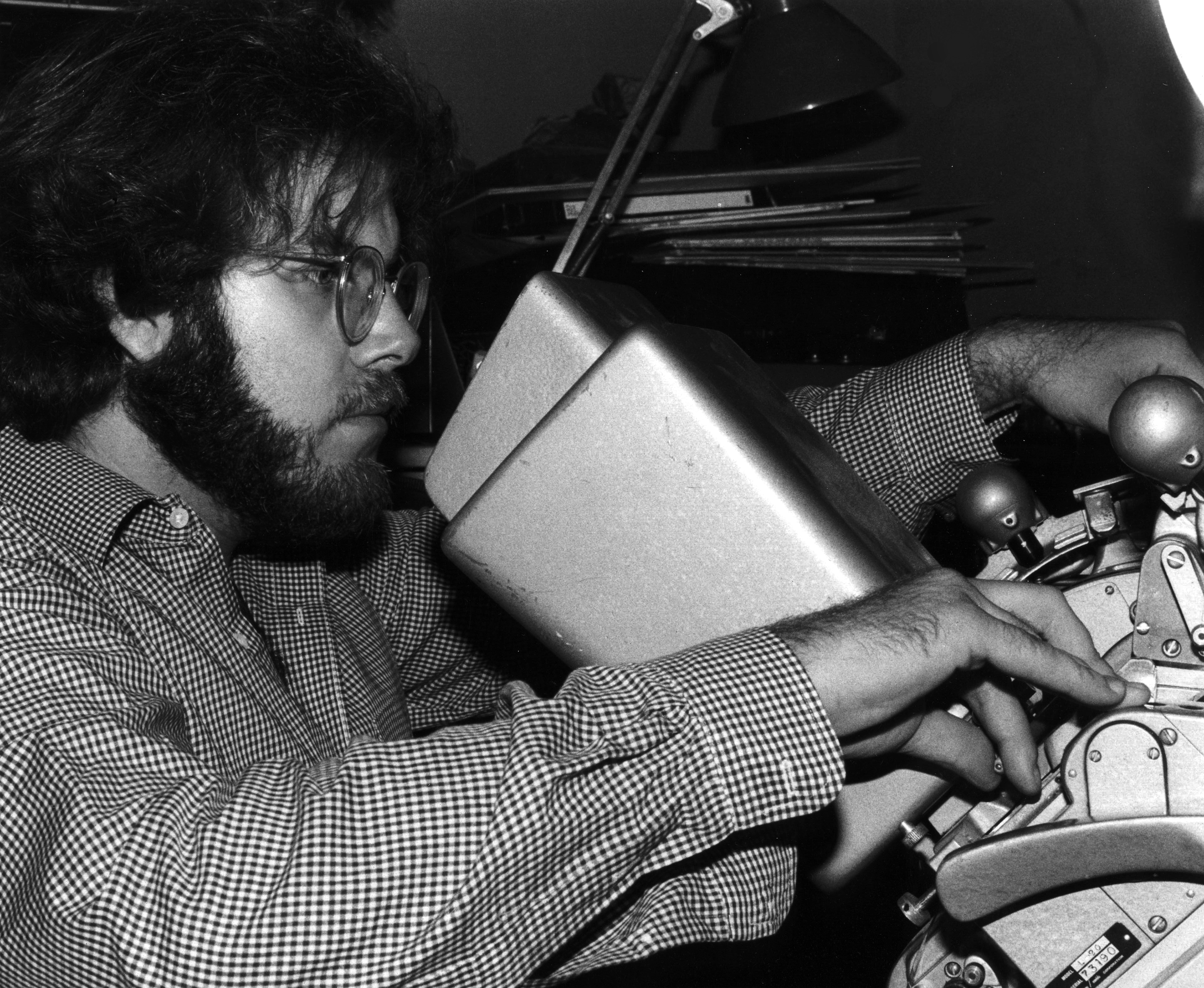
Filmmaker Brad Mays editing his first feature film Stage Fright on an upright Moviola, 1987.

Iwan Serrurier's son, Mark Serrurier, took over his father's company in 1946. In 1966, Mark sold Moviola Co. to Magnasync Corporation (a subsidiary of Craig Corporation) of North Hollywood for $3 million. Combining the names, the new name was Magnasync/Moviola Corp. President L. S. Wayman instantly ordered a tripling of production, and the new owners realized their investment in less than two years.

Wayman retired in 1981, and Moviola Co. was sold to J&R Film Co., Inc. in 1984.

The Moviola company is still in existence and is located in Hollywood, where part of the facility is located on one of the original Moviola factory floors.

== Usage ==
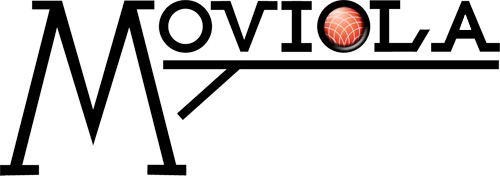
Moviola logo

The Moviola allowed editors to study individual shots in their cutting rooms, thus to determine more precisely where the best cut-point might be. The vertically oriented Moviolas were the standard for film editing in the United States until the 1970s, when horizontal flatbed editor systems became more common.

Nevertheless, Moviolas continued to be used, albeit to a diminishing extent, into the 21st century. Michael Kahn received an Academy Award nomination for Best Film Editing in 2005 for his work on Steven Spielberg's Munich, which he edited with a Moviola, although by this time almost all editors had switched over to digital film editors (Kahn himself switched to digital editing for his later work).

== Recognition ==
Mark Serrurier accepted an Academy Award of Merit (Oscar statue) for himself and his father for the Moviola in 1979.

To MARK SERRURIER for the progressive development of the Moviola from the 1924 invention of his father, Iwan Serrurier, to the present Series 20 sophisticated film editing equipment.

There is a star on the Hollywood Walk of Fame for Mark Serrurier because of the Moviola's contribution to Motion Pictures.

In 2024, a documentary film written by and starring film editor Walter Murch called Her Name Was Moviola premiered at Sheffield DocFest. The film features Murch in a reconstruction of a Moviola cutting room, and he demonstrates editing using footage from Mr. Turner.

== See also ==
- Flatbed editor
- Steenbeck
