= Florian Lobeck =

German naturalist

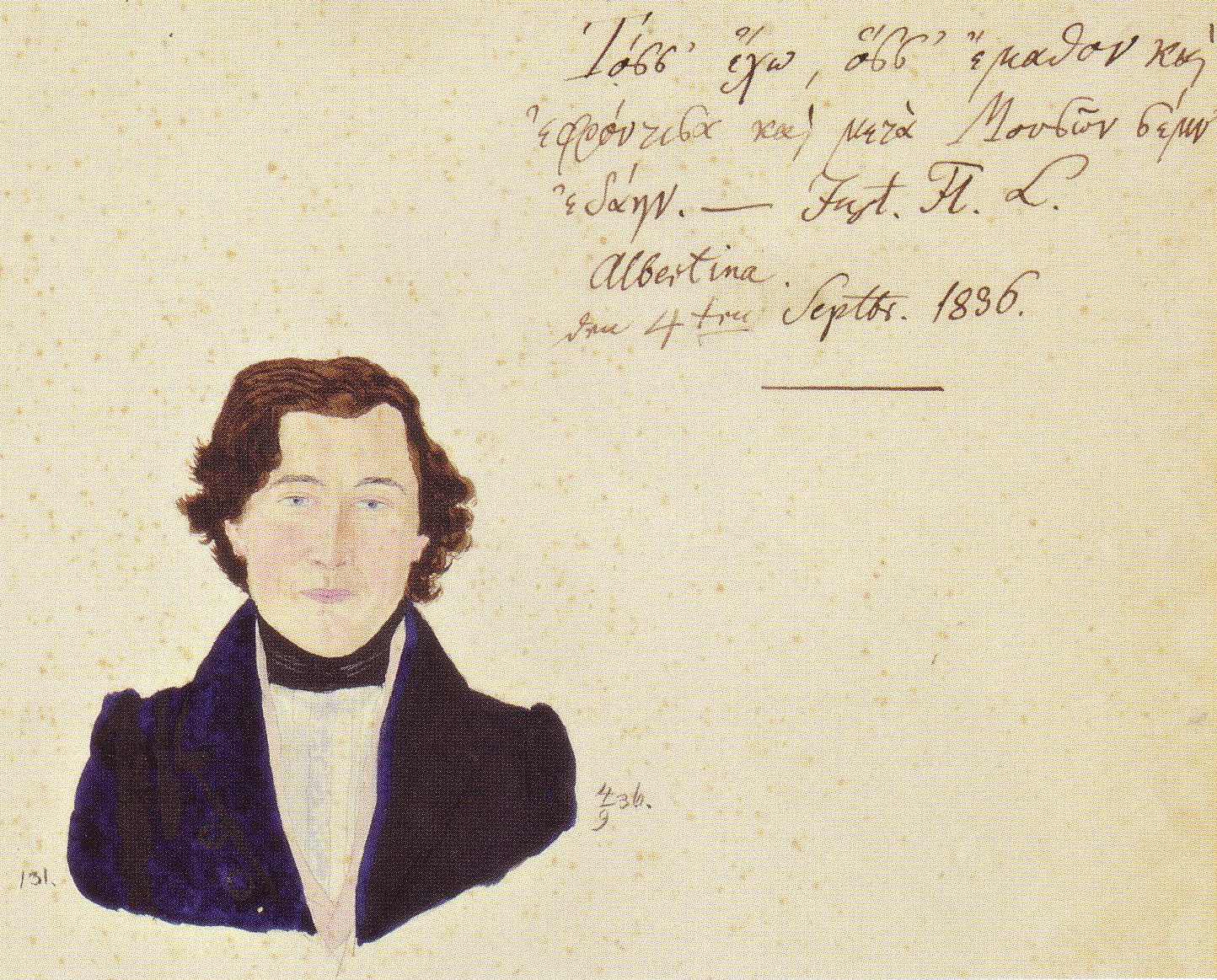

Florian Lobeck (born 16 January 1816 in Profen, Landkreis Zeitz, Province of Saxony; d. 18 August 1869 in Santiago de Chile) was a German naturalist.

== Biography ==
He was long a resident in Chile, where he had made large contributions to natural science, and was for several years professor of natural history in the University of Santiago.
