= Kochanski =

Kochanski or Kochański (Polish feminine: Kochańska) is a surname. It may refer to:

- Adam Adamandy Kochański (1631–1700), Polish mathematician
- Grazyna Kochanska, Polish-American developmental psychologist
- Halik Kochanski (born 1962), British historian of Poland
- Kristine Kochanski, fictional character from the Red Dwarf TV series
- Natalia Kochańska (born 1996), Polish sport shooter
- Mors Kochanski (1940–2019), Canadian bushman and wilderness survival expert
- Paul Kochanski (1887–1934), Polish violinist (born Paweł Kochański)
- Prakseda Marcelina Kochańska or Marcella Sembrich (1858–1935), Polish soprano
- Wladimir Jan Kochanski (1935–2015), American pianists
- Władysław Kochański (1918–1980), Polish army officer

== See also ==
- Kochanski multiplication
- Korochanski
