= Scheele =

Scheele is a surname. As a German surname, it may be derived from the Middle Low German nickname schele 'cross-eyed'. Notable people with the surname include:

- Carl Wilhelm Scheele (1742–1786), German-Swedish pharmaceutical chemist
- George Heinrich Adolf Scheele (1808–1864), German botanist
- Karin Scheele (b. 1968), Austrian politician; member of the European Parliament since 1999
- Leonard A. Scheele (1907–1993), American physician; Surgeon General of the United States, 1948-56
- Nick Scheele (1944–2014), British businessman; chief operating officer of Ford Motor Company
- Thomas von Scheele (b. 1969), Swedish table tennis player

== See also ==
- Scheele (crater), the lunar impact crater
