= Ebeling =

Ebeling is a family name of German origin. It may refer to one of the following persons.

- Carl Ebeling, American computer scientist
- Fredrik Ebeling (1909-1982), Civilian Forester
- Carl Lodewijk Ebeling (1924–2017), Dutch linguist
- Christoph Daniel Ebeling (1741–1817), German geography and history scholar
- Claudia Müller-Ebeling (born 1956), German anthropologist and art historian
- Elisabeth Ebeling (1946–2020), German film and stage actress
- Hans Ebeling (1905–1980), Australian cricketer and cricket administrator.
- Heinz Ebeling (1918–1987), German Luftwaffe Staffelkapitän and flying ace during World War II
- Jan Ebeling (born 1958), American equestrian
- Johann Georg Ebeling (1637–1676), German composer
- Karola Ebeling, German actress
- Kendall Ebeling (born 2006), American singer and member of girl group Girlset
- Klaus-Peter Ebeling (born 1944), German sprint canoeist
- Mathilda Ebeling (1826–1851), Swedish soprano
- Mick Ebeling (born 1970), American executive producer
- Richard Ebeling (born 1950), American libertarian author
- Werner Ebeling (1913–2008), German military officer
