= New Jury House =

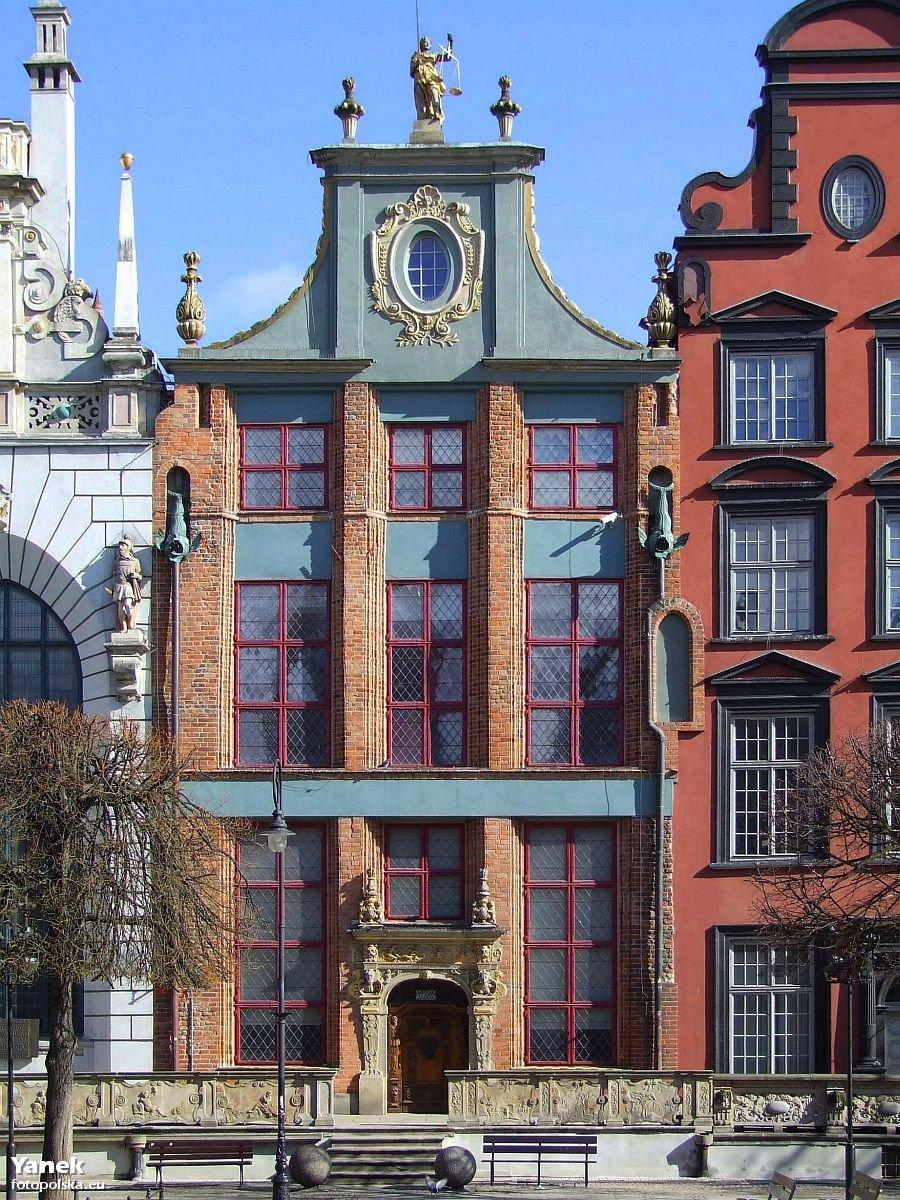
- The New Jury House in 2012
- Interactive map of the New Jury House area

General information
- Architectural style: Various
- Location: ul. Długi Targ 43; Śródmieście, Gdańsk
- Coordinates: 54.34849°N 18.65343°E
- Completed: 15th century
- Owner: Gdańsk Museum

Historic Monument of Poland
- Designated: 1994-09-08
- Part of: Gdańsk – city within the 17th-century fortifications
- Reference no.: M.P. 1994 nr 50 poz. 415

The New Jury House (Polish: Nowy Dom Ławy), also known as the Gdańsk Vestibule (Polish: Sień Gdańska; German: Danziger Diele), is a 15th-century townhouse in central Gdańsk, located beside the Long Market. Notable for the occasional appearance of the image of a woman known as the Lady in the Window within its topmost window, it is on the regional heritage list.

== Characteristics ==
The New Jury House is located beside the Long Market (Długi Targ), at ul. Długi Targ 43, close to the Artus Court. Its parts are constructed in various styles; its façade, created in 1712, is in Gothic style, its portal is in Renaissance style, and its gable and vestibule are in Baroque style.

=== Lady in the Window ===
The New Jury House's most prominent feature is the Lady in the Window (Polish: Panienka z okienka). Created by the artist Ewa Topolan, a latex sculpture of the Lady has been appearing at 13:00, 15:00, and 17:00 every day from 1 May to 1 October in the topmost window since 2001. The show is inspired by Panienka z okienka, a short story by Jadwiga Łuszczewska about such a lady appearing in Gdańsk. Since 2001, the Lady in the Window has twice been deactivated for renovation works, once in 2015 and the other time in 2019.

== History ==
The New Jury House was built at some point in the 15th century and was inhabited by families of the nobility up to 1709. The building's façade was created in 1712, the same year that it became the city court, a role that it gained its most common current name from. From 1794 to 1807, and then again from 1814 to 1879, the building housed the Trade and Maritime Court (German: Königliches Commerz- und Admiralitäts-Collegium) and the Trade Chamber of the City Court (German: Kammer für Handelschaften) from 1879 to 1900.

In 1901, the interior of the townhouse's vestibule was opened to the public as an exhibition of various private collections, primarily that of Lesser Giełdziński, the initiator of the exhibition project. It was given to him by the Danzig city government because of "its location and architecture, as well as its historical value". The interior still contained much of the original 17th-century furnishings and art. Exhibitions included furniture such as wardrobes, tables, and chests; the coats of arms of various Danzig guilds, as well as their goblets; ship models, as well as Danzig-related art pieces.

On account of Giełdziński being Jewish, with rising anti-Semitism in Danzig, all mentions of the man were removed from the museum in 1933, and in 1938, under the pretext of conservation works, his collections were removed. Nevertheless, the museum remained a local institution and was only destroyed in 1945. The townhouse was rebuilt around 1950 and handed over to the Gdańsk Sea Institute shortly after, though its interior was used by the Association of Polish Plastic Artists as well. In 1989, it was handed over to the Gdańsk City History Museum, today known as the Gdańsk Museum, and restored in 1996.
