= Steffens House =

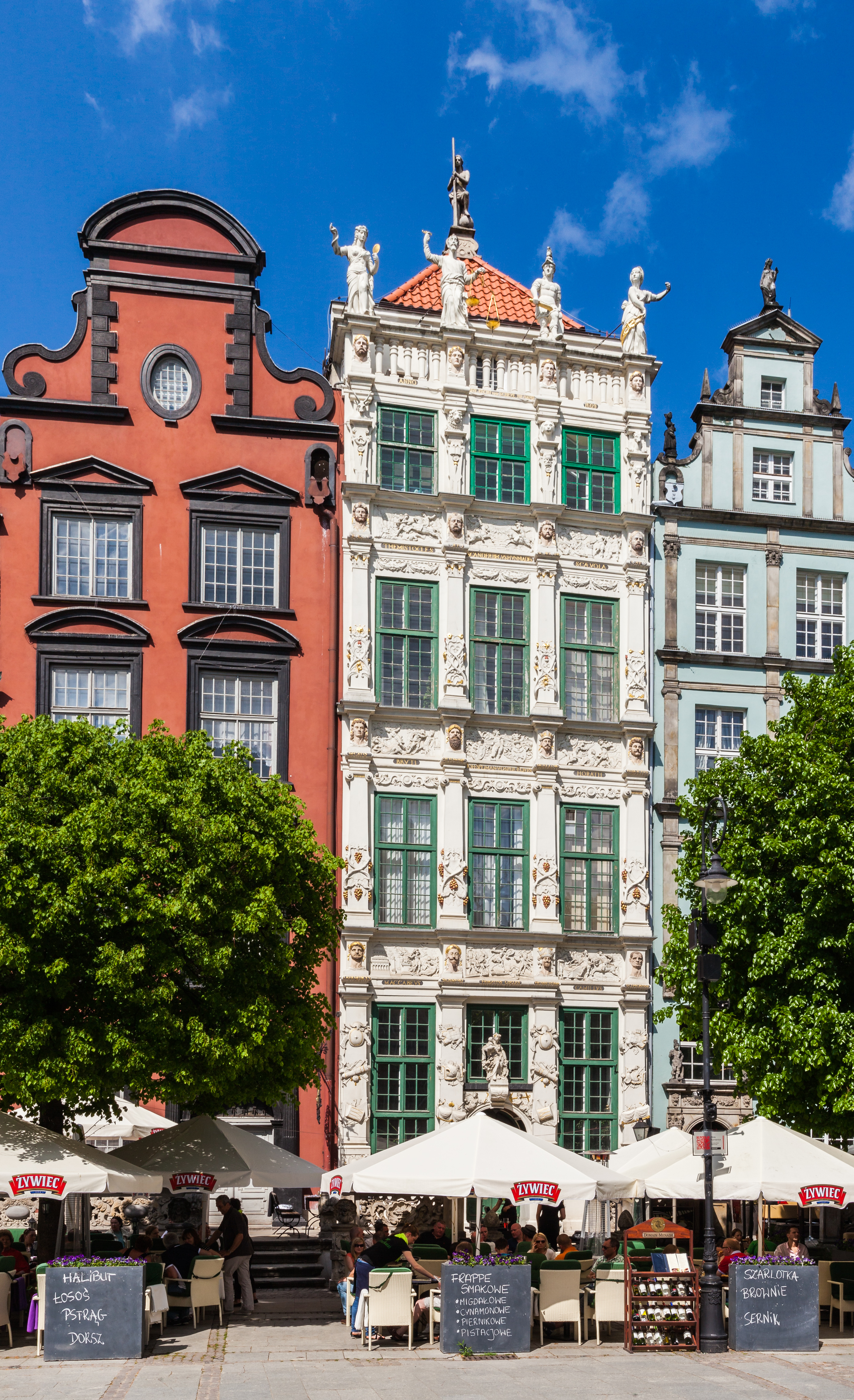
- The Steffens House in 2013
- Interactive map of the Steffens House area

General information
- Architectural style: Renaissance
- Location: ul. Długi Targ 41/42; Śródmieście, Gdańsk
- Coordinates: 54°20′55″N 18°39′14″E
- Year built: 1609–1618
- Completed: 1618
- Owner: Gdynia Maritime University

The Steffens House (Polish: Dom Steffensów), also known as the Golden House (Polish: Złota Kamienica) or Speimann's House (Polish: Dom Speimanna), is an historic 17th-century townhouse located beside the Long Market in central Gdańsk. It is on the regional heritage list.

== Characteristics and architecture ==
The Steffens House is located at ul. Długi Targ 41/42, beside the Long Market, near to locations such as the Main City Hall and Artus Court. Primarily built in a Renaissance style with some influences from Mannerism, its façade displays strong Neoclassical features, being decorated with several rows and columns of frescos; atop the façade are statues of Cleopatra, Oedipus, Achilles, and Antigone, whilst the rest of it is decorated with detailed bas-reliefs of mythological scenes. A central tourist attraction in the city centre, its appearance has made it an important sight.

== History ==
The earliest known record of a person owning a townhouse where the Steffens House is today comes from 1367. It was owned by several people from 1367 until it was bought by Johann Speimann in 1601, who, in 1609, requested Abraham van den Blocke to build a new townhouse on his land, completed in 1618. Even during Speimann's time, the tenement was a cabinet of curiosities being used to show various collections of his. In 1786, its owner became the merchant Carl Gottlieb Steffens, and it would remain in the hands of the Steffens family until 1918, when it was bought by the city government of Danzig.

In 1924, the townhouse was renovated and, from that year forward, owned by a bank, Sparkasse der Stadt Danzig. The following year, it was further restored by the architect Friedrich Fischer. In 1938, part of the collections of the State Natural and Prehistory Museum of the Free City of Danzig were moved to the townhouse's ground floor, disappearing after the end of World War II. During the Siege of Danzig, almost the entirety of the Steffens House was destroyed aside from the façade, being rebuilt from 1950 to 1955.

The Steffens House was then occupied by the Gdańsk Sea Institute. Ownership of the building itself has not changed, but the Sea Institute itself was acquired by the Gdynia Maritime University, which announced in December 2024 that it would be putting the Steffens House up for sale. The sale began in April 2025, but as of August 2025, no bid for the House has been successful.
