= Długi Targ =

Square in Gdańsk, Poland

Coordinates: 54°20′59″N 18°38′54″E

Long Market Square
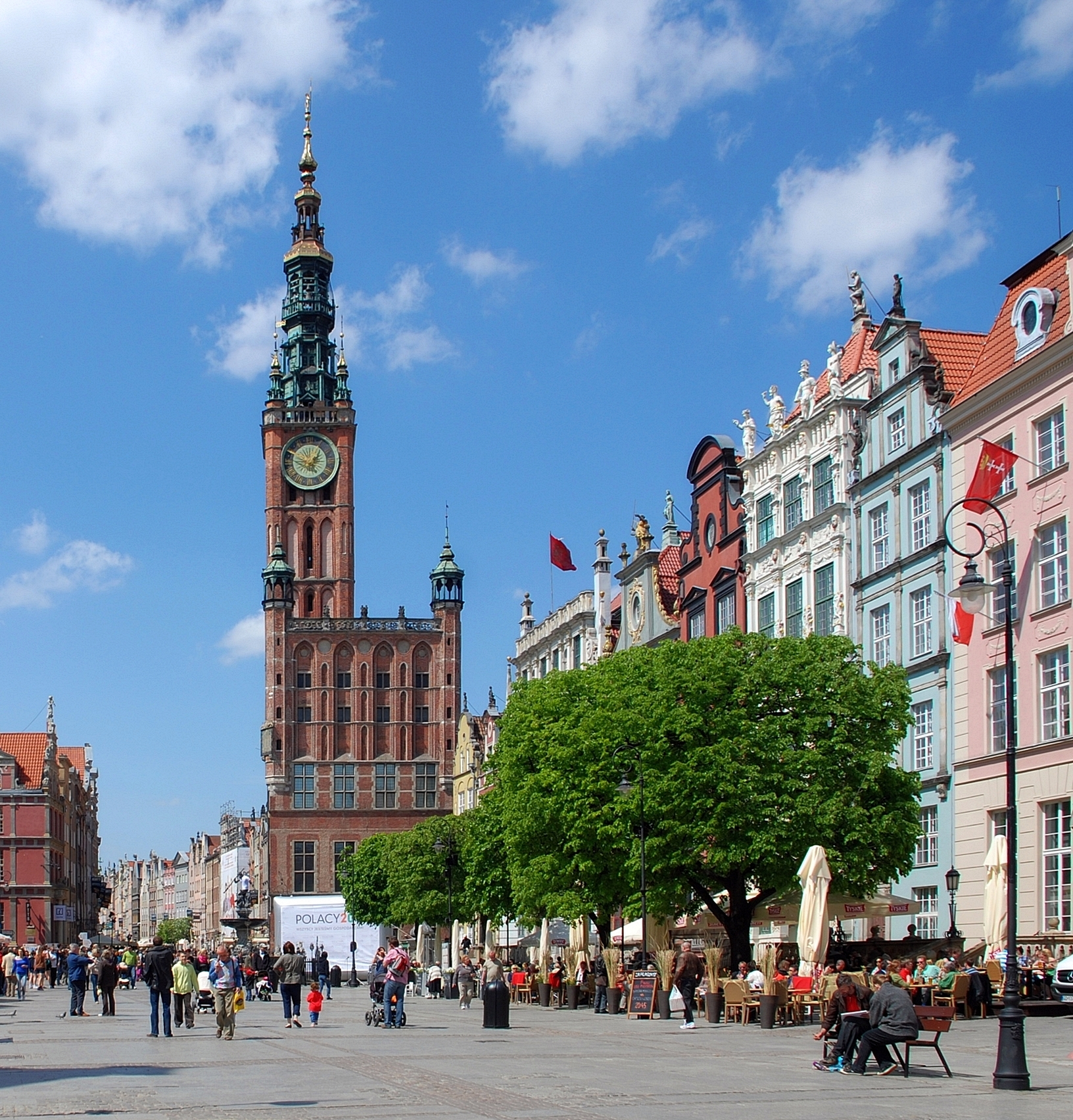
- Interactive map of Long Market Square
- Native name: Długi Targ (Polish)
- Namesake: Market
- Type: Medieval market square
- Location: Gdańsk, Poland
- From: Town Hall
- To: Green Gate

Construction
- Inauguration: 13th century

Historic Monument of Poland
- Designated: 1994-09-08
- Part of: Gdańsk – city within the 17th-century fortifications
- Reference no.: M.P. 1994 nr 50 poz. 415

The Long Market Square (Polish: Długi Targ; German: Langer Markt; Kashubian: Dłudżi Rénk) in Gdańsk, Poland, is one of the most notable tourist attractions of the city. It is situated between the end of Ulica Długa (the Long Lane), and the Green Gate (Brama Zielona), and forms part of the Royal Route.

== History ==
Established in about 13th century, initially as a merchant road leading to the oval market place. Soon after the Teutonic takeover of Gdańsk, known as the Gdańsk slaughter, the street become the city's main artery. Its official name in Latin Longa Platea was first written in 1331, the German name Langgasse was introduced later and the Polish Ulica Długa in 1552. Before the Partitions of Poland it was also called the Royal Route because it served as a road of solemn entrances into the city during the visitations by Polish monarchs. The latter name was popularized between 1457 and 1552. During the monarchs' visits to the city they were entertained in the tenement houses along the route and during the feasts of the royal family the city council arrange fireworks here.

The street was inhabited by the most prominent and the most wealthy citizens of the Royal City of Danzig. It was also a place of executions of witches, heretics and criminals that were nobles or city's citizens. The others were executed on Galgenberg/Szubieniczna Góra (Gallows Mountain) or in the Torture Chamber.

== Features ==
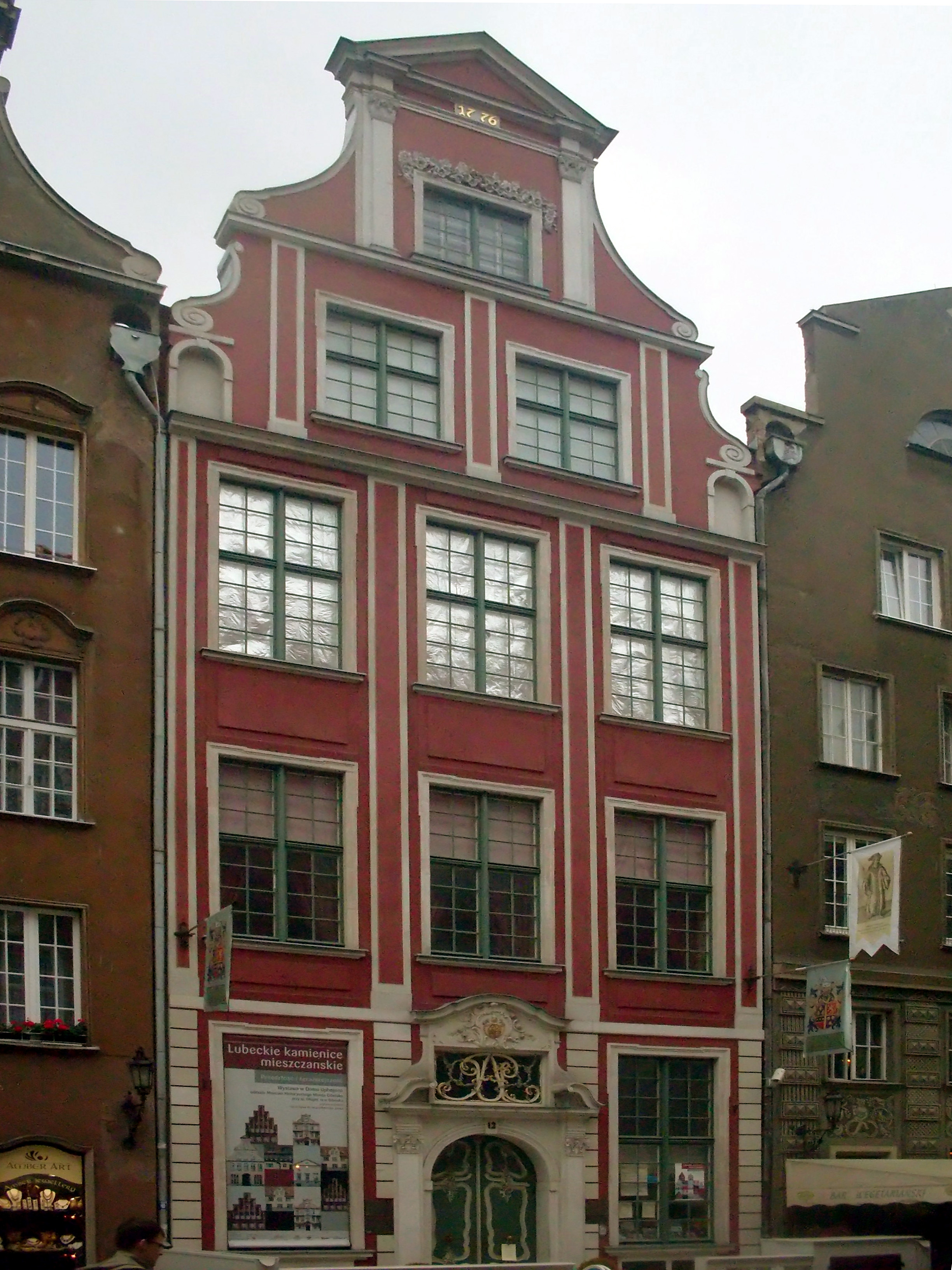
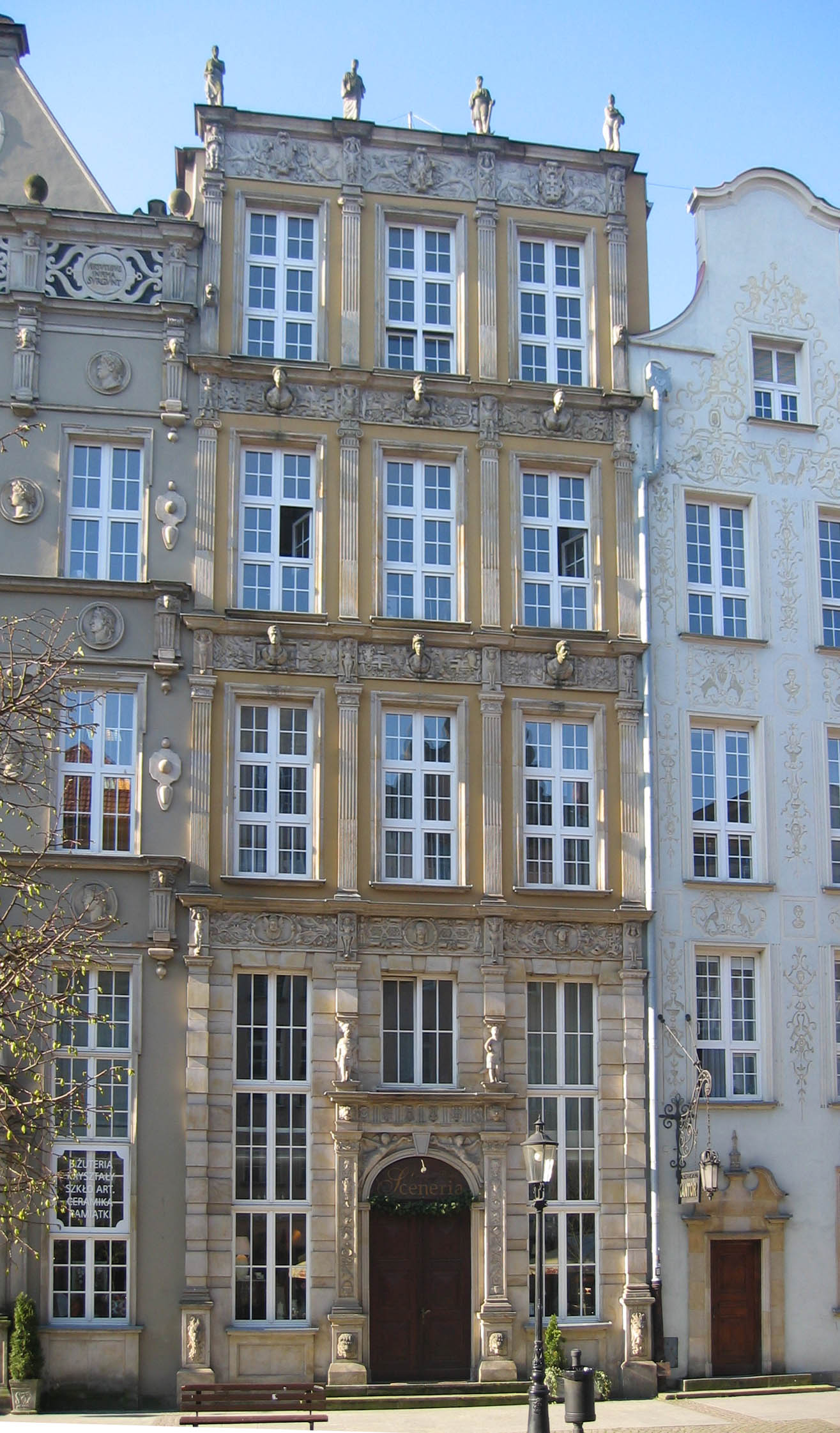
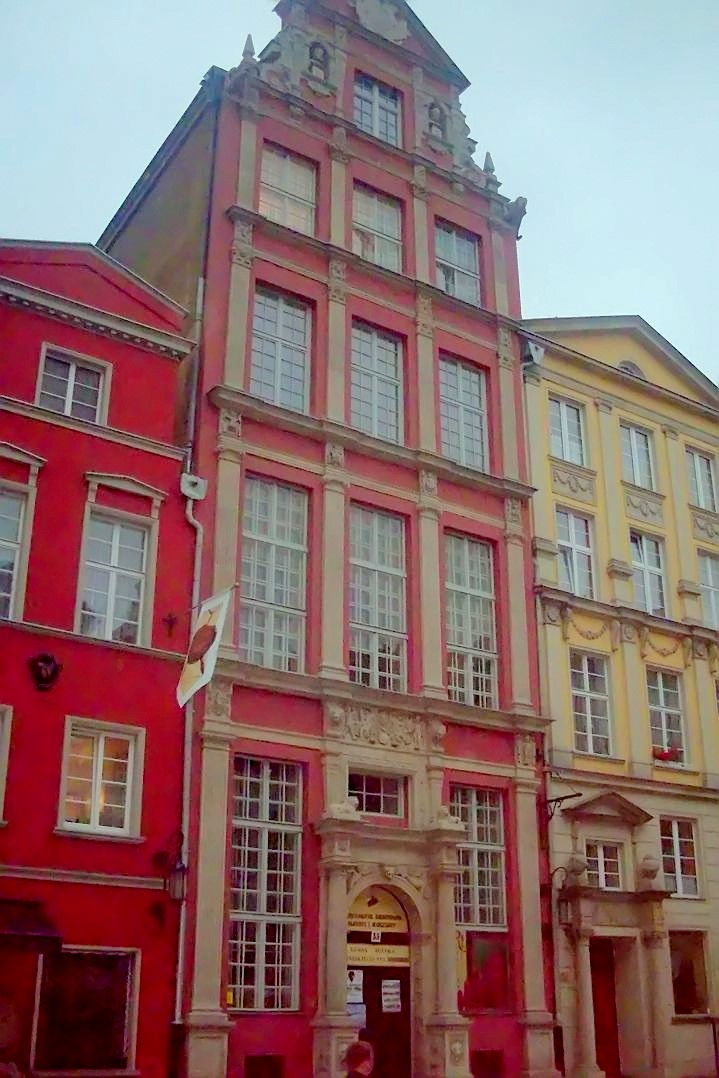
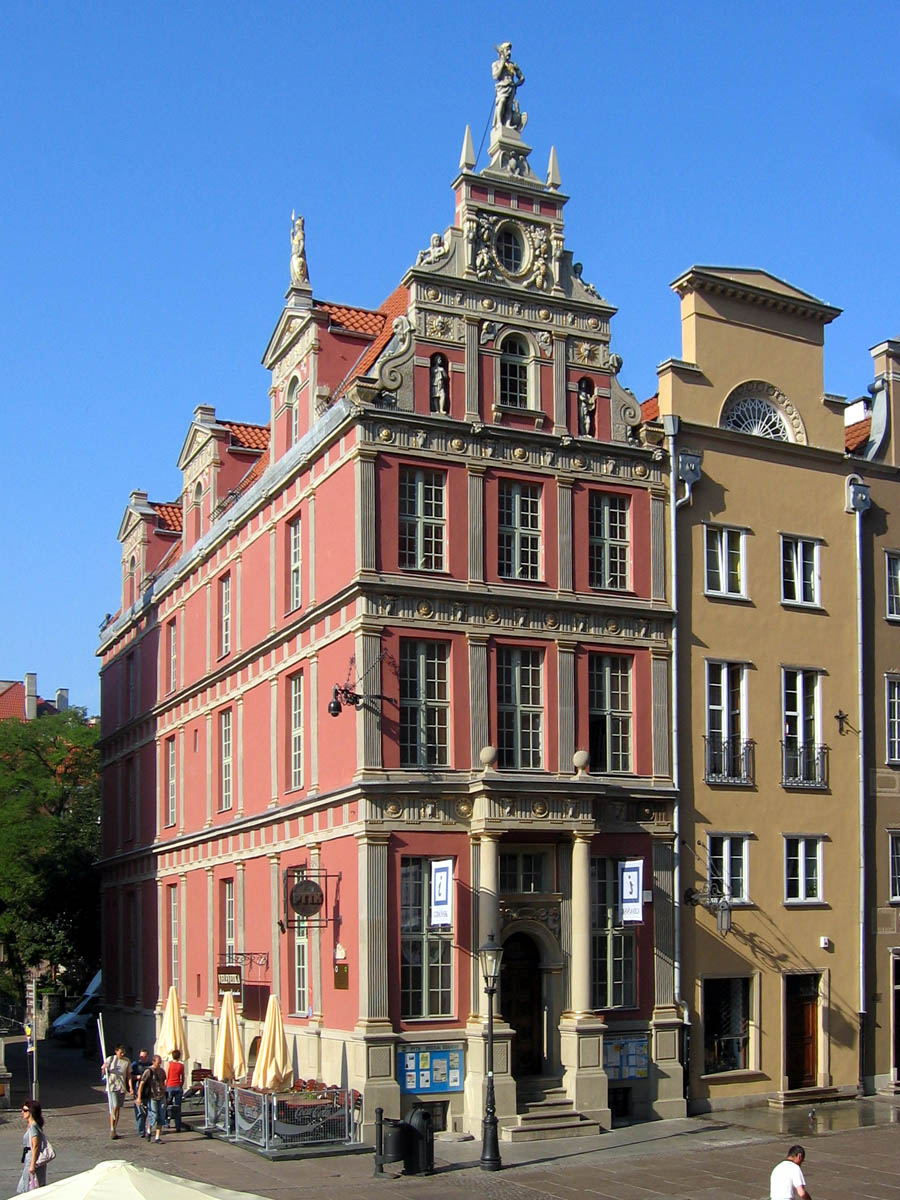
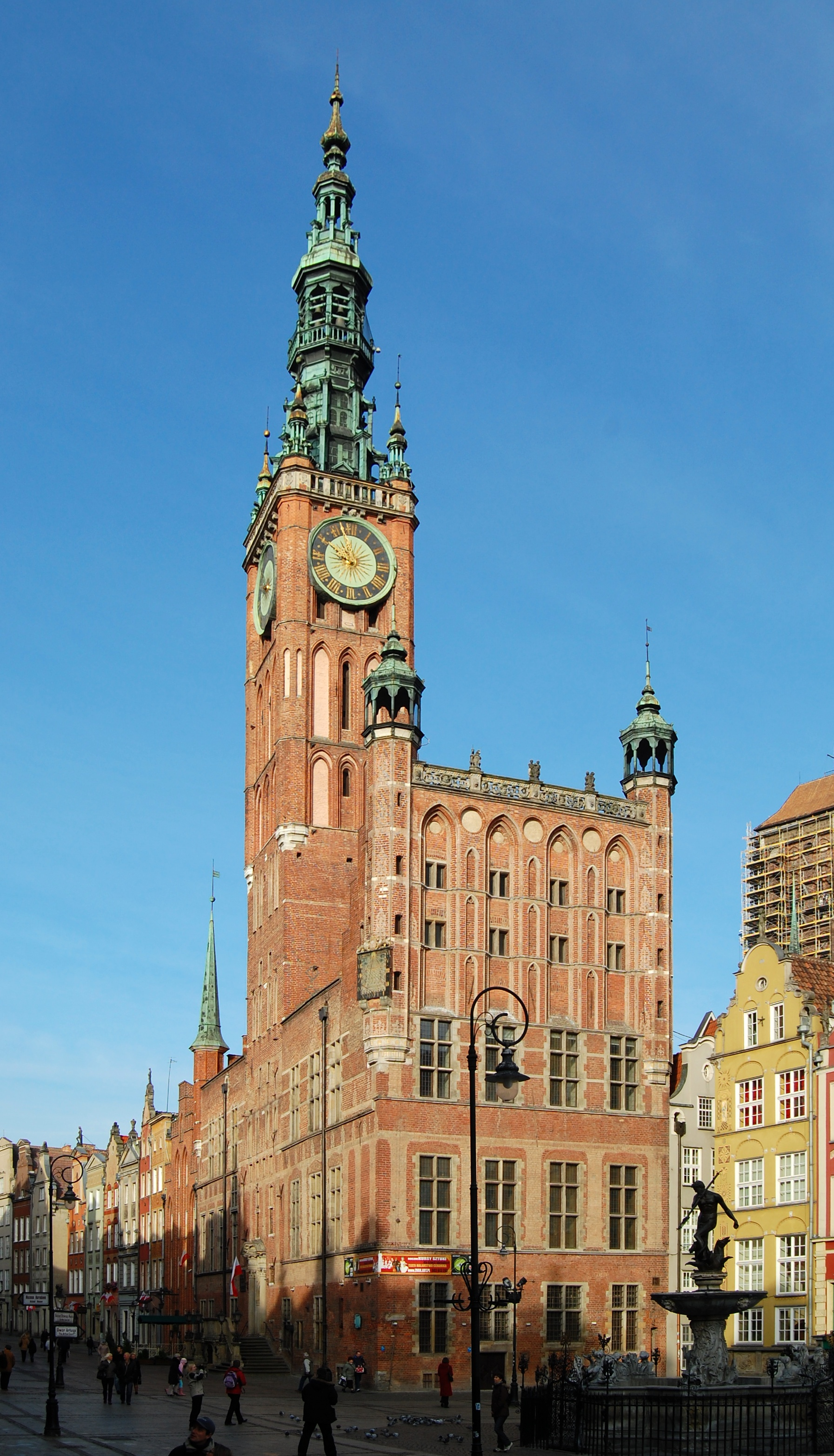
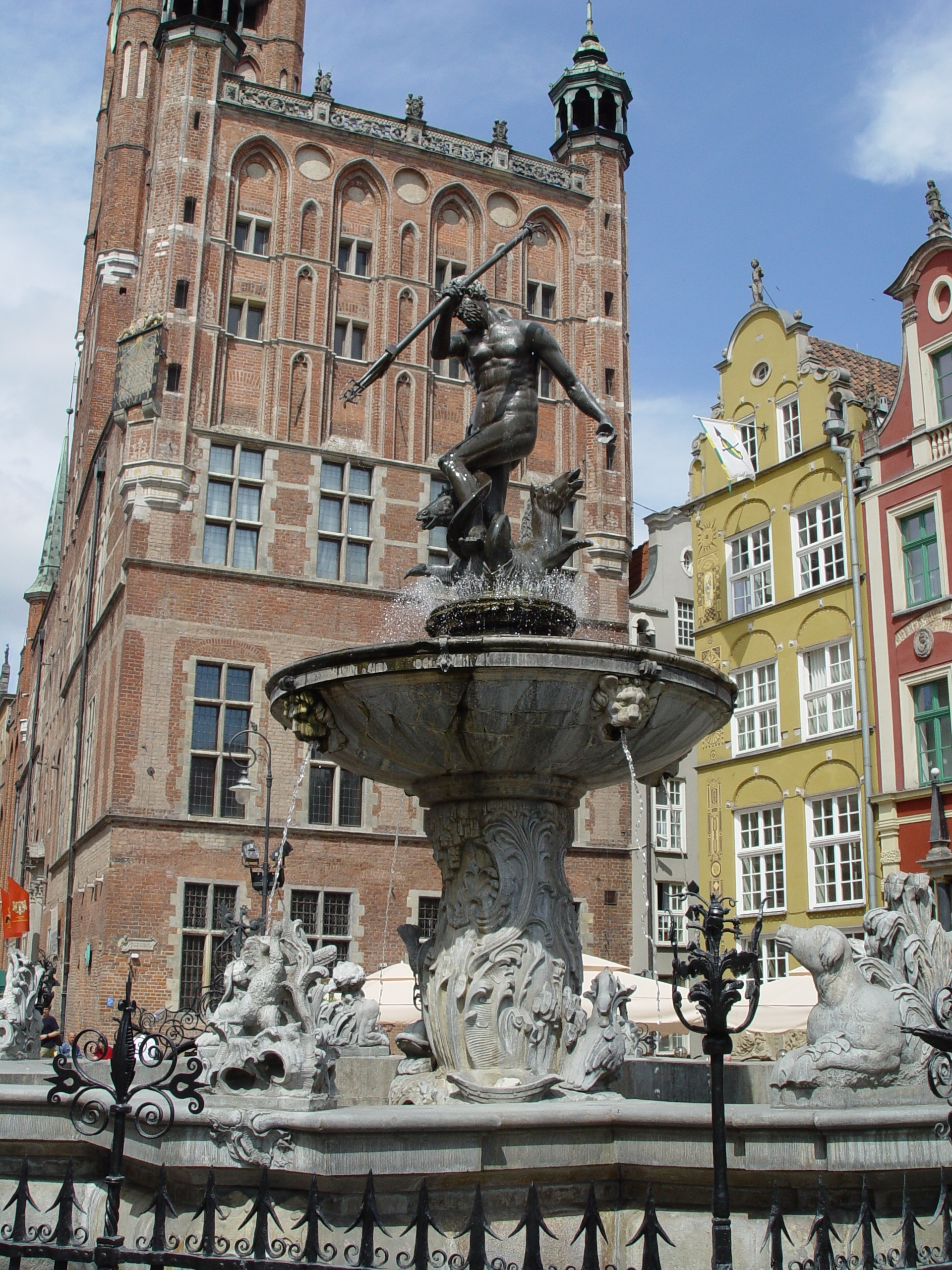
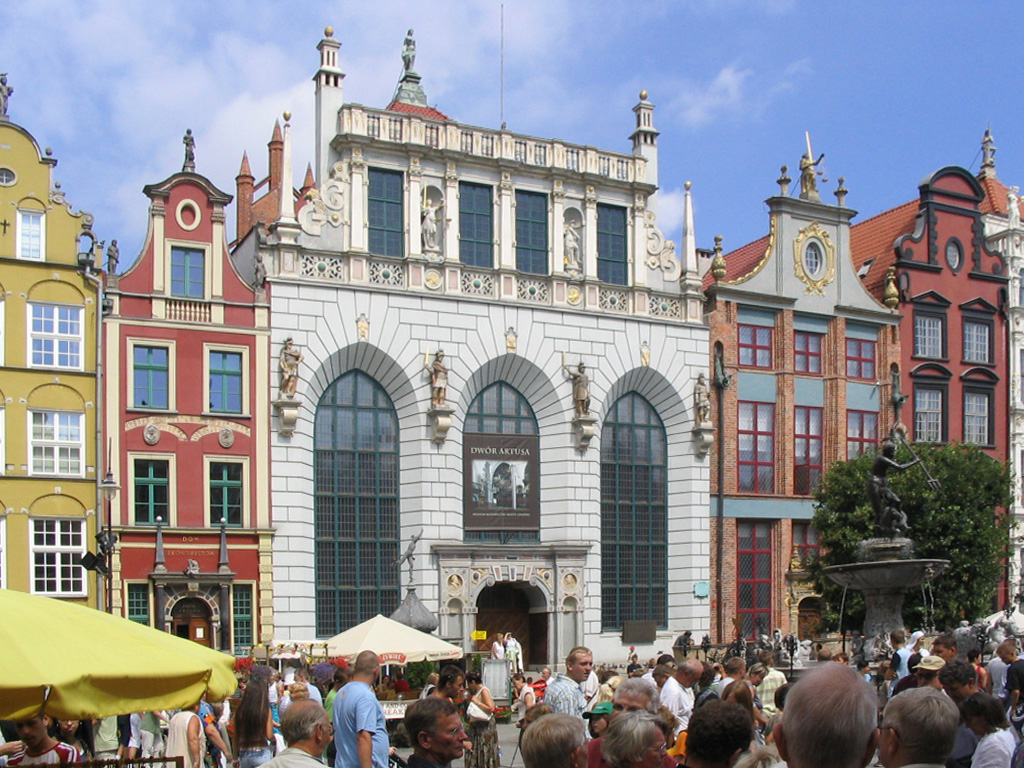
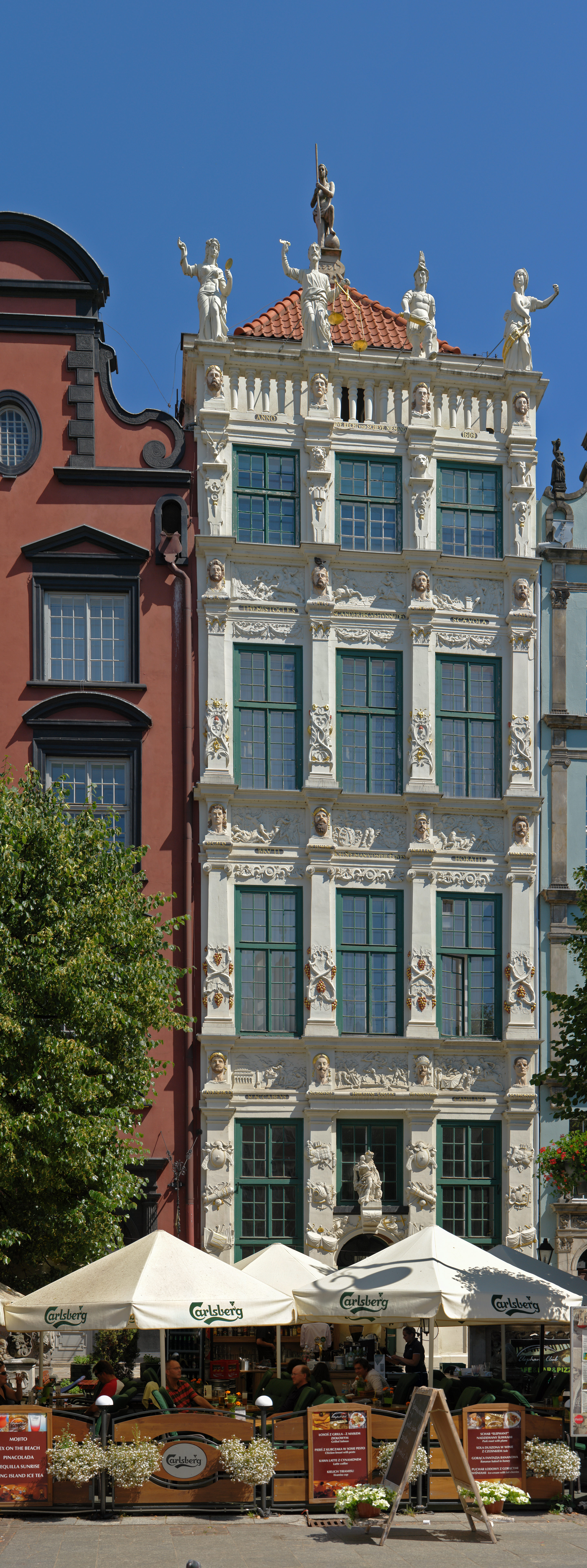
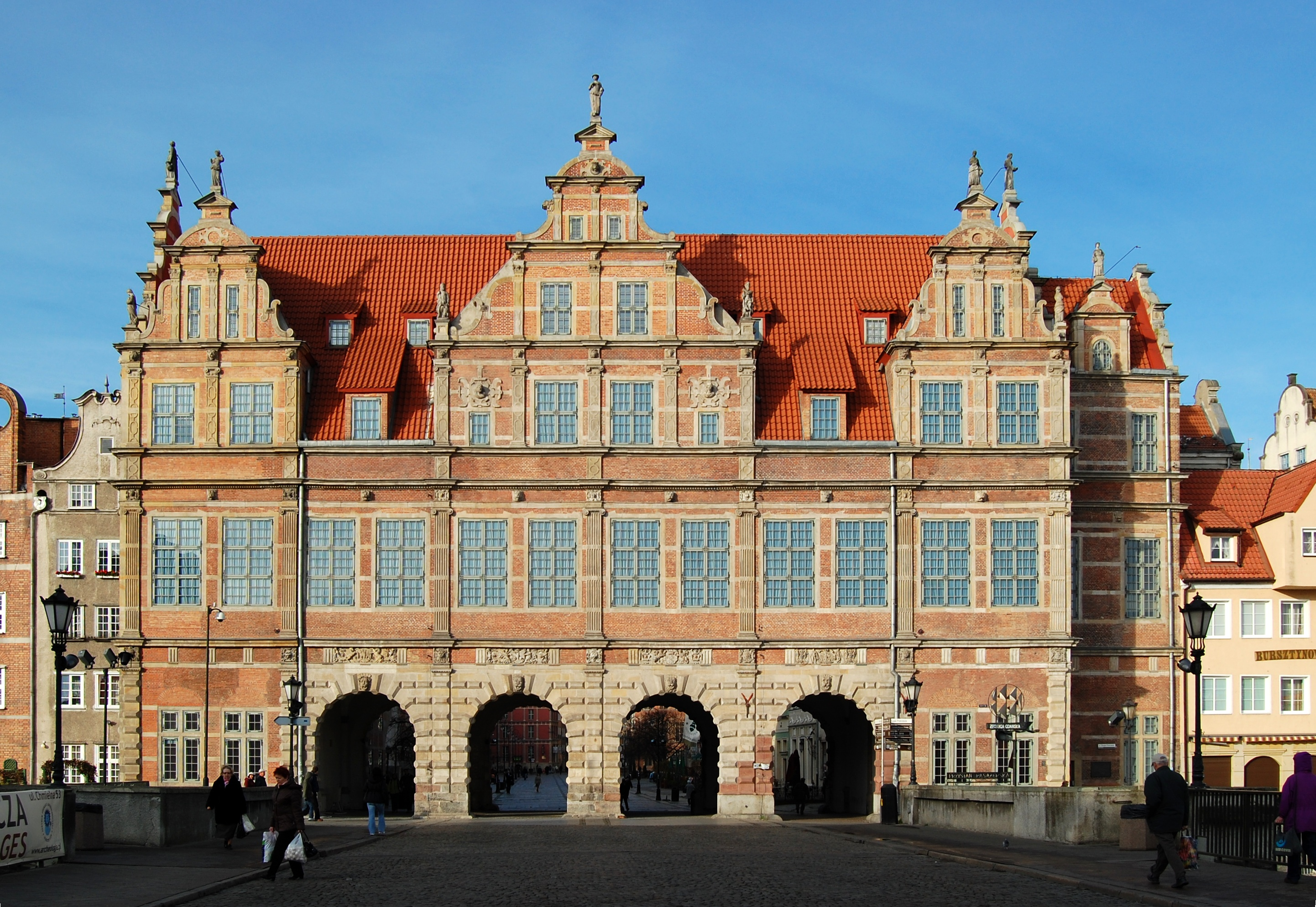
No.	Description	Picture
1	Hewel House. In the beginning of the 17th century it was owned by a merchant Georg Hewel (Jerzy Hewel). His wealth enabled him to found 11 ships to king Władysław IV in 1635, the core of the Polish fleet.
9	Curicke House. After 1632 it was owned by Georg Curicke (Jerzy Curicki), whose son Reinhold Curicke was an author of famous Description of the City of Danzig published in 1687 in Danzig and in Amsterdam.
12	Uphagen's House. The house was erected in 1776 for a merchant Johannes Uphagen. He died childless and left his property to the city under condition that his house will be kept unchanged. The interior is a good example of the 18th century merchant furnishings of the king Stanisław Augustus' epoch.
28	Ferber House. It was built for the city mayor Constantin Ferber in 1560. The attic is decorated with coat of arms of Poland, Gdańsk and Royal Prussia and four sculptures. Constantin Feber was prisoned in Łowicz by king Stephen Báthory because of his support for Archduke Maximilian during the 1575 election and rebellion against the king.
35	Lion Castle. Built for the Schwartzwald family in 1569. The facade was adorned by Vroom of Haarlem. The house was named after two lion sculptures decorating the main portal. In 1636 king Władysław IV Vasa was entertained in the house during his visit to the city. It housed the Russian Centre of Science and Culture until its closure in 2026.
45	Schumann House. Built for Hans Conert the Younger by unknown architect in 1560. The building was known at that time as the King's House. The top of the house is decorated with the sculpture of Zeus. Schumann House's architecture bears strong resemblance to Gildehuis der Kuipers (Coopers' House) and to Huis van de Schutters (Archer's House) in Antwerp.
46	Town Hall. The original 15th-century structure was reconstructed after a fire that broke out in 1556. In 1561 a gilded statue of King Sigismund II Augustus of Poland was installed on a pinnacle of rebuilt tower.
-	Neptune's Fountain. It was constructed in 1617 to design by Abraham van den Blocke. The fountain was founded by the city councillors at Barthell Schachtmann's initiative. The Neptune's statue was cast in Augsburg by Peter Husen and Johann Rogge. In 1634 the fountain was encompassed by a fence decorated with gilded Polish Eagles, also designed by Abraham van den Blocke.
44	Artus Court. It was originally built in about 1350 and reconstructed between 1616 and 1618 by Abraham van den Blocke.
41	Steffens House. It was built between 1609 and 1618 by Abraham van den Blocke. Constructed for Johann Speymann, a wealthy grain trader and mayor of the city, and his wife Judith Bahr. The attic is decorated with sculptures depicting Cleopatra, Oedipus, Achilles and Antigone by Johann Vogt of Rostock.
24	Green Gate. It was inspired by the Antwerp City Hall (architect Regnier van Amsterdam). It was built to serve as the formal residence of the Polish monarchs.

== See also ==
- List of mannerist structures in Northern Poland
