= Głogów Town Hall =

Coordinates: 51°42′N 16°06′E

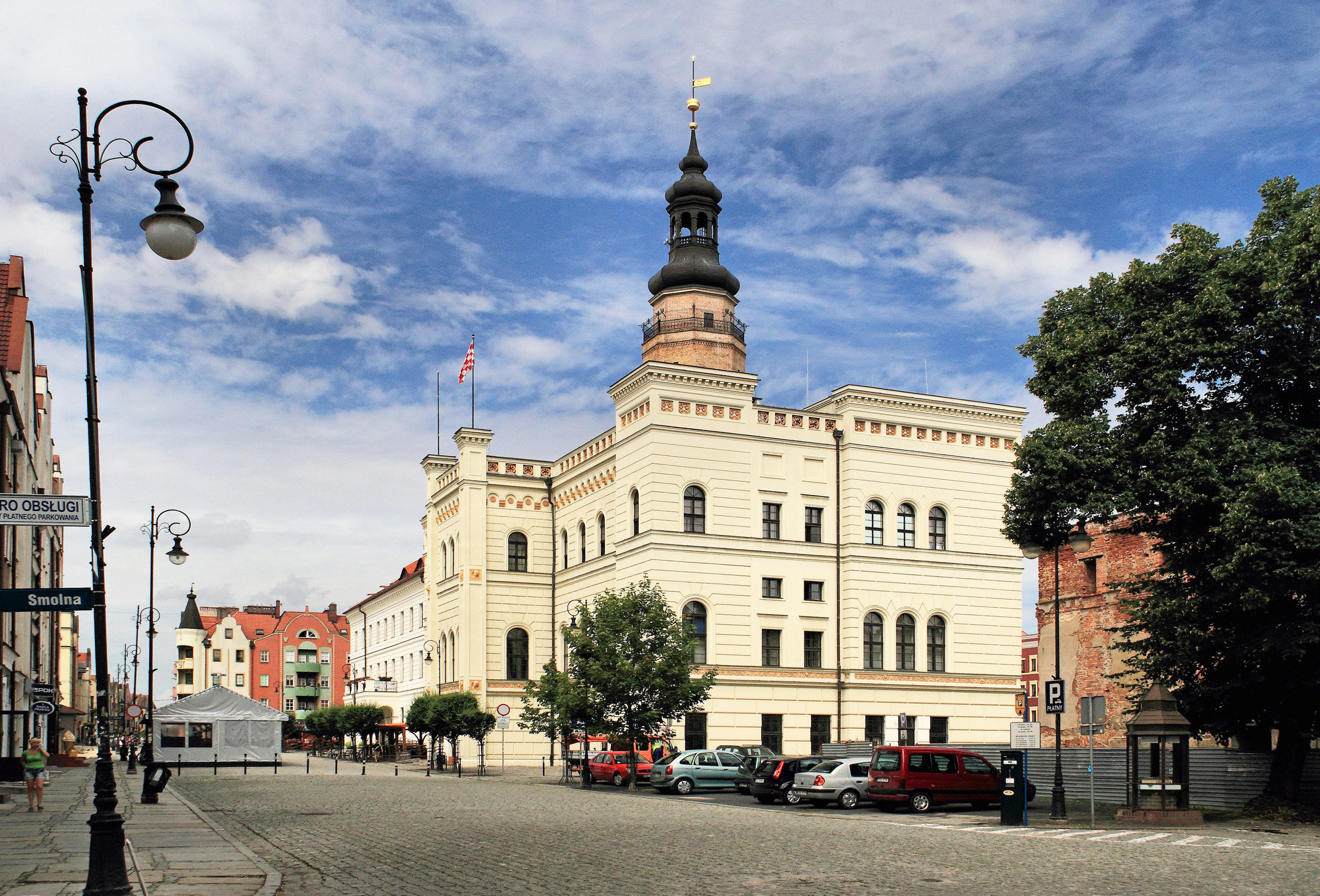
Głogów Town Hall

The origins of the Głogów Town Hall date back to the end of the 13th century, to the times of the town's incorporation by Conrad I of Głogów, when a watchtower was built. Over time the building was extended and in 1349 a two-winged, brick town hall was built. The building was damaged by fires in 1420 and 1433, however, the biggest fire took place in 1574, after which the town hall was rebuilt in a Renaissance style, while the tower was topped with a cupola. The appearance of the building from that period was immortalized in the 18th century in a drawing by Friedrich Bernhard Werner, which was published in Topographia Seu Compendium Silesiae.

The town hall lost its Renaissance form during a thorough reconstruction in 1823–1835, designed by architect A. Soller. Two contrasting wings were created at that time: the western wing with Prussian Classicist features and the eastern wing, built in the Florentine style, fashionable at that time.

In the 19th century the clock on the town hall tower had its hands reversed - the large one indicated hours, the small one minutes. It was the reason for frequent arguments and misunderstandings between visitors and locals. The townspeople of Głogów felt a kind of pride, treating the clock as a distinctive feature of their town. Later the town hall was equipped with a clock made by the Glogau Weiss clock factory, which won a gold medal at the 1873 world exhibition in Vienna.

A banner with a Nazi swastika was hoisted for the first time on the Głogów town hall on March 5, 1933. During the fights for Głogów in 1945 the town hall was severely damaged. Only the lower parts of the tower remained.

The decision to rebuild the town hall as it was after its reconstruction in 1835 was taken by the Municipal Office in January 1984 and construction works started in May 1984. The investment cost amounted to PLN 14 million over 18 years. The western wing of the building was completed in 2000. Since 2002, the town hall has been serving the town's residents again as it houses the Municipal Office.

The tower, 80.35 m high (the highest town hall tower in Silesia and the second highest in Poland, after the Main Town Hall in Gdańsk; it is 13 cm lower than the original from 1720), was reconstructed in 1994–1996, based on the original from 1720. It has a square base, transitioning to an octagon higher up. A tender was issued in 2016 for the plastering of the tower. The clock was also restored, with a 3.55 m diameter of the dials. An observation deck is located at a height of 47.07 m.

Valuable interiors, dating mainly from the turn of the Gothic and Renaissance, have been preserved in the eastern wing on the first floor. One of the rooms has a net vault - supported on a central column. The adjoining room is decorated with a crystal vault.

Radio Elka Głogów (89.6 MHz; ERP 0.2 kW) broadcasts from the town hall tower.
