= Green Gate =

Coordinates: 54.347915°N 18.655784°E

- Brama Zielona
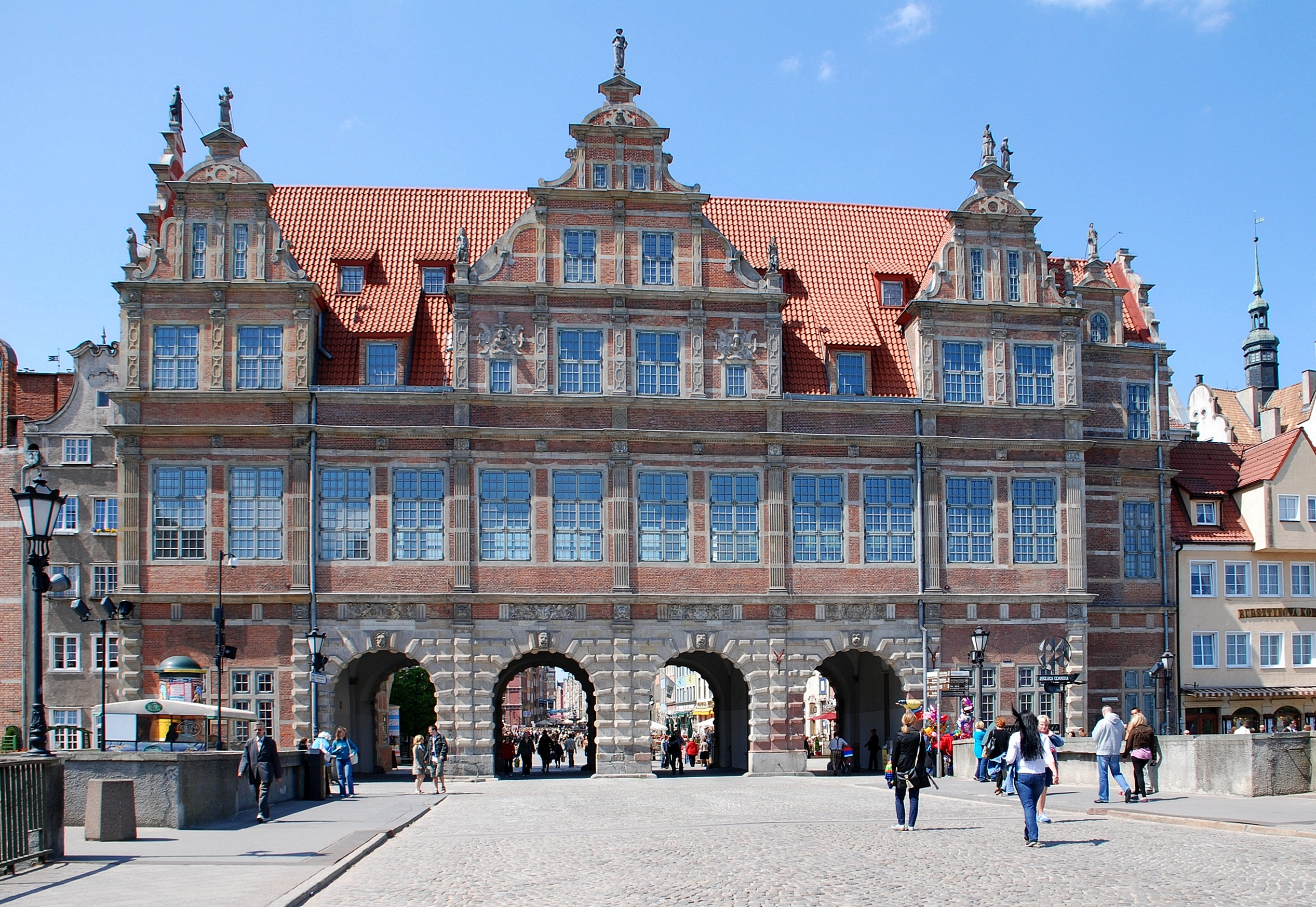
- Interactive map of the Green Gate area

General information
- Architectural style: Dutch-Flemish mannerism
- Location: Gdańsk, Poland
- Construction started: 1564
- Completed: 1568

Design and construction
- Architect: Reiner van Amsterdam

Historic Monument of Poland
- Designated: 1994-09-08
- Part of: Gdańsk – city within the 17th-century fortifications
- Reference no.: M.P. 1994 nr 50 poz. 415

The Green Gate (Polish: Brama Zielona, former German: Koggentor, now Grünes Tor) in Gdańsk, Poland, is one of the city's most notable tourist attractions. It is situated between Long Market (Długi Targ) and the River Motława.

== History ==
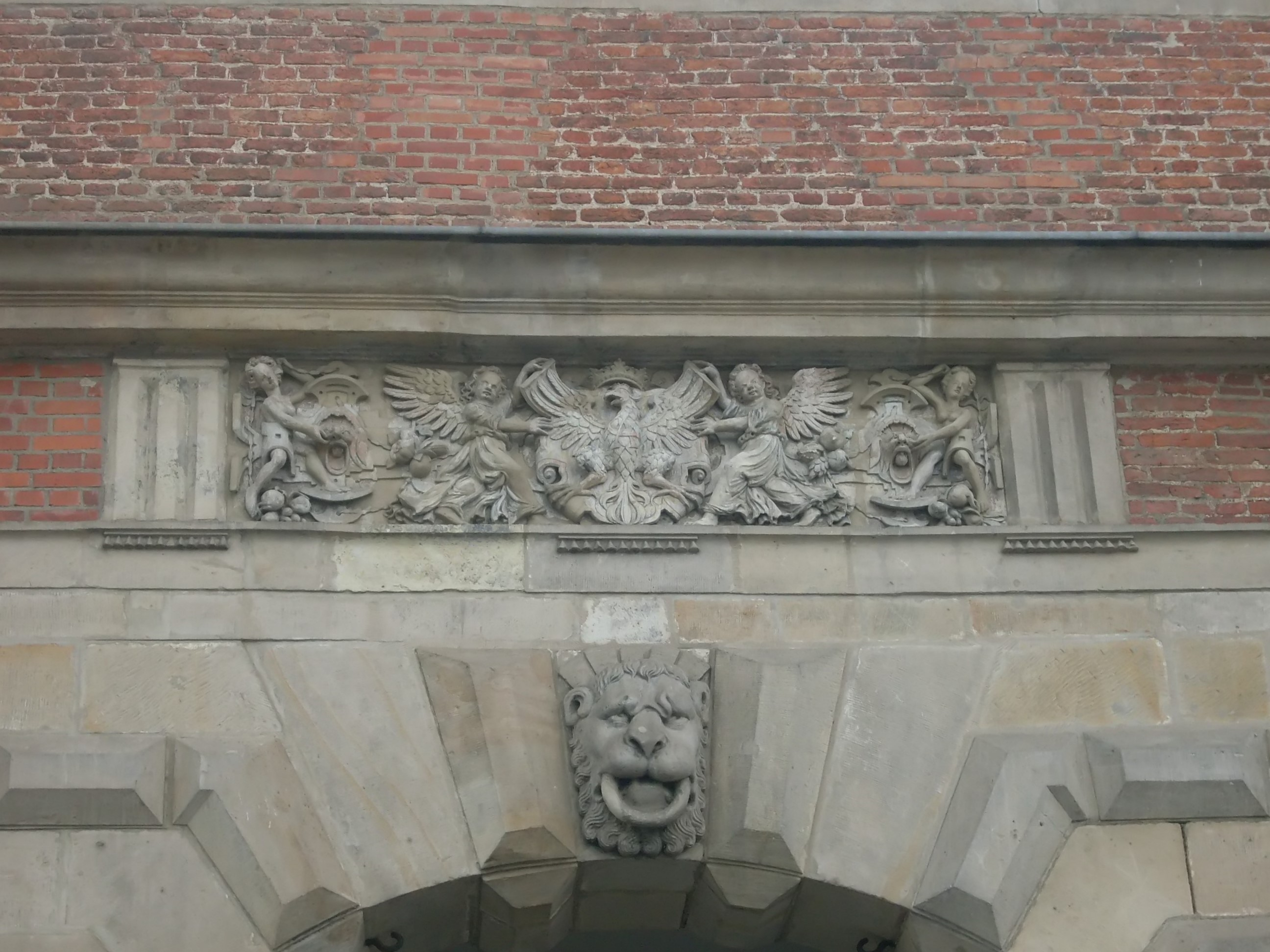
16th century coat of arms of Poland

With the Golden Gate and the Highland Gate, the Green Gate spans the Long Market and Long Street, together comprising the Royal Route. The Green Gate was clearly inspired by the Antwerp City Hall. It was built 1568-71 as the formal residence of Poland's monarchs. It is a masterpiece by Regnier (or Reiner van Amsterdam), an Amsterdam architect, and reflects Flemish architectural influence in Gdańsk. Hans Kramer from Dresden was responsible for the construction plans.

Despite its original purpose of construction, the Polish king never stayed there. On 11–20 February 1646 the future Queen of Poland, Marie Louise Gonzaga, was entertained here. In the late 18th century the Nature Society was housed here, but soon moved to the Naturalists' House (Research Society House).

Today the Green Gate houses the National Museum in Gdańsk. Exhibitions, meetings, conferences and shows are held here. The Gdańsk office of former Polish President Lech Wałęsa is located in one of the rooms.

== See also ==
- List of mannerist structures in Northern Poland
