= List of mannerist structures in Northern Poland =

The mannerist architecture and sculpture in Poland have two major traditions – Polish/Italian and Dutch/Flemish, that dominated in northern Poland. The Silesian mannerism of South-Western Poland was largely influenced by Bohemian and German mannerism, while the Pomeranian mannerism of North-Western Poland was influenced by Gothic tradition and Northern German mannerism. The Jews in Poland adapted patterns of Italian and Polish mannerism to their own tradition. The mannerist complex of Kalwaria Zebrzydowska and mannerist City of Zamość are UNESCO World Heritage Sites.

Triangle gables of late Gothic origin and large windows are the features of Dutch urban architecture in Northern Poland. Among notable architects and sculptors of Dutch/Flemish mannerism in Poland were Anthonis van Obbergen, Willem van den Blocke, Abraham van den Blocke, Jan Strakowski, Paul Baudarth, Gerhard Hendrik, Hans Kramer and Regnier van Amsterdam.

== Kuyavian-Pomeranian Voivodeship ==
Place	Building	Date of construction	Style and history	Image
Bydgoszcz	Church of the Assumption of Mary	1582–1645	Polish mannerism. Maybe intentionally or maybe because it was built by the same workshop, the church resemble Gothic churches in the city. Despite the medieval form the traditional Gothic elements - ogival arches, traceries and pinnacles were replaced with semi-circular arches and more subtle stonework. The buttresses remain, but gables were decorated in mannerist style with volutes. The Wojciech Łochowski's Chapel, built adjacent to the church in 1646, was decorated with typical horizontal attic.	
Chełmno	Town Hall	1567–1572	Dutch/Polish mannerism. The original building was built in 1298. The tower was added between 1584-1596. Architecture of the building had many influences - horizontal attic embellished with volutes is characteristic for Polish mannerism, the elevated gables and soaring windows are in Dutch style and tower decorated with corner rustication is typical for similar structures in Germany.	
Toruń	Granary	first half of the 17th century	Dutch/Polish mannerism. The current building replaced an earlier Gothic granary. The windows were decorated with a motive of a grain sack. The city was one of the largest centres of grain trade in Poland. In the 17th century, during the greatest bloom of the grain trade, there were over 100 granaries in the city. They were built of brick, and since the 17th century they were plastered.	
Toruń	St. George's Parish House	first half of the 17th century	Dutch mannerism. The construction of the building is Gothic, only the upper part have mannerist decoration. Facade of the house represents typical for Dutch mannerism decoration with ferrule ornament and merge of stone and brick elements. The top of the house is decorated with the Pomeranian Griffin.	
Włocławek	Włocławek Cathedral - Chapel of the Blessed Virgin Mary	1604–1611	Polish mannerism. Originally built in 1503, it was reconstructed in the mannerist style by bishop Jan Tarnowski. The architecture of the chapel, though inspired by Sigismund's Chapel was adapted and transformed according to Dutch patterns. The dome was hidden behind the balustrade and the walls were covered with a subtle corner rustication.	

== Podlaskie Voivodeship ==
Place	Building	Date of construction	Style and history	Image
Tykocin	Synagogue	1642	Jewish mannerism. The synagogue was built to replace wooden building. Late renaissance interior is decorated with Hebrew inscription and frescos. The building was covered with a late baroque mansard roof in the 18th century.	

== Pomeranian Voivodeship ==
Place	Building	Date of construction	Style and history	Image
Gdańsk	Artus Court	1616–1618	Dutch mannerism (architect Abraham van den Blocke), originally built in about 1350.	
Gdańsk	English House	1568–1570	Flemish/Southern German mannerism (architect Hans Kramer). It was built for Dirk Lylge. The facade was decorated in Flemish style by Willem Jacobsen of Brussels. Between 1640-1690 part of the house was rented by English merchants.	
Gdańsk	Ferber House	1560	Dutch mannerism. It was built for the city mayor Constantin Ferber. The attic is decorated with coat of arms of Poland, Gdańsk and Royal Prussia and four sculptures. Constantin Feber was prisoned in Łowicz by king Stephen Báthory because of his support for Archduke Maximilian during the 1575 election and rebellion against the king.	
Gdańsk	Golden House	1609–1618	Dutch mannerism (architect Abraham van den Blocke). Built for Johann Speymann, a wealthy grain trader and mayor of the city, and his wife Judith Bahr. The attic is decorated with sculptures depicting Cleopatra, Oedipus, Achilles and Antigone by Johann Vogt of Rostock.	
Gdańsk	Golden Gate	1612–1614	Dutch mannerism (constructed by Jan Strakowski to design by Abraham van den Blocke). The attic was adorned with allegorical sculptures of citizen's virtues: Peace, Liberty, Fortune and Fame (west side), Harmony, Justice, Piety and Prudence (east side). They were carved in 1648 by Peter Ringering to Jeremias Falck's design.	
Gdańsk	Green Gate	1564–1568	Flemish mannerism, inspired by the Antwerp City Hall (architect Regnier van Amsterdam). It was built to serve as the formal residence of the Polish monarchs.	
Gdańsk	Highland Gate	1586–1588	Dutch/Flemish mannerism, inspired by Sint-Jorispoort in Antwerp (architect Wilhelm van den Blocke). The frieze was adorned with coat of arms of the Polish–Lithuanian Commonwealth (center), Gdańsk and Royal Prussia.	
Gdańsk	Lion Castle	1569	Dutch mannerism (architect - probably Hans Kramer). Built for the Schwartzwalds family. The facade was adorned by Vroom of Haarlem. The house was named after two lion sculptures decorating the main portal. In 1636 king Władysław IV Vasa was entertained in the house during his visit to the city. It housed the Russian Centre of Science and Culture until its closure in 2026.	
Gdańsk	Neptune's Fountain	1617	Dutch mannerism (design by Abraham van den Blocke). The fountain was founded by the city councillors at Barthell Schachtmann's initiative. The Neptune's statue was cast in Augsburg by Peter Husen and Johann Rogge. In 1634 the fountain was encompassed by a fence decorated with gilded Polish Eagles, also designed by Abraham van den Blocke.	
Gdańsk	Old Arsenal	1602–1605	Dutch/Flemish mannerism (architects Anthonis van Obbergen, Jan Strakowski and Abraham van den Blocke).	
Gdańsk	Research Society House	1597–1599	Dutch mannerism (architect Anthonis van Obbergen). Built for Hans Köpe. The house is one of the largest mannierist constructions in Gdańsk (30m height). The main feature is 37m high tower with richly decorated lantern. In 1846 the house was purchased by Danzig Research Society.	
Gdańsk	Schumann House	1560	Flemish mannerism. Built for Hans Conert the Younger by unknown architect. The building was known at that time as the King's House. The top of the house is decorated with the sculpture of Zeus. Schumann House's architecture bears strong resemblance to Gildehuis der Kuipers (Coopers' House) and to Huis van de Schutters (Archer's House) in Antwerp.	
Gdańsk	Schlüter House	1638–1640	Dutch mannerism/baroque (architect Andreas Schlüter the Elder, father of Andreas Schlüter). Built for Hans van Enden. The facade is decorated with floral motives and medallions with effigies of Alexander the Great, Heracles, two Polish kings Sigismund III Vasa and Władysław IV Vasa, knights, thinkers and representatives of various human races.	
Gdańsk	St. Mary's Church - Epitaph of Edward Blemke	1591	Dutch mannerism (sculptor Willem van den Blocke). The central relief depicts the resurrection in the Valley of Josaphat according to prophet Ezekiel's vision (the dynamic of skeletons' transformation from bones to corpse is exceptional). The epitaph was crowned with a sculpture of death. Inspiration were epitaphs by Cornelis Floris - the construction bears resemblance to Epitaph of Dirk van Assendelft and his wife Adriana van Nassau in Grote Kerk in Breda (1555).	
Gdańsk	Town Hall	1559–1561	Dutch mannerism. The original 15th-century structure was reconstructed after a fire that broke out in 1556. In 1561 a gilded statue of King Sigismund II Augustus of Poland was installed on a pinnacle of rebuilt tower.	
Oliwa	Oliwa Cathedral - Kos Tomb	1599–1620	Dutch mannerism (sculptor Willem van den Blocke). Established by Mikołaj Kos, landlord in Żukczyn. Mikołaj and his son Andrzej were depicted wearing armours of Polish hussars.	
Słupsk	Pomeranian Dukes Castle	1580–1587	Pomeranian mannerism (architect Wilhelm Zachariasz Italus). The original castle (built in 1507 by duke Bogislaw X) was rebuilt in the mannerist style for duke John Frederick by Italian stonemasons. The new model of the residence with a staircase in the tower adjacent to the elongated rectangular building was later adopted in many noble residencies in the region.	

== Warmian-Masurian Voivodeship ==
Place	Building	Date of construction	Style and history	Image
Barczewo	St. Andrew's Church - Báthory Tomb	1598	Dutch mannerism (sculptor Willem van den Blocke with participation of his son Abraham). The tomb was established by cardinal Andrew Báthory to commemorate himself and his brother Balthasar. It feature the cardinal kneeling in the upper part of the tomb, while his brother was depicted sleeping in the lower part. The cardinal was newer buried in his tomb because he was murdered at Pásztorbükk near Sândominic shortly after becoming Prince of Transylvania.	

== West Pomeranian Voivodeship ==
Place	Building	Date of construction	Style and history	Image
Krąg	Podewils Castle	c. 1580	German mannerism. The castle was erected for Felix von Podewils to replace an earlier 15th-century fortress. It was built on a rectangular plan with four side towers. The architecture of the castle bears strong resemblance to Schloss Ahrensburg (1569–1585).	
Pęzino	Borck Castle	1600	German mannerism. The mannerist western wing of the Gothic castle was established by Matthias von Borck. It was adorned with richly decorated gable, dormers and chimneys. The walls were covered with subtle rustication and divided by cornices and windows.	
Szczecin	Pomeranian Dukes Castle	1573−1582	Pomeranian mannerism (architect Wilhelm Zachariasz Italus). The original castle (built in 1346 by duke Barnim the Great) was rebuilt in the late renaissance style for duke John Frederick.	
Tuczno	Tuczyński Castle	before 1581	Dutch/Polish mannerism. The castle was built for Stanisław Tuczyński and decorated with sgraffito imitating rustication. The decoration of gables and window bands (scrollwork) are typical for Dutch mannerism.	

== See also ==
- List of mannerist structures in Central Poland
- List of mannerist structures in Southern Poland
