= Siege of Danzig (1945) =

World War II battle fought in Danzig

- Part of East Pomeranian offensive
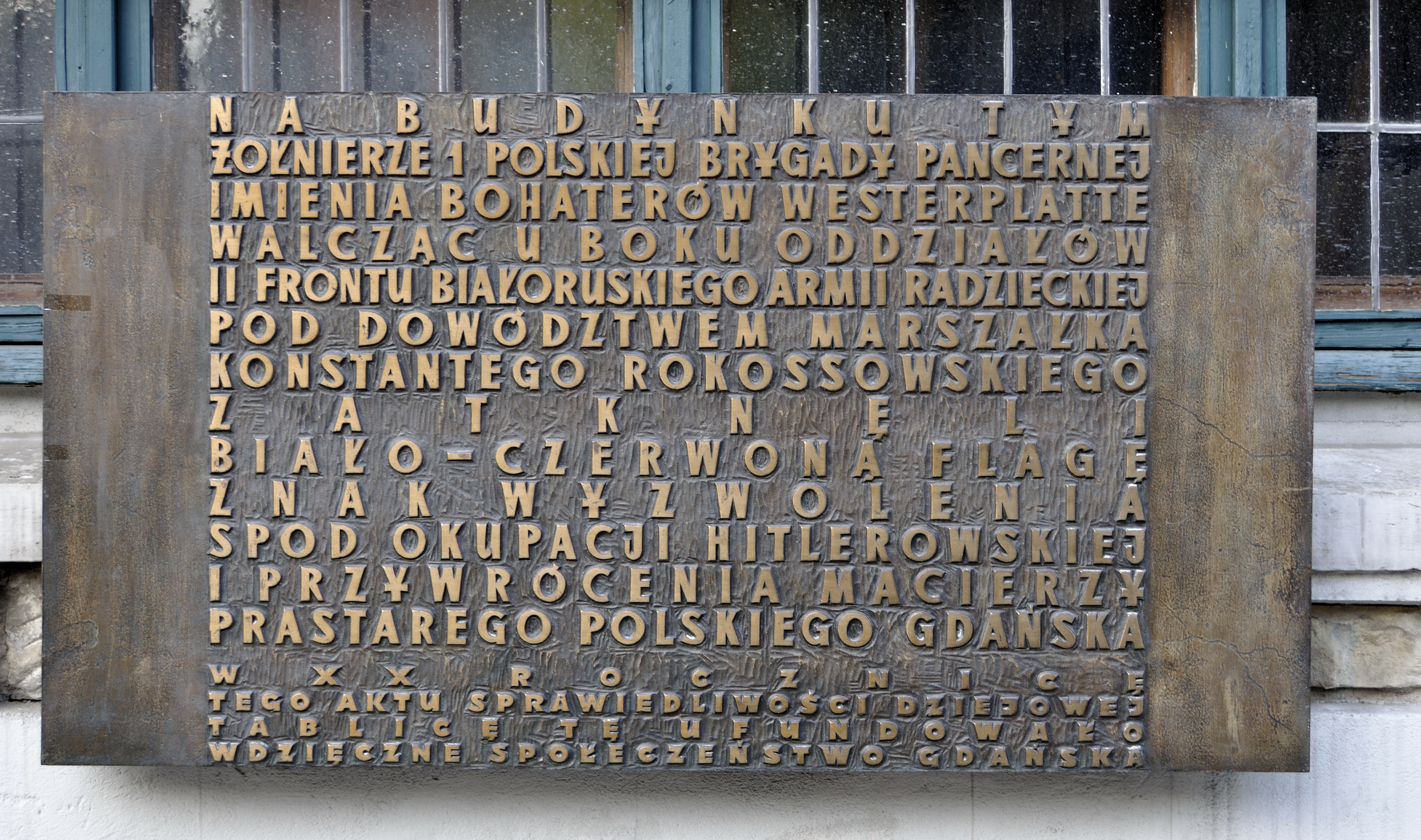
- Plaque commemorating the raising of the Polish flag by soldiers of the 1st Warsaw Armoured Brigade on the Artus Court in 1945
Date	15–30 March 1945
Location	Danzig (Gdańsk)
Result	Polish-Soviet victory: Mass deportation of Germans; Poland regains access to Danzig (Gdańsk)

Belligerents
Germany	Soviet Union: Polish Armed Forces in the East

Commanders and leaders
(Nazi Germany) Dietrich von Saucken	(Soviet Union) Konstantin Rokossovsky Stanisław Wojcicki

Units involved
2nd Army (Wehrmacht)	1st Warsaw Armoured Brigade

Casualties and losses
Unknown	Unknown

The siege of Danzig was the siege and capture of the city of Danzig (now Gdańsk) by the Polish and Soviet armies from Nazi Germany in March 1945, during the final months of World War II.

== Background ==
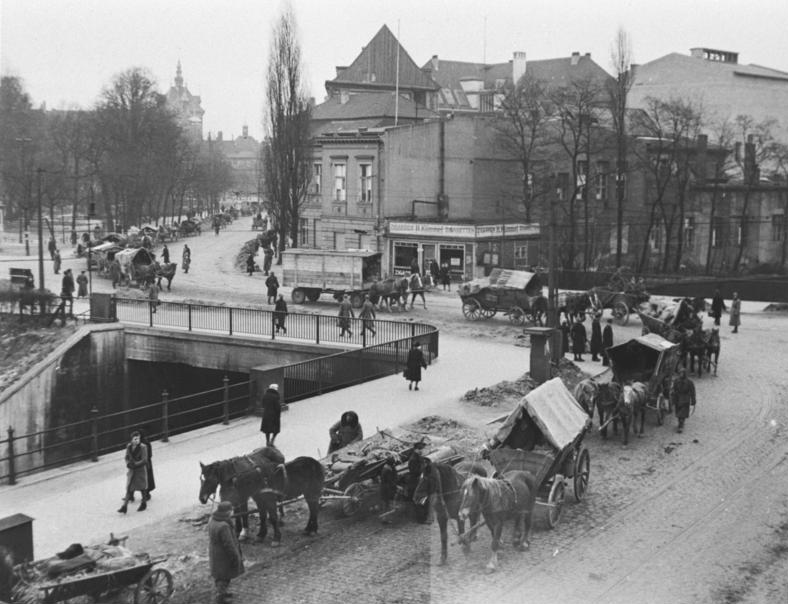
February 1945: German civilians flee Danzig.

On 14 January, the 2nd Belorussian Front started an attack against the 2nd Army from their garrison in Pułtusk, and in the next ten days, they advanced quickly up the Vistula. Danzig (Gdańsk) was eventually reached in early March, and as it was an important strategic location and the last German stronghold in the region, the Soviets started coordinating attacks.

== The battle ==
General Karl-Wilhelm Specht organised the defences. He was replaced by Dietrich von Saucken due to not agreeing to Hitler's policies on the defense of the city. The Soviets began massive bombardments of Danzig on 15 March. A paratrooper unit was deployed in the Oliwa Forests (Lasy Oliwskie) on 18 March, which provoked the Soviets to enter it and start bloody fighting in the forest. The fight continued until 25 March and resulted in a Soviet victory. It is regarded as the most intense and bloody battle of the siege.

On 21 March, the way to Nenkau (Jasień) was opened. On 22 March, the Soviets entered the city from the north (through Zoppot). On 24 March, Praust (Pruszcz Gdański) was taken, though it was not an important strategic move, as the areas nearby were flooded and the main offensives were in the north and west. After the takeover of Glettkau (Jelitkowo) on 25 March, Soviet tanks continued their advance towards Brösen (Brzeźno), though it was stopped by the 62nd Grenadier Regiment, which had recently entrenched in the region. Intense fighting broke out in the downtown in the next few days, though the combat within the city was more limited.

In the following days, Oliwa would become another centre for artillery as the Soviets advanced through the city. On 27 March the Soviets captured the Hagelsberg (Góra Gradowa) mountain near the city center, and Neufahrwasser (Nowy Port), an important port. Now, the gasworks in the Gdańsk Shipyard were only 100 metres away from Soviet-occupied territory. Fighting began in the remnants of German-held territory, and Śródmieście was burning. The lack of water and low accessibility caused the fire to continue, which did not give an advantage to either side. Mass bombardments and common Soviet attacks resulted in Red Army divisions in the centre of the city to the mouth of the Vistula and its surroundings. On 28 March, the Polish flag was raised atop Artus Court by soldiers of the Polish 1st Warsaw Armoured Brigade. The Germans finally surrendered on 30 March.

== Aftermath ==
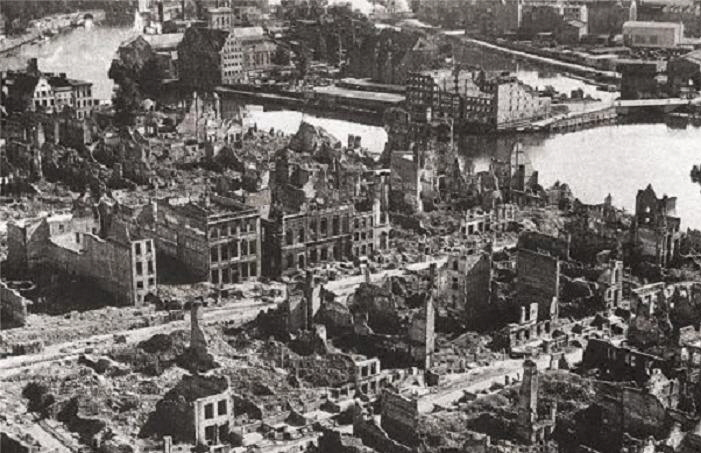
Destruction in Danzig/Gdańsk, 1945

Danzig was left as ruins. The bombardments, constant combat and continuous fires resulted in most of the city's landmarks being destroyed. On 30 March, the city, once again renamed "Gdańsk," was subject to the provisional government, which created the Gdańsk Voivodeship. Mass deportation of Germans from the city started shortly after the battle in order to raise the government's popularity and manifest the new administration system. By 1946, around 68% of the German population was gone.

In 1965, a memorial plaque was installed at the Artus Court to commemorate the raising of the Polish flag by soldiers of the 1st Warsaw Armoured Brigade on the Artus Court and the return of Gdańsk to Poland in 1945.
