= Artus Court =

Building in Gdańsk, Poland

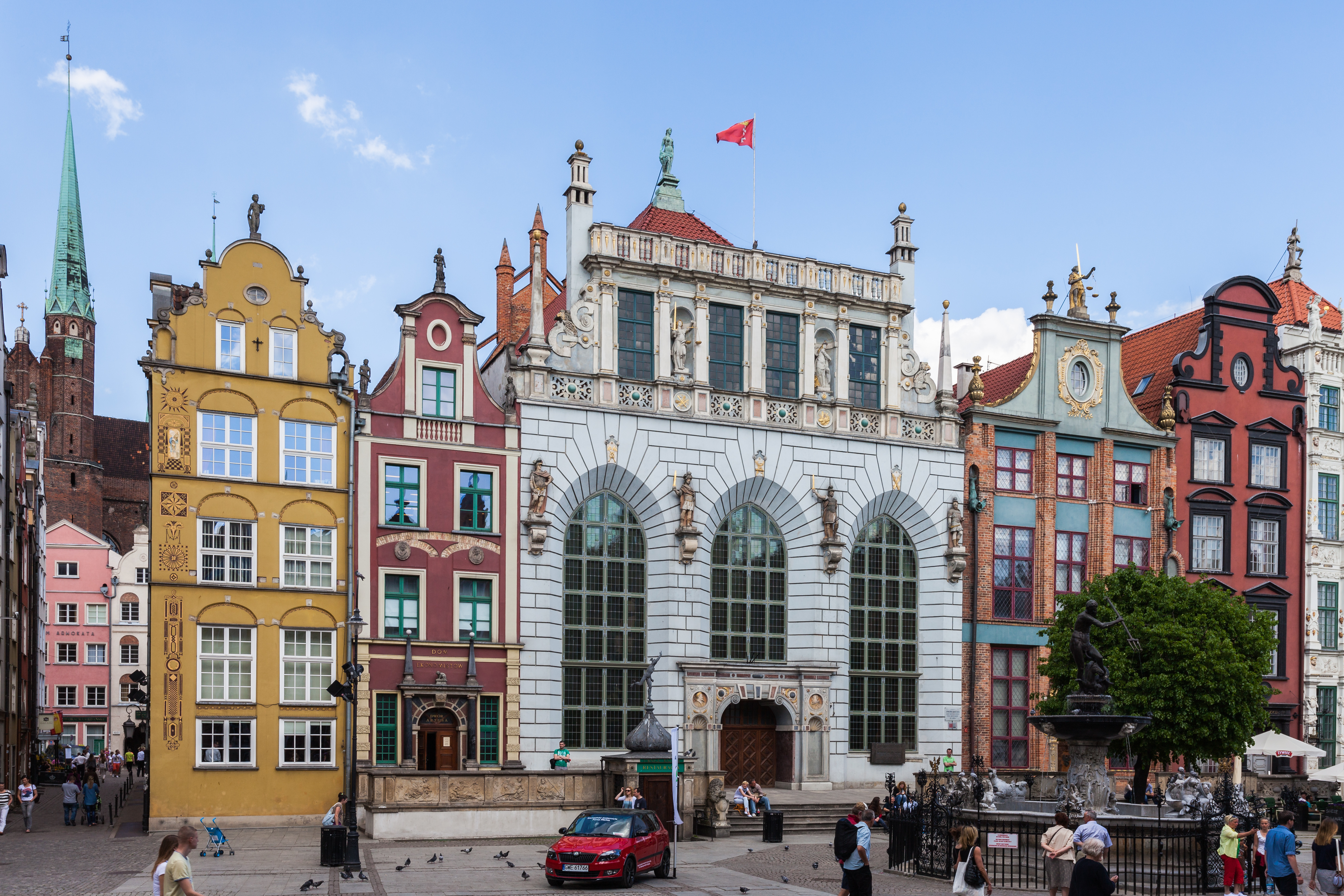
- Façade and main entrance to the Artus Court.

General information
- Architectural style: Dutch Mannerism
- Location: Gdańsk, Poland
- Coordinates: 54°20′56″N 18°39′13″E
- Construction started: 1476
- Completed: 1481

Design and construction
- Architects: Abraham van den Blocke (Mannerist reconstruction, 1616-1617)

Historic Monument of Poland
- Designated: 1994-09-08
- Part of: Gdańsk – city within the 17th-century fortifications
- Reference no.: M.P. 1994 nr 50 poz. 415

The Artus Court (Polish: Dwór Artusa; German: Artushof; formerly also Junkerhof) is a building in the centre of Gdańsk at Długi Targ 44, which used to be the meeting place of merchants and a centre of social life. Today it is a point of interest of numerous visitors and a branch of the Gdańsk History Museum.

== History ==
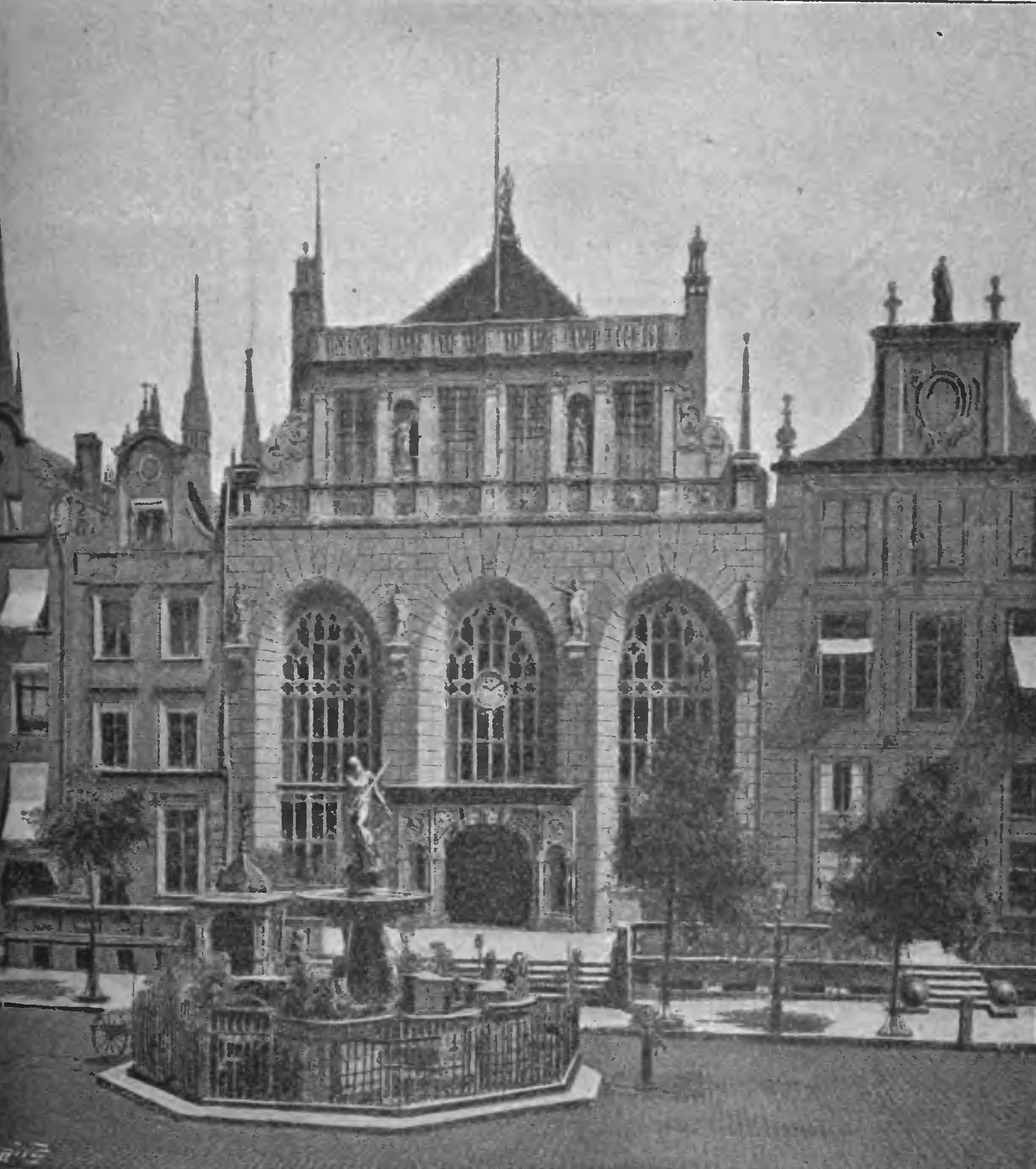
View from the early 20th century

The name was taken from the very popular medieval legend of King Arthur – a symbol of chivalry and gallantry. First in Britain and France, then in other European countries, his name was given to the houses where knights and aristocrats used to meet. In Poland Artus courts were founded and visited by bourgeoisie. In the early 14th century Artus Courts existed in the Hanseatic towns of Elbing (Elbląg), Riga and Stralsund and similar courts like the House of the Blackheads at Riga and Tallinn.

Initially, it hosted the Society of Saint George, which, however, moved out to its new seat near the modern Golden Gate in 1494. Afterwards, the Artus Court was home to six fraternities which took their names from benches, the Reinhold's, St. Christopher's or Lübecker, Marienburger, Biblical Magi's, Councillors' and the Dutch bench. These Confraternities were usually organized according to the merchant's or shipowner's trade relations, e.g. with Lübeck, the Netherlands or Poland and gathered the local elite - members of aristocracy and wealthy bourgeoisie. Already in 1492 merchants from England were allowed to appear at the Court. The entrance was banned for craftsmen, stall-keepers and hired workers. Wealthy merchants and visitors from abroad gathered here in the evenings. They paid for beverages in advance: 3 Schillings in the 17th century. Initially, at least in theory, talking about dealings was forbidden in the Court as the yard in front of it was designated for such purposes. Different performances took place in the evenings - musicians, singers, rope-dancers and jugglers came to amuse the visitors. Although they were officially banned, gambling, dice and card games as well as various bets were very popular. Normally only beverages and small snacks were served, but sometimes big feasts, which lasted even for a couple of days, were organized there. Especially at the end of the 17th century the feasts organized with great splendour began to turn into all-night drinking bouts. More and more complaints about the customs in the Court were made.

However, not only social meetings took place in the Court. In the 17th century librarians presenting books printed in Gdańsk appeared there, as well as painters with their art; the banning order for other tradesmen did not apply to them.

The heyday of the Artus Court falls into 16th and 17th century, but its history is much longer. The name of the building "curia regis Artus" (The Court of King Artus), which was built in the years 1348-1350, appeared for the first time in 1357 in the municipal note about the land rental from 1350.

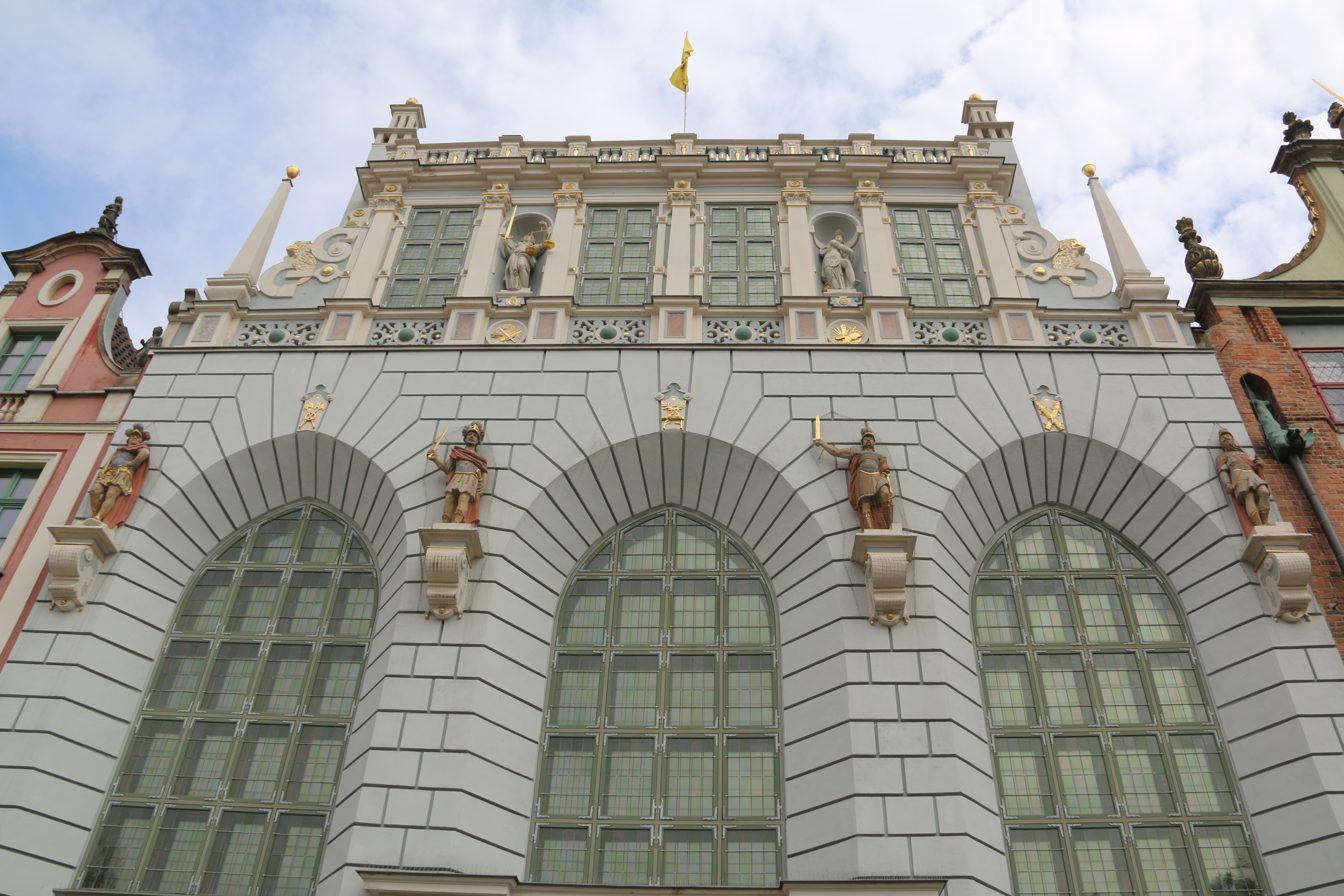
Fragment of the façade with statues of antique heroes Scipio Africanus, Themistocles, Marcus Furius Camillus and Judas Maccabeus, and allegories of justice and strength

Another building was probably built in 1379. Its traces were probably found during the archaeological excavations in 1991. This building of the Court burnt down in 1476 and 1477. It was reconstructed few years later, and in 1552 a new Renaissance façade was constructed on the occasion of the visit of King Sigismund II Augustus of Poland, which was once more rebuilt in 1617 by Abraham van den Blocke in the style of Dutch Mannerism. The building was adorned with statues of antique heroes (Scipio Africanus, Themistocles, Marcus Furius Camillus and Judas Maccabeus), allegories of strength and justice above and the statue of Fortuna on the gable. Medallions with busts of King of Poland Sigismund III Vasa and his son Władysław IV Vasa, who was a prince at that time, were placed on each side of the portal.

Throughout the Lutheran Reformation the Reinhold's bench organized an anti-Catholic carnival play in 1522, which was staged inside the court.

The Artus Court was visited by future Kings of Poland Władysław IV Vasa (then Prince as son of King Sigismund III) in 1623 and John II Casimir Vasa (then brother of King Władysław IV) in 1636.

During the final stages of World War II, on 28 March 1945, the Polish flag was raised atop Artus Court by soldiers of the Polish 1st Armoured Brigade, marking the end of German occupation in World War II.

== The interior of the Court ==
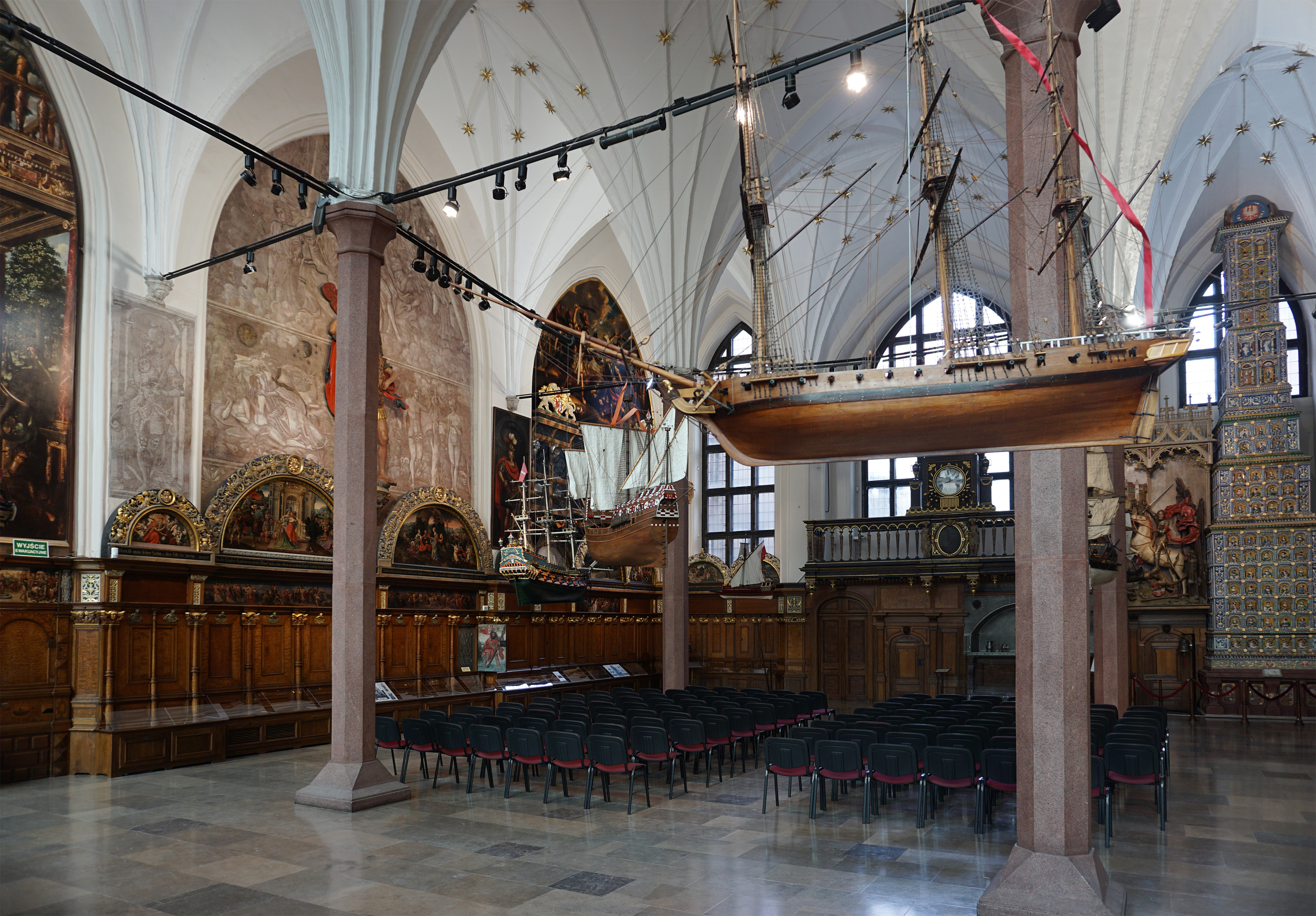
The interior of the Court.

The interior is one big Gothic hall. Since 1531 it has been completely redecorated - the walls have been covered with wainscot and friezes of mythological and historical character. The richly ornamented furniture and numerous paintings add to the splendour of the hall. The most famous ones are, among others, the works by anonymous artists from the late 15th century - Siege of Marienburg, The Ship of the Church, Orpheus among animals by Hans Vredeman de Vries from 1596 and Last Judgment by Anton Möller. The last painting caused much controversy, as the artist has used the scenery of the city and depicted some significant figures of the period as allegorical characters, such as Pride or Faithlessness. The hall was decorated not only with paintings but also tapestries, ship models, armours, coats of arms, or a cage with exotic birds.

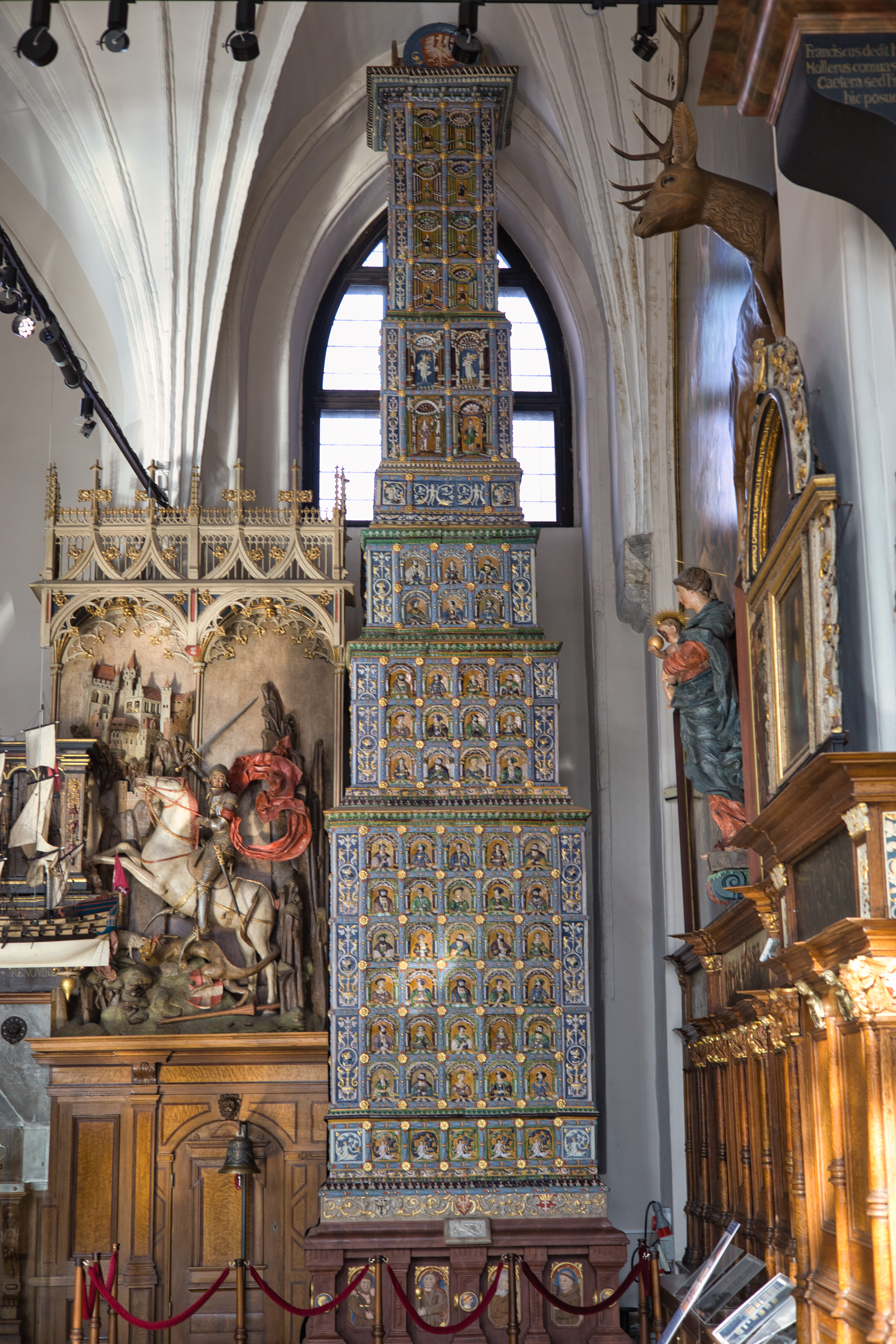
The great tiled heating stove

The other interesting decoration is the 11-metre high furnace made by Georg Stelzner between 1545-1546. It is covered with 520 tiles depicting the greatest European leaders, both the Protestants - supporters of the Schmalkaldic League, and the Catholics, among which are portraits of Isabella of Portugal and Charles V. It was topped with the coats of arms of Poland, Gdańsk and the province of Royal Prussia.

There were numerous depictions of King Casimir IV Jagiellon, under whose rule Gdańsk returned to Poland, and who granted various privileges to the city, ensuring its prosperity in the following centuries.

The Artus Court was designed as an exclusive meeting venue for the local elite. Only in 1742, at the request of the town's mercantile companies, the Council agreed to change the Court into the town's stock exchange and the city lost its most famous inn.

In 1755, a marble statue of king of Augustus III of Poland was placed in the Artus Court. It was removed by the Nazis in 1933 and destroyed during World War II. Also a banner with a portrait of King Stanisław August Poniatowski from 1790 was either destroyed or stolen during World War II.

== Artus Court today ==
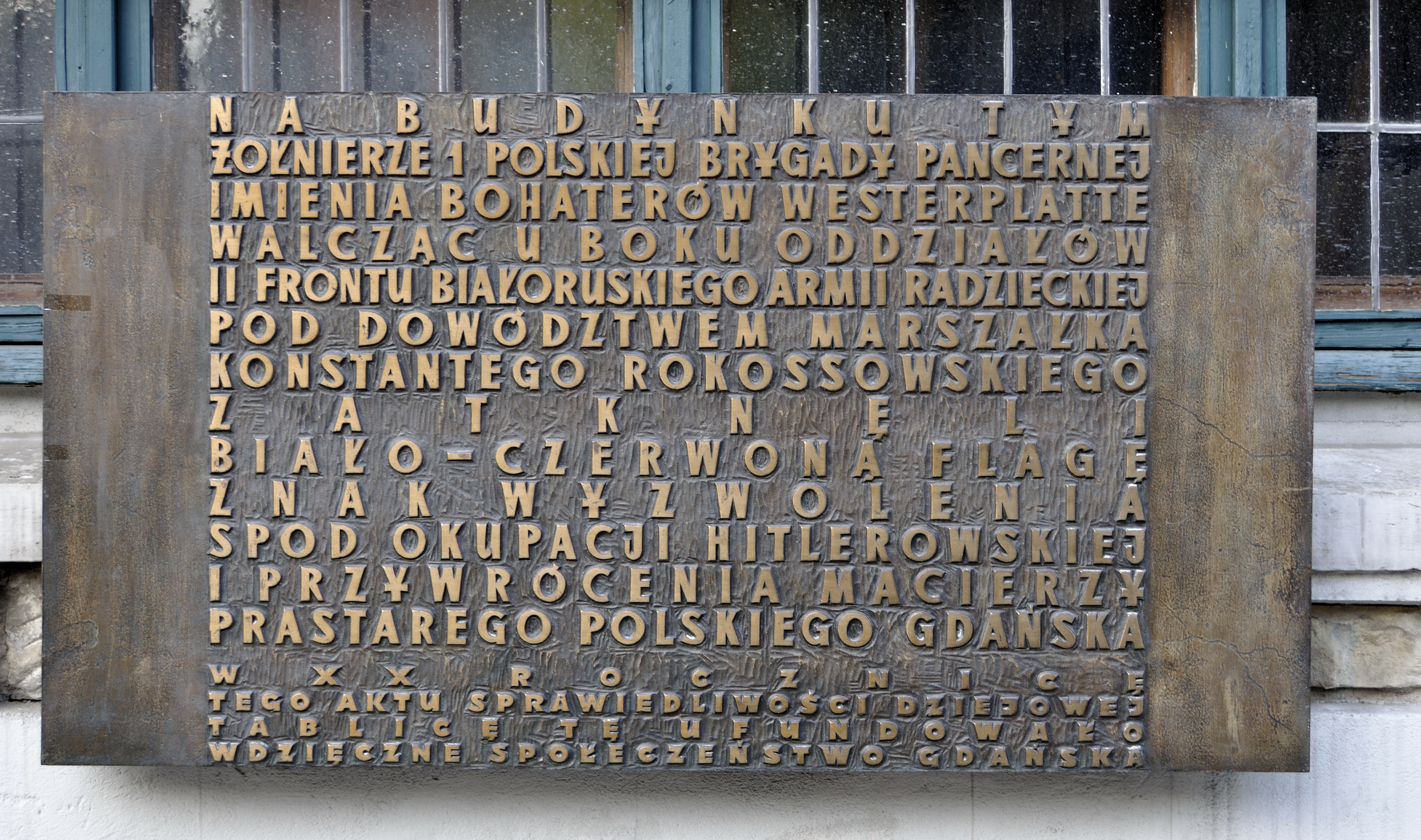
The memorial board from 1965 which commemorates the 20th anniversary of placing the Polish flag on the Artus Court by "soldiers of the Polish 1st Armoured Brigade of the defenders of Westerplatte fighting next to the troops of the Red Army's 2nd Belorussian Front under the command of Konstantin Rokossovsky as a symbol of liberation from Nazi occupation and restoration into the motherland of the ancient Polish city of Gdańsk".

Artus Court was seriously damaged during the East Pomeranian Offensive of the Red Army in 1945, but it was rebuilt after the war. A vast part of the equipment, including the furnace, was reconstructed with the use of materials hidden outside the city before the front moved into Gdańsk.

The building was entered into the register of monuments on 25 February 1967.

On the front wall of the Court there is a memorial board from 1965 commemorating the 20th anniversary of placing the Polish flag on the Artus Court by the soldiers of the 1st Armoured Brigade.

Currently the interior of the Artus Court is open for visitors - there is also the department of the Gdańsk History Museum.

== See also ==
- List of mannerist structures in Northern Poland

== Bibliography ==
- Bogucka, Maria (1997). Żyć w dawnym Gdańsku. Wiek XVI – XVII (in Polish). Warszawa: Trio. ISBN 83-85660-44-5.
- Jakrzewska-Śnieżko, Zofia (1972). Dwór Artusa w Gdańsku (in Polish). Poznań, Gdańsk: Państwowe Wydawnictwo Naukowe.
