= Abraham van den Blocke =

Prussian architect and sculptor (1572–1628)

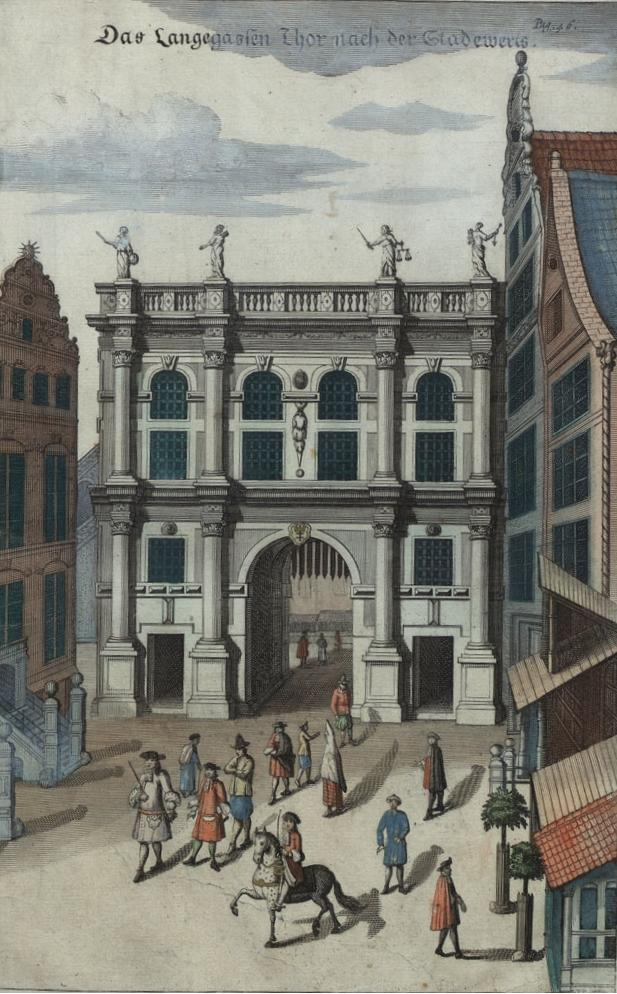
The "Golden Gate" built by van den Blocke in 1612-14

Abraham van den Blocke (1572 – 31 January 1628) was an architect and sculptor.

== Life ==
Van den Blocke was born in Königsberg (today Kaliningrad), Ducal Prussia, presumably the oldest of seven children of Dorothea and Willem van den Blocke, a Flemish sculptor and architect who had trained with Cornelis Floris in Antwerp. His brothers Isaak, Jacob and David were painters. In 1584 the family lived in Danzig (Gdańsk), where he was trained as a sculptor in his father's workshop. He moved to the Netherlands for further studies in 1590-95 and became a citizen of Danzig in 1596. In 1597 van den Blocke became a master and established his own workshop in 1598.

Van den Blocke died in Danzig in the same year as his father and brother Isaak, likely from an infectious disease.

== Work ==
In 1598-1611 he made a stone altar for the St. John's church and became a municipal architect in 1611. Van den Blocke built the Golden Tenement House in 1609, the Golden Gate (1612-14) and made a front elevation of the Artushof (1616-1617). In 1606-1613 he made elements for the Neptune's well and built the Royal Granary for King Sigismund III Vasa. He is the sculptor of several tombstones and epitaphs in St. Mary's Church.
