= Academy of Fine Arts, Gdańsk =

Art academy in Gdańsk, Poland

Academy of Fine Arts
- Akademia Sztuk Pięknych
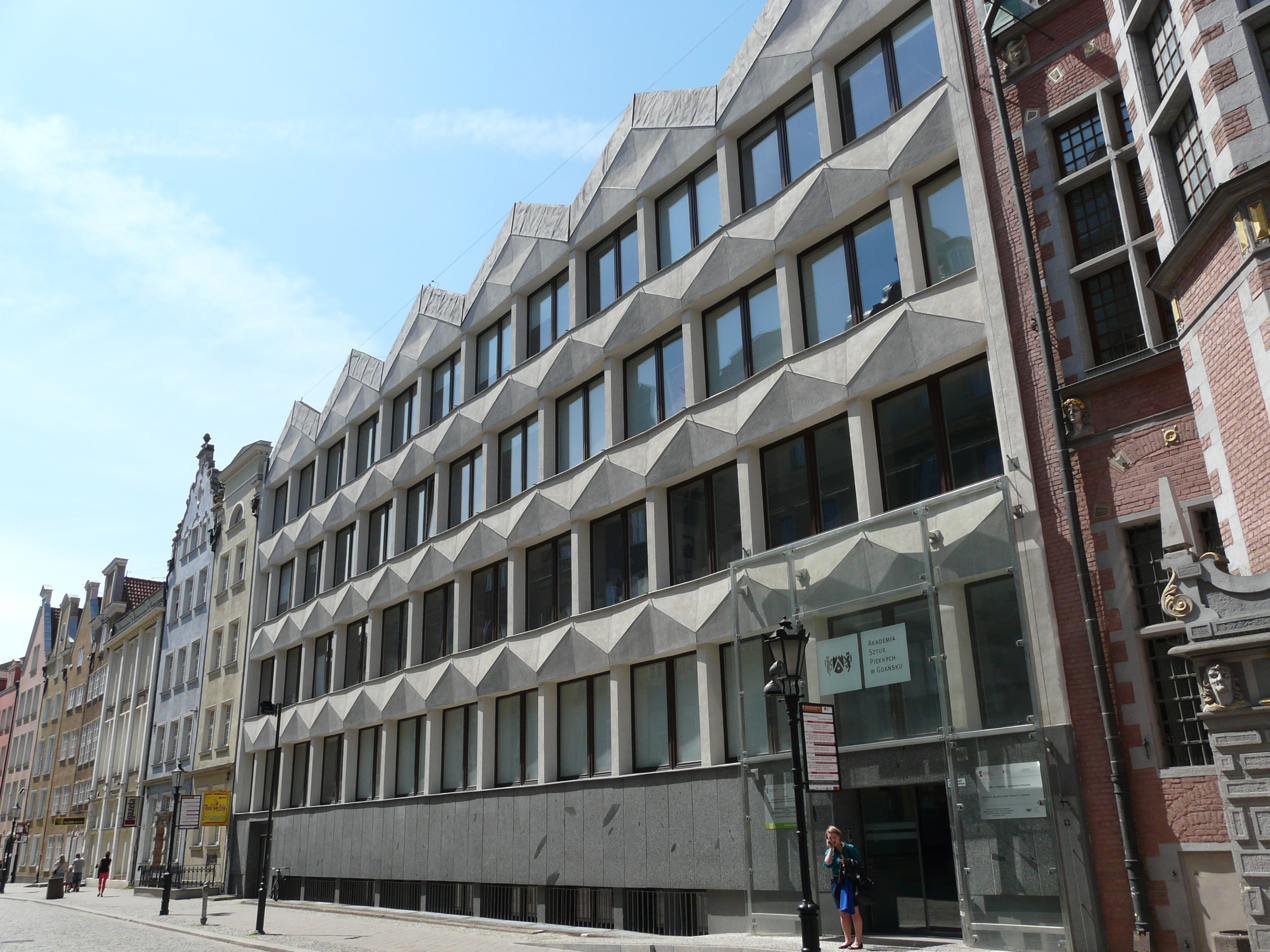
- Exterior of the modernist wing in the Main City
- Former names: State Institute of Fine Arts (1945); State College of Fine Art (1946-1996)
- Established: 15 October 1945
- Founders: Marian Wnuk; Jacek Żuławski
- Chancellor: Anna Wojtowicz
- President: Krzysztof Malicki
- Rector: Adam Świerżewski
- Vice rectors: Filip Ignatowicz; Małgorzata Jankowska; Marek Barański
- Students: c. 1000
- Location: 6 Targ Węglowy, Gdańsk, Pomeranian Voivodeship, Poland
- Campus: Urban
- Website: en.asp.gda.pl

The Academy of Fine Arts (Polish: Akademia Sztuk Pięknych, ASP) is an art school in Gdańsk, Poland.

== History ==
The Academy was founded in 1945 in Sopot, Poland as the State Institute of Fine Arts (Państwowy Instytut Sztuk Plastycznych), by seven artists including Marian Wnuk and Jacek Żuławski. On 15 October of that year 22 students became the first cohort to begin their studies. At the end of the year the institute was renamed as the State College of Fine Arts (Państwową Wyższą Szkołę Sztuk Plastycznych, PWSSP).

== Campus ==
In 1954, the headquarters of the PWSSP were moved from Sopot to Gdańsk, to the rebuilt Great Armoury. In 1968, the institution gained a new, modernist wing, designed by the College's professor Ryszard Semka. Since 1996 it has had the status of an Academy of Fine Arts. The Great Armoury is in the centre of the city with two prominent towers. The academy’s art collection is displayed in the Gallery of the Small Lecture Theatre and is made up of the work of artists who have been or are connected with the academy. Since 2017 there has also been a Design Gallery, in the English House.

It enrolls less than 1000 students.
