= Wnuk =

Wnuk ("grandson" in Polish) is a Polish surname. Notable people with the surname include:

- Edmund Wnuk-Lipiński (1944–2015), Polish sociologist and writer
- Lawrence Wnuk (1908–2006), Polish Catholic priest
- Marian Wnuk (1906–1967), Polish sculptor
- Oliver Wnuk (born 1976), German actor
- Rafał Wnuk (born 1967), Polish historian
- Witold Wnuk (born 1957), Polish musician
