= Torture Chamber, Gdańsk =

Torture Chamber
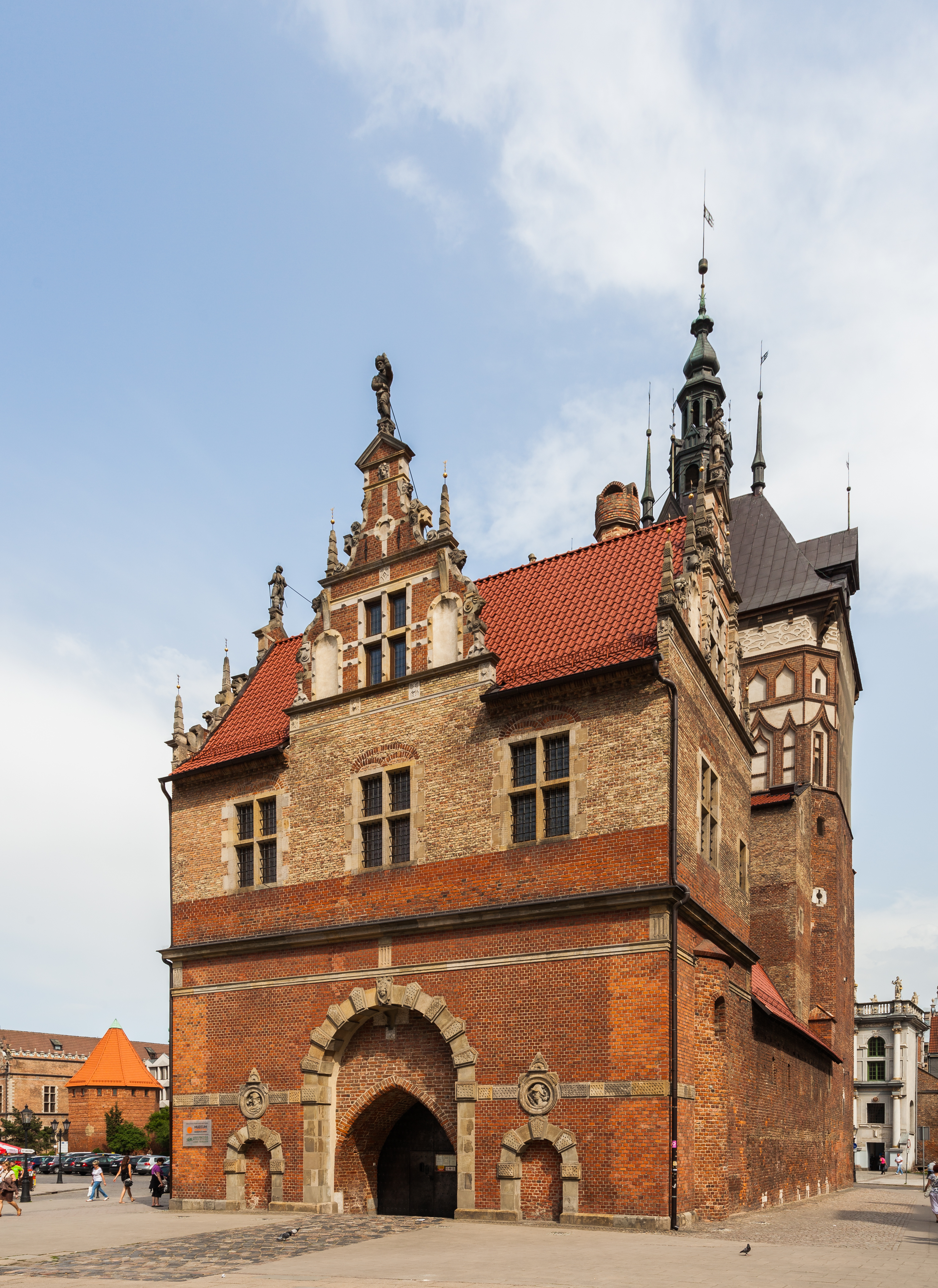
- The Torture Chamber as it appeared in 2013

General information
- Location: Targ Węglowy 26; Gdańsk, Poland
- Coordinates: 54.3498°N 18.6470°E
- Completed: 1410 (initial); 1604 (current)
- Owner: Gdańsk Museum

Historic Monument of Poland
- Designated: 1994-09-08
- Part of: Gdańsk – city within the 17th-century fortifications
- Reference no.: M.P. 1994 nr 50 poz. 415

The Torture Chamber (Polish: Katownia; German: Painkammer) is a building located in central Gdańsk. One of a series of city gates, it was constructed in the 16th century. A prison from much of its history, its name comes from the fact it was used for purposes of torture. It is on the regional heritage list.

== Architecture ==
The Torture Chamber consists of a red, two-sided roof. Below the roof, various busts are carved, sticking out of the walls, and at one of its ends is a distinctive, tall tower topped off with copper. One of the busts was partly destroyed in 1945, cutting off its head and uniquely revealing its internal anatomical features.

== History ==
In the 14th century, a building was constructed to accompany a gate of the growing city walls of Gdańsk, completed in 1410. When new fortifications, including the Highland Gate, were built there in the late 16th century, it became obsolete and was rebuilt and expanded by the architect Anthonis van Obbergen from 1593 to 1604. The building transformed into a prison, with several torture chambers and a courtroom.

The building remained the municipal prison until 1861. It was renovated from 1888 to 1890 and, in 1894, was acquired by the Danzig Association of Artists (German: Verein Danziger Künstler), eventually also becoming an antique shop, museum of torture devices, and, after 1932, International Red Cross location.

In March 1945, during the siege of Danzig, the building was lightly damaged. It was gradually reconstructed from 1951 to 1973. In 1973, the building's owner became the Gdańsk Museum, which set up a Criminology Workshop of the University of Gdańsk, which gathered the goods for the eventual founding of a prison museum, an idea that would never be realized.

In 2006, an amber museum opened in the Torture Chamber, which was moved in 2021 to the Great Mill. Now once again without purpose, various ideas have been floated for reconstructing the Chamber's interior spaces.
