= English House =

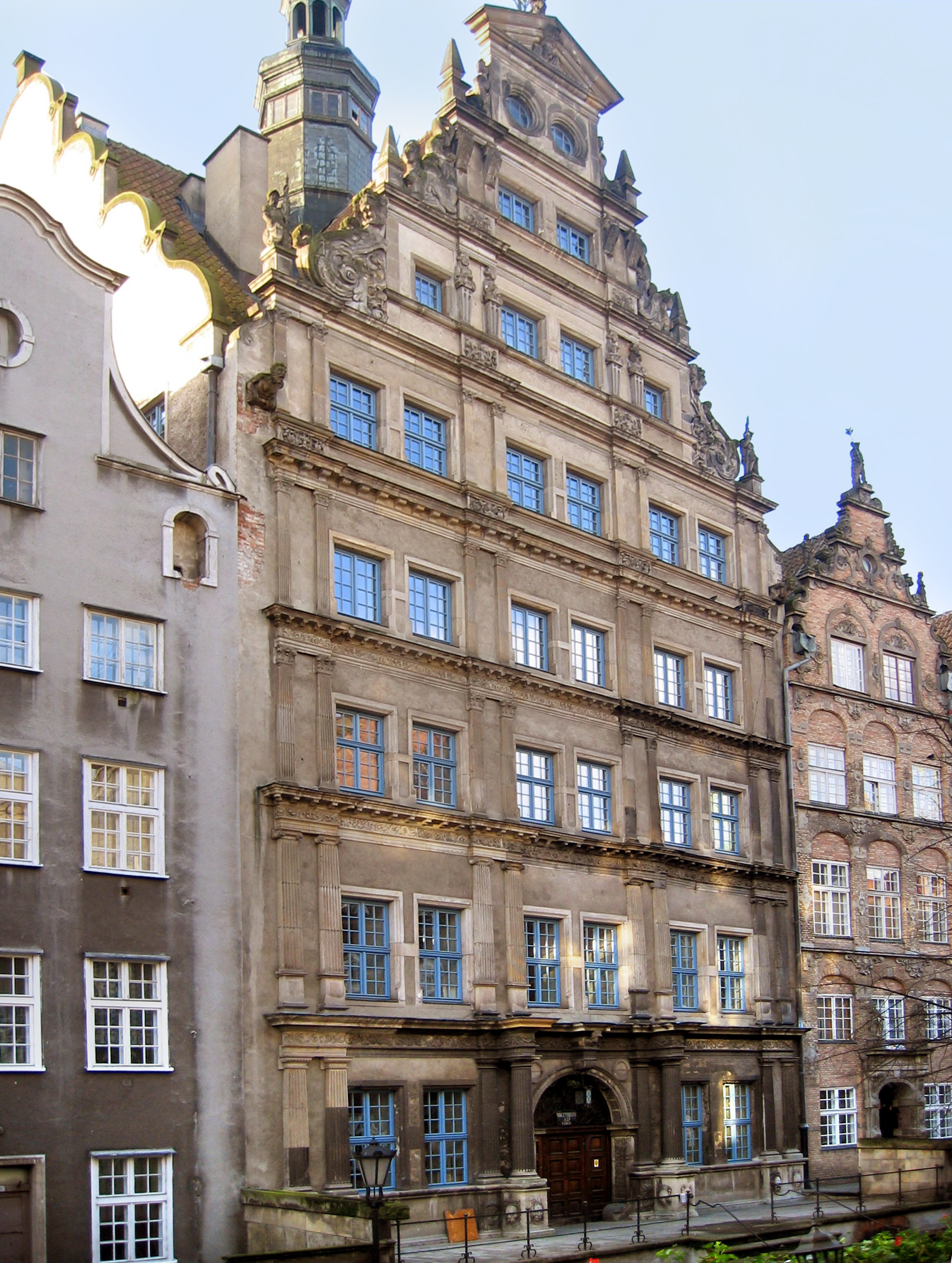
- The English House in 2005
- Interactive map of the English House area

General information
- Architectural style: Renaissance
- Location: ul. Chlebnicka 16; Śródmieście, Gdańsk
- Coordinates: 54.3486°N 18.6554°E
- Year built: 1568–1570
- Completed: 1570
- Owner: Academy of Fine Arts

Height
- Height: 30 metres (98 ft)

Technical details
- Floor count: 6

Design and construction
- Architect: Hans Kramer

The English House (Polish: Dom Angielski), also known as the Angel House (Polish: Dom Anielski), is a 16th-century Renaissance townhouse in Gdańsk, Poland. It is on the regional heritage list.

== Characteristics ==
The English House is located at ul. Chlebnicka 16, in the Main City. It has 6 floors, with a wide façade, subdivided by numerous pilasters in varied styles. Built in a Renaissance style, it measures 30 metres (98 ft) in height, making it one of the tallest buildings in the historic city centre.

== History ==
The building was constructed from 1568 to 1570 for the Westphalian merchant Dirck Lylge. Its architect was Hans Kramer, who created it alongside the sculptors Johann Schneider and Wilhelm Jacobsen. In 1684, with Lylge having gone bankrupt in 1674, the property was divided between the tenants Michael Rogge and Hildegarda Speyman. Up to the 1630s, it remained in the hands of the Rogge family, and between the 1660s and 1680s, it was owned by the Zirenberg and von Krockow families. From 1640 to 1690, parts of it were leased to English merchants to host social and religious meetings.

The two names of the house are believed to be derived from the similarity of the German words Englische (meaning English) and Engelische (the relational adjective for angel). In 1722, the townhouse became an inn, and transformed into a hotel in 1832. In 1912, plans were formulated to demolish the building, but the Society for the Preservation of the Monuments of Architecture and Art of Danzig, a notable local organization, raised funds to prevent such actions from being undertaken.

The city government took action alongside the Society, and the building remained in government hands up to 1945. From 1914 to 1920, tenants of the English House included a Jewish Masonic lodge, the Academic Association of Architects, and the offices of the United Brickworks. The building was renovated in 1912 and from 1924 to 1931.

After the war, the English House was heavily damaged, being repaired from 1970 to 1975, far later than many other historic buildings in Gdańsk. It was then acquired by the Academy of Fine Arts and today serves as a dormitory building, as well as the building of the Graphics Department. It underwent further renovation works in 2016.
