= Leon Schiller Memorial =

Sculpture in Warsaw, Poland

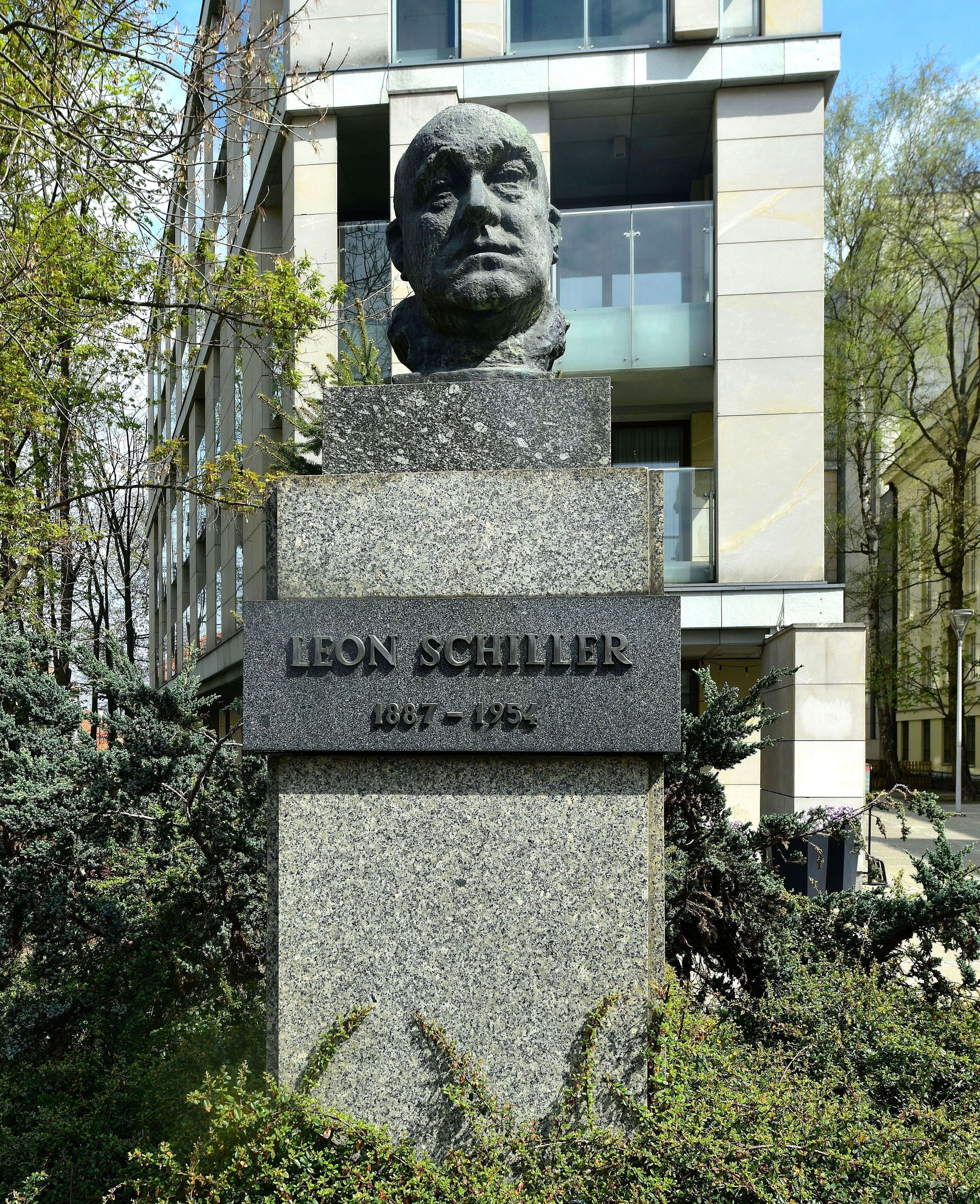
- The sculpture in 2019.
- Interactive map of Leon Schiller Memorial
- Location: Karasia Street, Downtown, Warsaw, Poland
- Coordinates: 52°14′18.712″N 21°01′10.42″E
- Designer: Marian Wnuk
- Type: Bust
- Material: Bronze
- Height: c. 3 m
- Completion date: 1961
- Opening date: 1988
- Dedicated to: Leon Schiller

The Leon Schiller Memorial (Polish: Pomnik Leona Schillera) is a sculpture in Warsaw, Poland, placed in front of the Polish Theatre, at the corner of Karasia and Oboźna Streets, within the North Downtown neighbourhood. It is a bronze bust depicting Leon Schiller, a 20th-century theatre and film director, and placed on a stone plinth. The sculpture was made by Marian Wnuk in 1961, and unveiled in 1988 at its current location.

== History ==
The sculpture was made by Marian Wnuk in 1961. It was unveiled in front of the Polish Theatre building in November 1988.

== Design ==
The monument consists of bronze bust of Leon Schiller, placed on a stone plinth. It is around 3-metre-tall.
