= Gdańsk Crane =

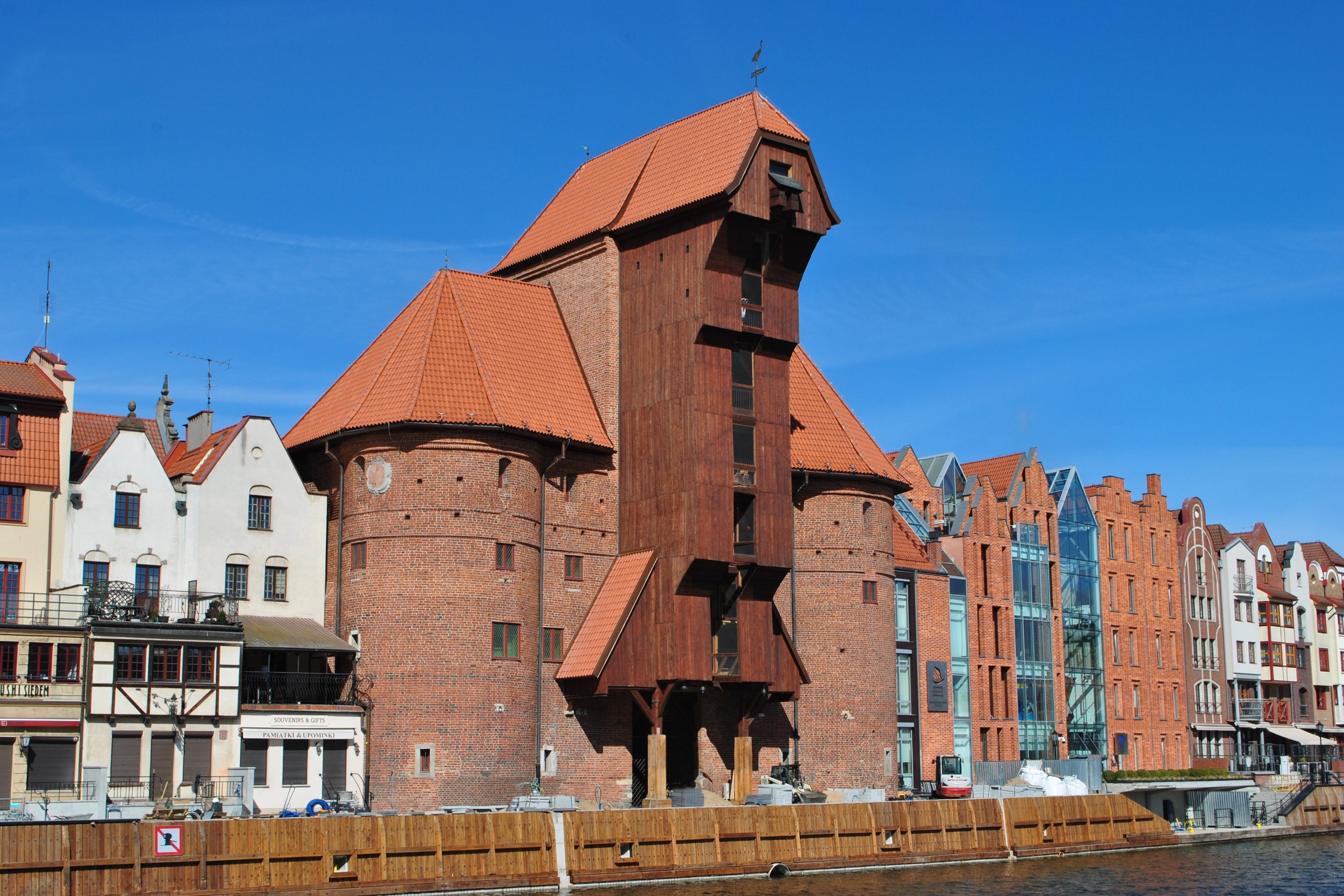
- The crane in April 2025
- Interactive map of Gdańsk Crane

General information
- Location: ul. Szeroka 67/68; Śródmieście, Gdańsk, Poland
- Coordinates: 54°21′2″N 18°39′27″E
- Year built: 1442–1444
- Completed: 1444
- Owner: National Maritime Museum
- Height: 30 m (98 ft)

Technical details
- Floor count: 4

The Gdańsk Crane (Polish: Żuraw gdański; German: Danzig krantor) or the Crane Gate (Polish: Brama Żuraw) is a 15th-century crane located in central Gdańsk, Poland, on the Motława river. One of the city's most well-known structures and tourist attractions, it was the largest port crane in medieval Europe and is presently found on the regional heritage list.

== Characteristics ==
The crane today measures about 30 metres (98 ft) in height, approximately 2 m (7 ft) more than the original construction. It has four floors and some small basements, and although its architecture was largely utilitarian, it did draw from some Gothic tradition. The crane consists of two tall and thick brick towers on both sides of a tall wooden crane supported by two (formerly four) pillars. Its rear, not visible from the Motława shore, is a flat brick surface.

The crane is located on the shore of the Motława, with the crane itself stretching out towards the river to load and offload ships' cargo. It is located at the point where Szeroka Street meets the Motława, at ul. Szeroka 67/68. It is one of several preserved "water gates" (Polish: bramy wodne) in the city, found at similar street termini (for a list, see City walls of Gdańsk § List of city gates). The crane has been repeatedly listed as one of the most iconic landmarks of Gdańsk and as a symbol of the city. It currently houses a branch of the National Maritime Museum.

== History ==
The first mention of a gate connecting Szeroka Street with the Motława comes from 1367, but any details about it are unknown. After a fire, in 1442, Danzig mayor Heinrich Vorrath began working to create a new city crane there. The Teutonic Order approved the request, with the crane, incorporated into the city walls, being completed by 1444. After being completed, it was overseen by a city government member known as the cranemaster, who had the responsibility of managing the state and finances of the crane. At this time, the Gdańsk crane was the largest port crane in all of Europe.

The crane's importance started to decline in the 19th century, and by the end of the century, it was primarily being used to lift the sterns of smaller ships to allow their propellers to be repaired. During the Siege of Danzig in 1945, the wooden crane, alongside 60% of the medieval defences around it, was destroyed. It was restored from 1956 to 1959, whilst the old lifting mechanisms were reinstalled in 1966. From 1962 to 1965, a museum was constructed within its interiors which would eventually come to be owned by the National Maritime Museum.

In recent years, the crane has been repeatedly renovated. Its first renovation occurred in 2007, followed by smaller interior renovations in 2015 and 2017 and then a large renovation beginning in 2020. After numerous delays, that renovation ended in 2024, with the crane being reopened on 30 April 2024.
