= Museum-digital =

Museum digitization project

museum-digital
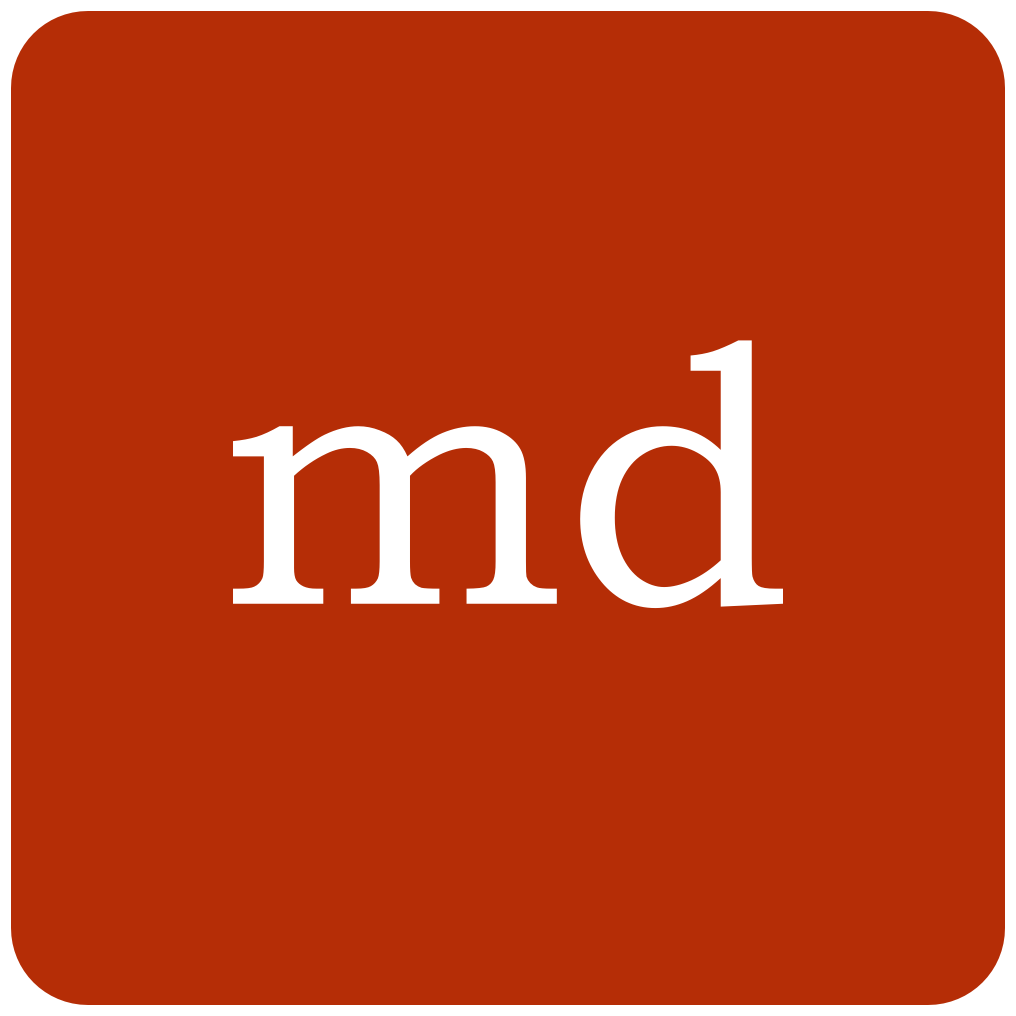
- Commercial?: No
- Location: Germany, Hungary
- Established: January 2009
- Website: www.museum-digital.org

museum-digital is a project of museums to collaboratively publish their data online. Increasingly, it has also been targeting inventorization. Having published information on over 281,000 objects in Germany and 95,000 objects in Hungary, the project's work is currently focused on these countries.

== Concept ==
museum-digital offers museums the option to publish their information, especially object information, online. The platform displays both textual and visual information on the objects. Once a respective object has been set public, its information is available for public reuse according to the given license.

To enrich search results, museum-digital makes use of controlled vocabularies, which are shared between the different instances. The larger international versions have own, language-specific controlled vocabularies.

Museums from different regions of Germany have bound together in regional instances of museum-digital, organized through their respective museum associations. These regional instances are aggregated into a national instance, where information can be searched across regions.

Furthermore, museum-digital can serve museums as an aggregator for data to be exported to the Deutsche Digitale Bibliothek and the Europeana.

== History ==
The project was founded in 2009, based on an initiative of the "AG Digitalisierung" (Working Group Digitization) of the Museum Association of Saxony-Anhalt. In October of the same year 187 museums from within Germany were participating and 15,400 objects were available online.

Until 2016, a number of additional regional, international (Hungary, Brazil, Indonesia), and topical ("agrargeschichte" [History of Agriculture]) instances were created

Currently, 572 museums in Germany are participating in the project, with over 281.000 objects

In Saxony-Anhalt and Rhineland-Palantine, the project has enjoyed funding by the respective states.

== Development ==
The different tools museum-digital provides are created using PHP, JavaScript and MySQL databases. To meet the requirements of internationally used software, all tools are multilingual or at least available in German and English.

Conceptually innovative developments, such as the quality control tool PuQi or the overview pages for establishing relationships between people based on museum objects, are presented to the scientific community using presentations and articles

=== Main Software Projects ===
==== Frontend of museum-digital ====
The frontend is the primary public interface to the different instances of museum-digital. This is where museum and museum object information are published. While it was originally limited to the presentation of data on objects, museums, and collections, it has been extended to cover object groups and exhibitions and events taking place at a given museum.

==== musdb ====
musdb is the input interface of museum-digital. Originally developed only as a graphical interface for entering publication data, it has since turned into a collection management system.

=== Secondary Projects ===
==== Themator: Topics Module ====
The Themator is the topics module of museum-digital. Using the themator, users can create topic pages and digital exhibitions, which are primarily focused on a contiguous and structured narratives. Each page or part of the narrative can then be linked to objects from the instances of museum-digital.

==== nodac and md:term ====
nodac is the initiatives tool for editing controlled vocabularies. These controlled vocabularies can then be browsed and re-used through md:term, which offers them in a human-readable way along with JSON and SKOS APIs.

==== Handbook ====
The Handbook is a website, on which participants collect and publish information documenting the history and functionalities of museum-digital.
