= Great Armoury =

Former arsenal in Śródmieście, Gdańsk

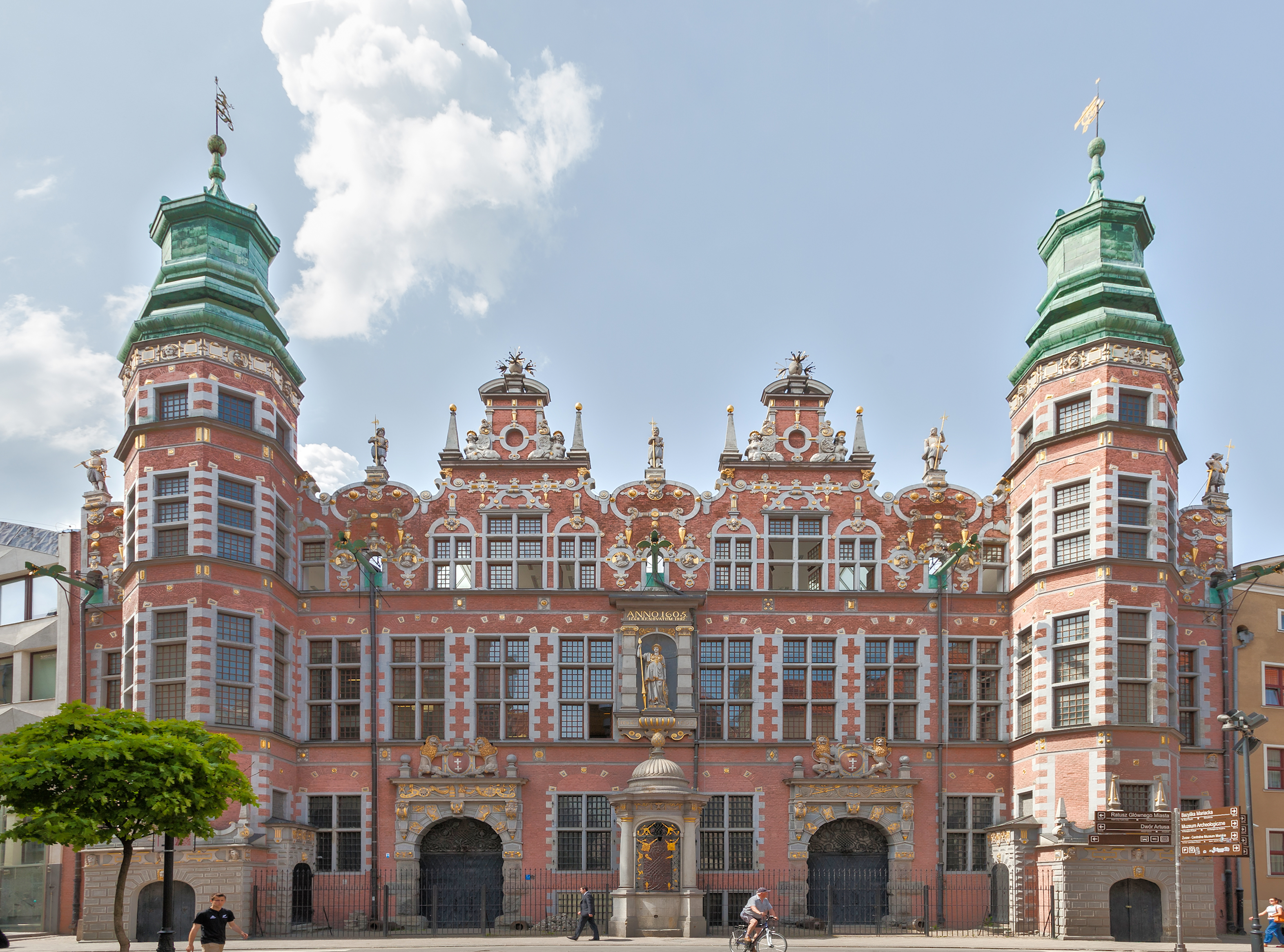
- The Great Armoury in 2013
- Interactive map of the Great Armoury area

General information
- Architectural style: Mannerist
- Location: Targ Węglowy 4 Śródmieście, Gdańsk, Poland
- Coordinates: 54.3507°N 18.6491°E
- Year built: 1600–1605
- Completed: 1605
- Owner: Academy of Fine Arts

Technical details
- Floor count: 3

Design and construction
- Architect: Anthonis van Obbergen

Historic Monument of Poland
- Designated: 1994-09-08
- Part of: Gdańsk – city within the 17th-century fortifications
- Reference no.: M.P. 1994 nr 50 poz. 415

The Great Armoury (Polish: Wielka Zbrojownia; German: Großes Zeughaus) is a 17th-century former arsenal beside the Targ Węglowy in Gdańsk, Poland, today housing the Academy of Fine Arts. It is on the regional heritage list. It is considered the greatest example of Mannerist architecture in Gdańsk.

== Characteristics ==
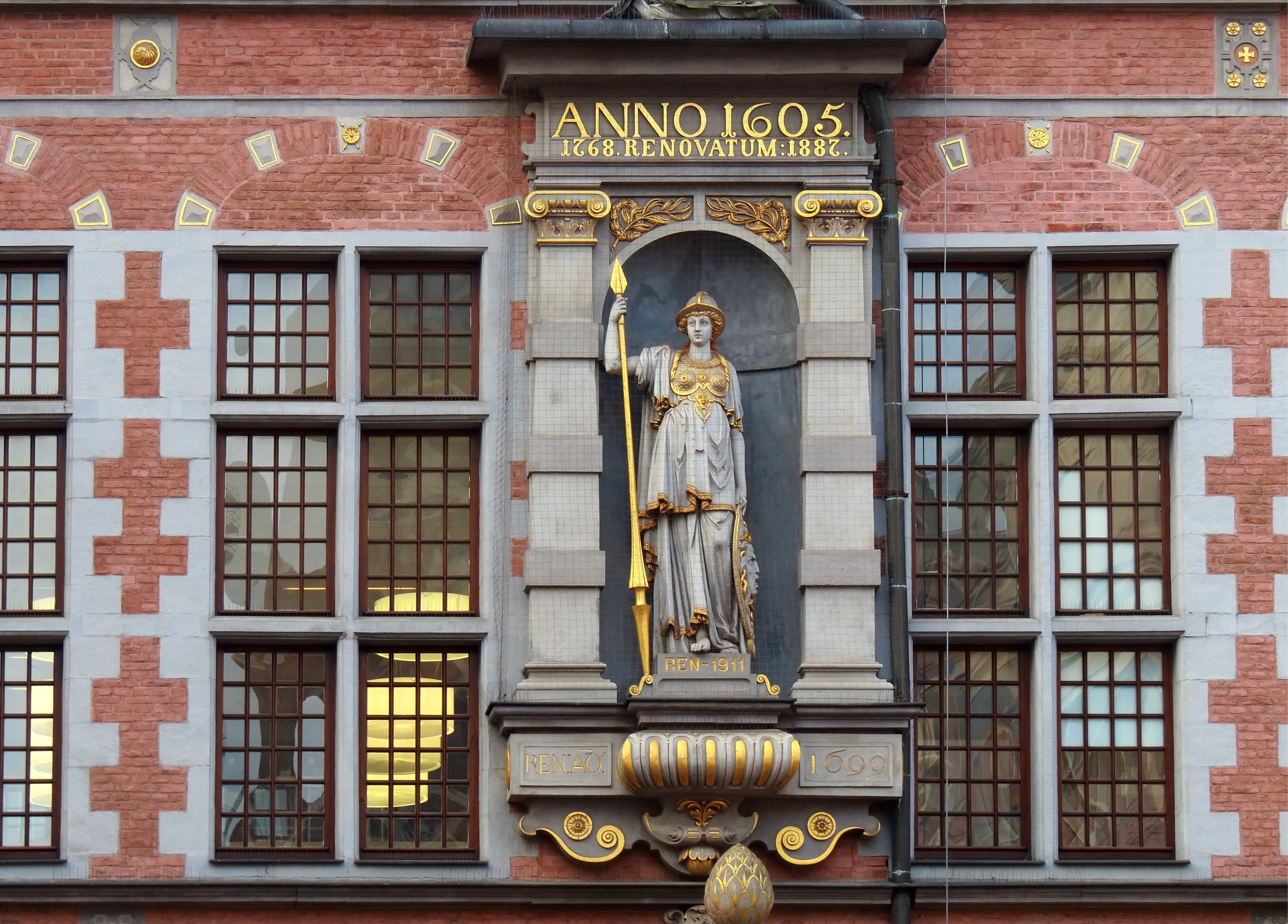
Statue of Athena on the facade

The Great Armoury is beside the Targ Węglowy (Coal Market). Constructed in a Mannerist style, it is a signature feature of the Targ Węglowy, and was inspired by the Vleeshal in Haarlem. It has 3 floors and an attic, whilst the top of its façade are four gables, and the accompanying separation between parts of the building makes it appear as if the building is subdivided into four different constructions. The top of the façade is decorated with bas-reliefs of Athena, the ancient Greek goddess of warfare; soldiers of the city of Gdańsk and exploding cannonballs; and a carving of Ivan Pidkova.

== History ==
The Great Armoury was built from 1600 to 1605; its architect was Anthonis van Obbergen and construction was overseen by Hans Strakowski. It was used as an arsenal up to 1793, when the city was annexed by the Kingdom of Prussia in the Second Partition of Poland. During the time of the First Free City of Danzig, it was used as a French military hospital. After the dissolution of the First Free City, it was mostly used for storing old firearms, also hosting a collection of portrait paintings of kings of Poland moved from the Main City Hall up to c. 1866. In 1919, the Zeughaus-Automat, a restaurant housing several vending machines for purchasing ready-made meals, opened on the building's first floor.

In 1922, the Great Armoury was taken by the city of Danzig, and the following year, the ground floor was transformed into a shopping arcade, as described by Nobel Prize-winning author Günter Grass in The Tin Drum.

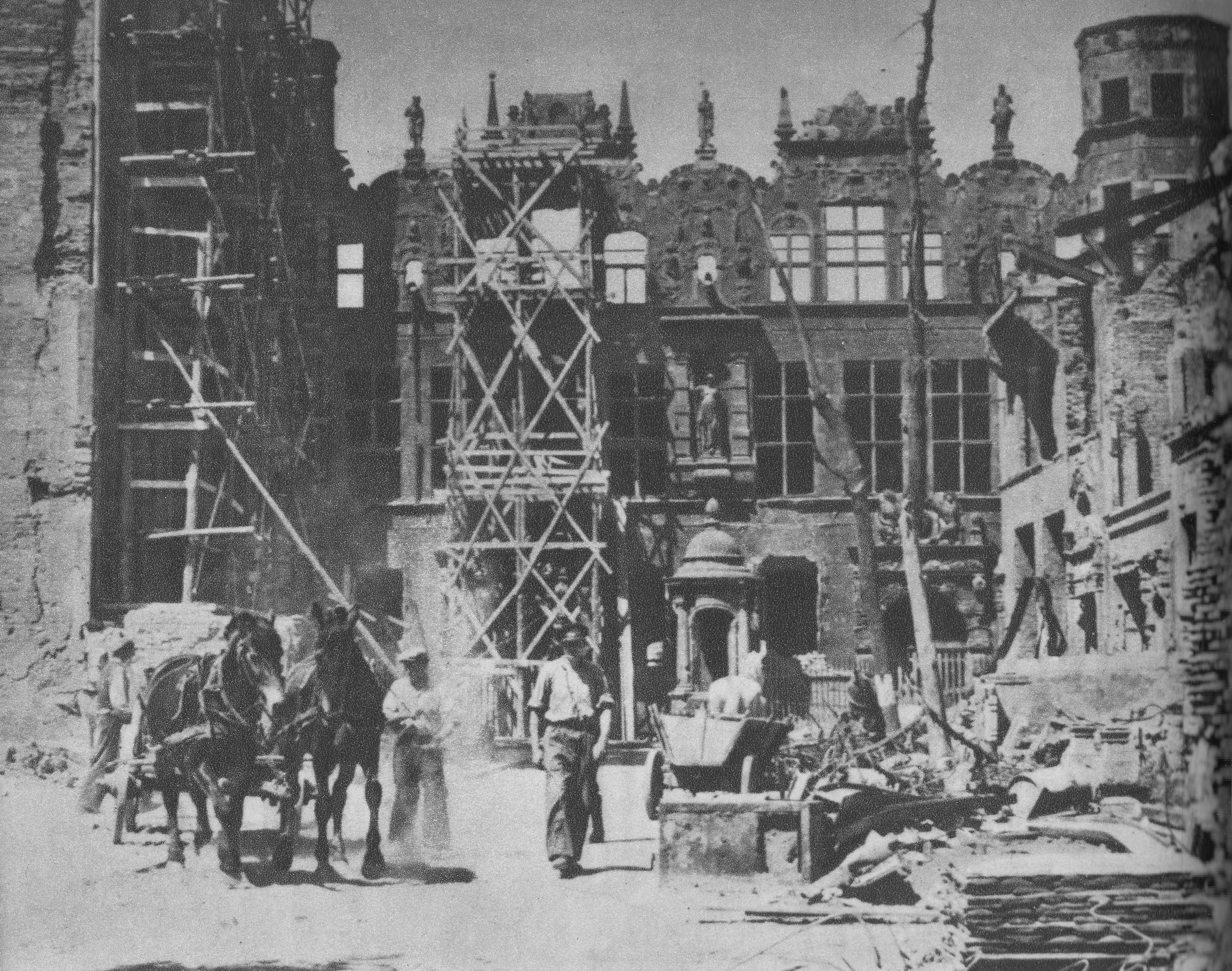
Reconstruction after World War II

In 1945, it was severely damaged. It was rebuilt from 1947 to 1951. In 1951, an art exhibition was displayed in the building, which, in 1952, was handed over to the Academy of Fine Arts; the Academy moved into the Great Armoury in 1954. The Armoury's ground floor was again repurposed into a trade passage, which lasted until 2007. After the closure of the trade passage, the Academy began looking for investors to buy and use said passage, but few presented favourable arrangements.

The former trade passage was opened to art exhibitions in 2012 and, as of 2025, remains in this function.
