= Leib Osnos Tenement =

Tenement house in Warsaw, Poland

Tenement house of Leib Osnos in Warsaw
- Kamienica Lejba Osnosa w Warszawie
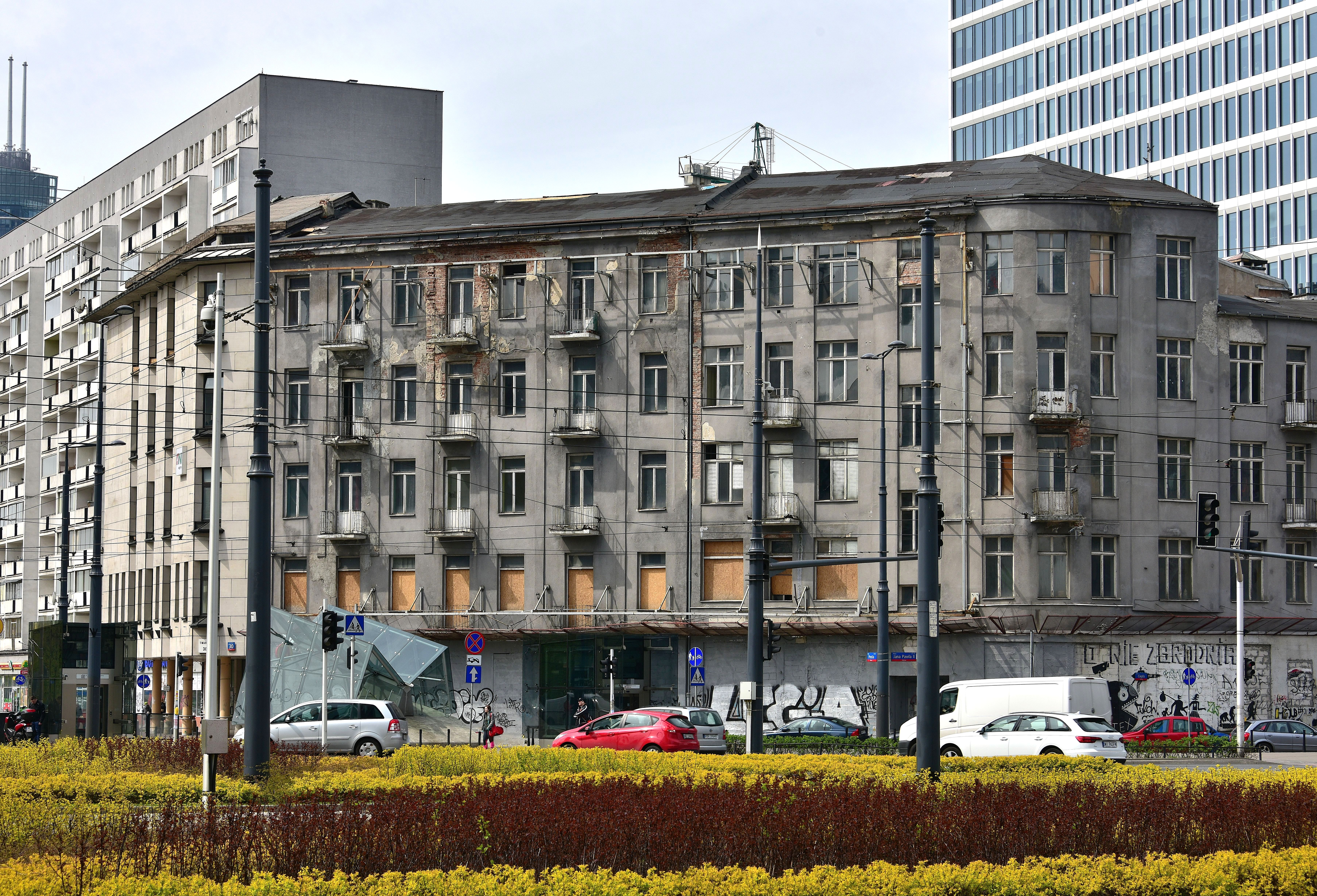
- Interactive map of the Tenement house of Leib Osnos in Warsaw area

General information
- Location: Twarda 28, Warsaw, Poland
- Coordinates: 52°14′00.0″N 20°59′49.5″E
- Completed: 1911

The Tenement house of Leib Osnos in Warsaw (Polish: Kamienica Lejba Osnosa w Warszawie) is a tenement house located at 28 Twarda Street in the Wola district of Warsaw.

== History ==
The tenement house was built in 1911. During World War II from 1940 to 1942 it was located in the Warsaw Ghetto. In 2009 all the residents of the tenement were evicted.

Inside the tenement there are remains of a lot architectural decoration. In 2019, it was entered in the register of historical monuments.
