= LOT Building =

Building in Śródmieście, Gdańsk, Poland

- Budynek LOT-u
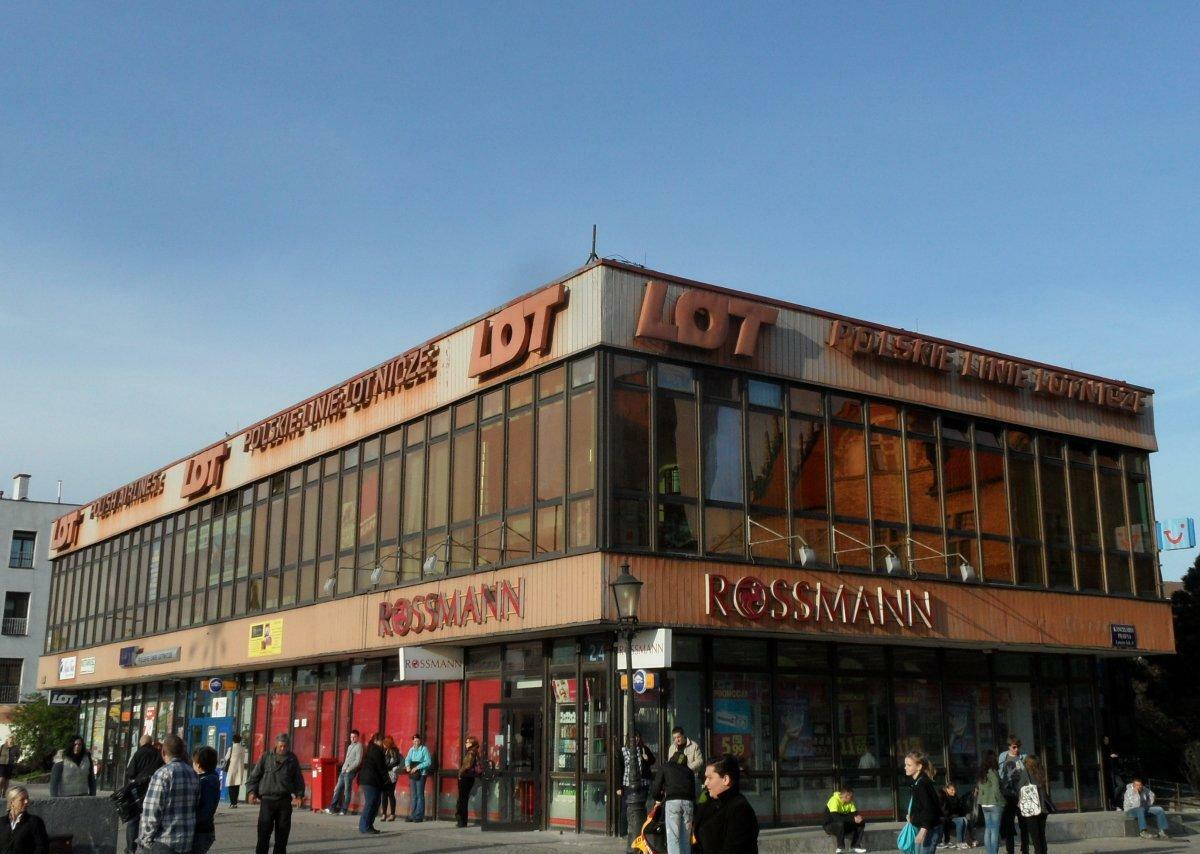
- The LOT Building, 2011

General information
- Architectural style: Modern
- Address: ul. Wały Jagiellońskie 2/4; Śródmieście, Gdańsk
- Coordinates: 54.3503°N 18.6466°E
- Year(s) built: 1959–1961
- Completed: 1961
- Owner: Elfeko S.A.

Technical details
- Floor count: 2
- Floor area: 1,480 m^{2} (15,900 sq ft)

Design and construction
- Architect(s): Lech Kadłubowski

The LOT Building (Polish: Budynek LOT-u), originally known as the Furniture House (Polish: Dom Meblowy), is a modernist pavilion and office building in Gdańsk, Poland, located at 2 and 4 Wały Jagiellońskie Street, within the Śródmieście district. It was first built as a furniture store, later being owned by LOT Polish Airlines. It is on the heritage list of the gmina of Gdańsk.

== History ==
The building was built on the grounds of Danziger Hof, a hotel built in the 19th century. It was designed by architect Lech Kadłubowski. Construction began in 1959 and concluded in 1961, officially being opened on 27 November 1961 and nicknamed the "glass palace" (Polish: szklany pałac) by the media. The store inside the building was known for selling modern and comfortable furniture. In 1979, it was rebuilt for the purposes of LOT Polish Airlines, which set up its local offices inside of it. It has since undergone various stylistically controversial changes.

Since the start of the 21st century, suggestions have been put forward to replace the pavilion with a new building, including a proposal to rebuild the old Danziger Hof hotel. In 2012, the company Elfeko S.A. bought the building for 12.5 million zł to construct a hotel which would be completed by 2017. An architectural design competition was held to determine a new design for said hotel; however, ultimately, no winner was chosen and the proposed design resulted in the voivodeship heritage conservator protecting from demolition it on account of its architectural distinctiveness in January 2020.

== Architecture ==
The building is located between the Jagiellonian Walls and Targ Węglowy, close to the Brama Wyżynna. Most of its exterior is covered by glass. It has a floor area of 1,480 m^{2} (15,900 sq ft).
