= Ostrowo Szlacheckie Palace =

- Pałac w Ostrowie Szlacheckim
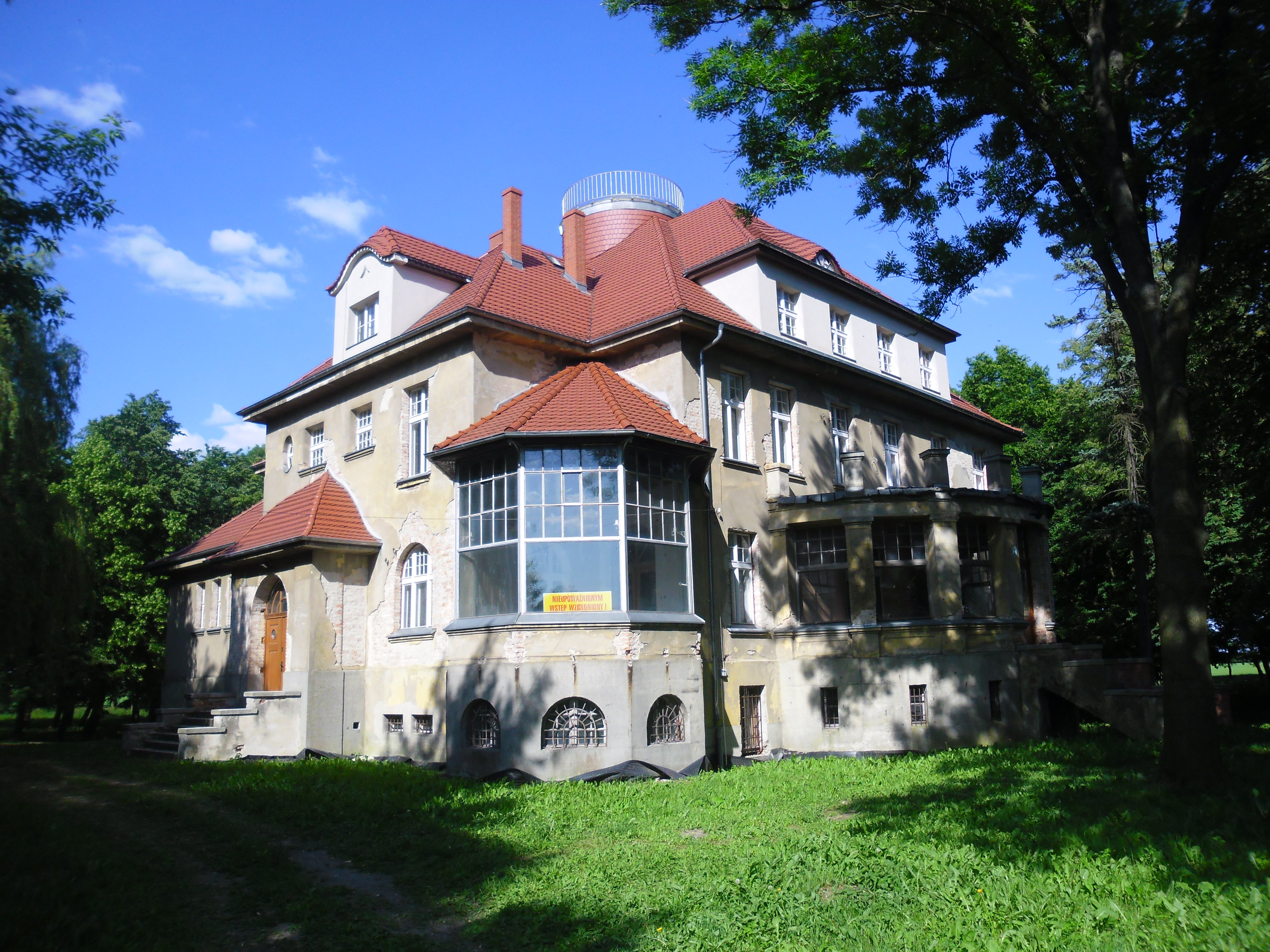
- Palace in from the south-west

- Location within Poland

General information
- Type: Palace
- Architectural style: Neo-Renaissance
- Location: Ostrowo Szlacheckie, Poland
- Coordinates: 52°21′39.66″N 17°36′21.47″E
- Construction started: 19th/20th century
- Completed: 1910

Ostrowo Szlacheckie Palace is a historic palace in Ostrowo Szlacheckie (Września County, Poland). Since 1977 national heritage site (Polish: zabytek).

== History ==
The palace was built in 1910. Palace park was included in the register in the nineteenth/twentieth century. The first owner was Friedrich Voge. After the death of the heir were Fridrich Voge Paul Voge, wife and children Elsa Ginter, Hilda, Margot. After World War II, the property was nationalized. Currently applying for palace granddaughter of Friedrich Voge.

== Gallery ==
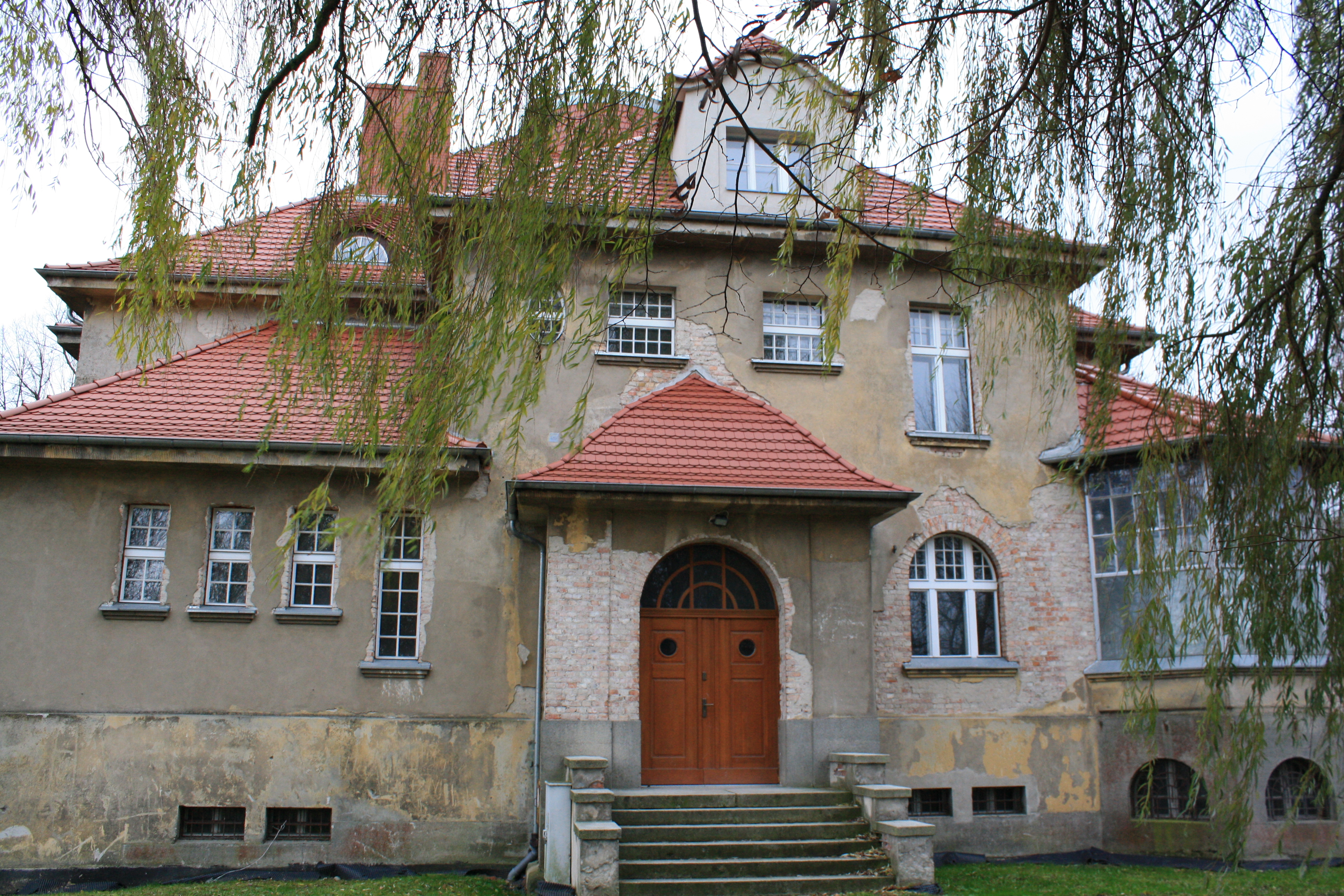
View of the palace from the west

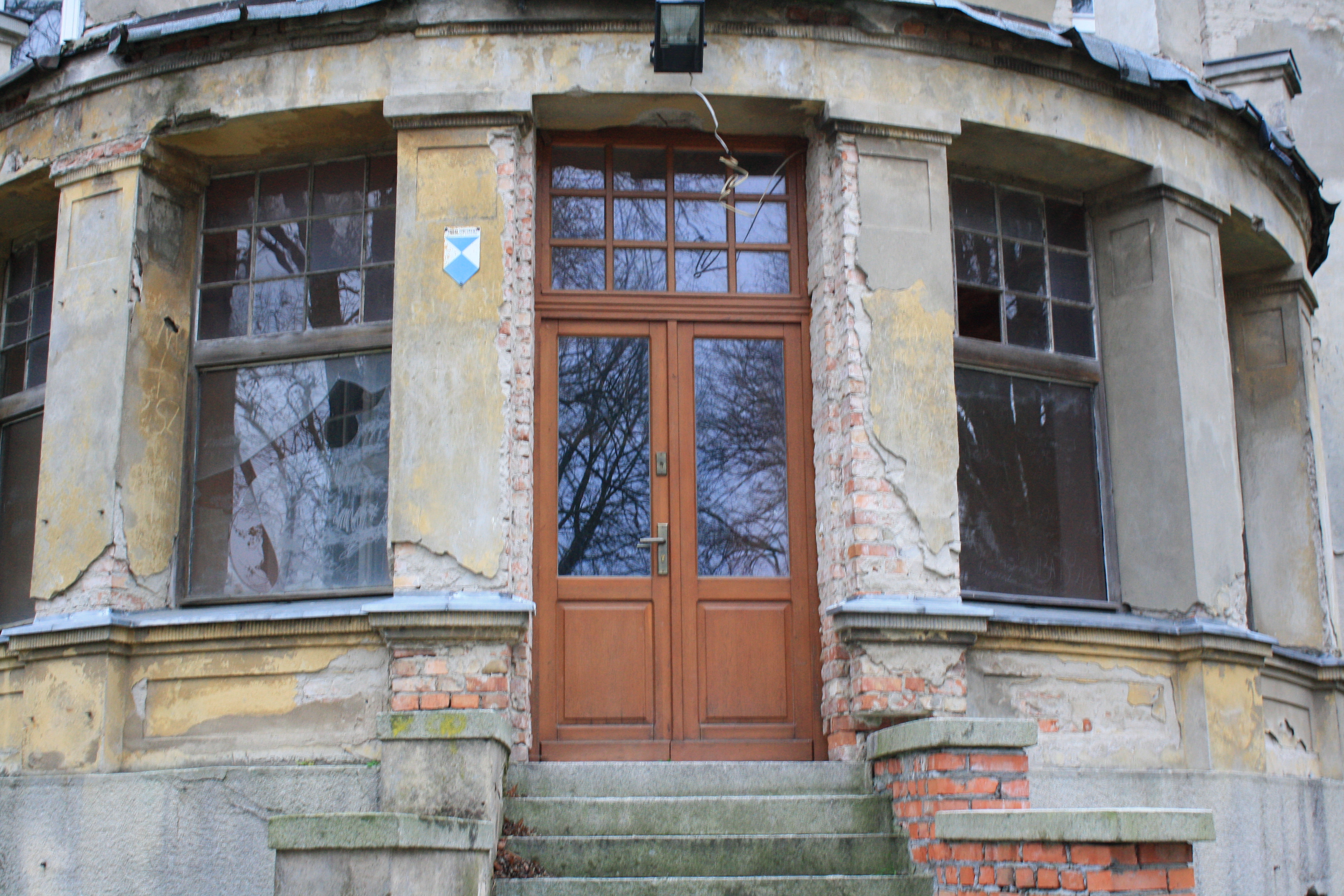
View of the front door of the palace

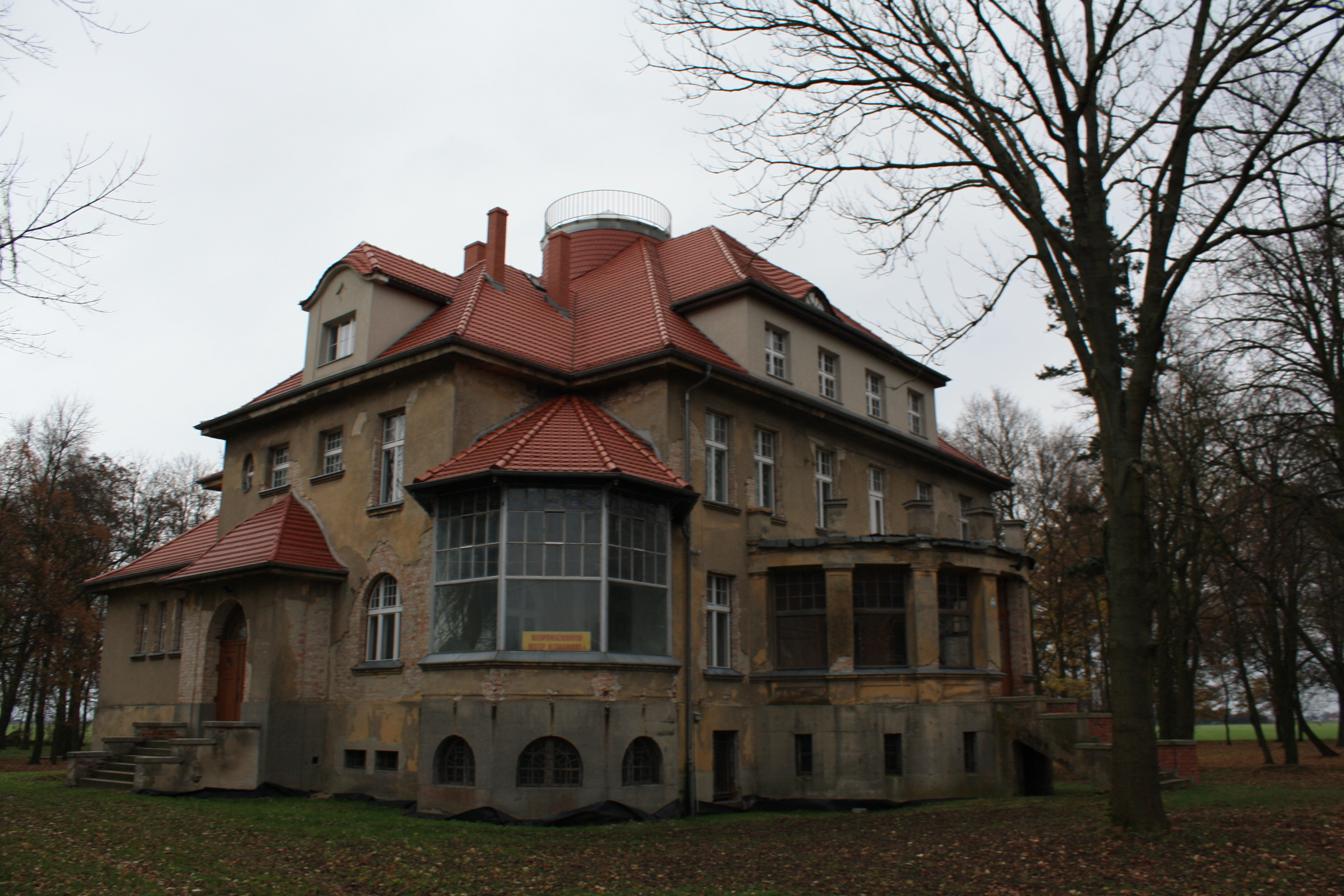
View of the palace

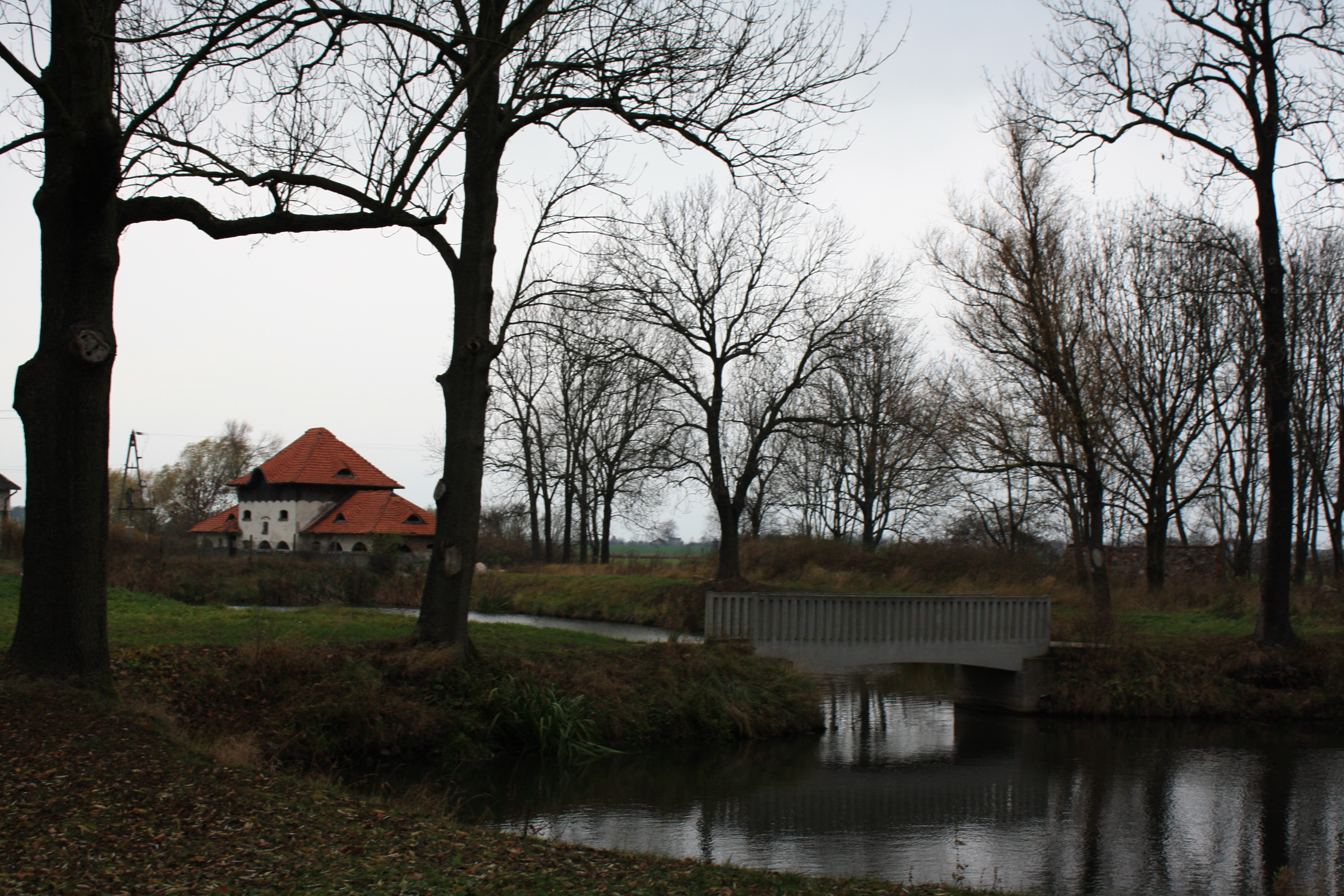
View of the palace bridge

== Sources ==
- Bartkowiak, Jan; Korzyniewski, Hilary (1988), Sokołowo: 40-lecie działalności (in Polish), Wojewódzki Ośrodek Postępu Rolniczego w Sielniku
