= Collection catalog =

Catalog of the collection of a museum or archive

In museums, the collection of cultural property or material is normally catalogued in a collection catalog (or collections catalog). Traditionally this was done using a card index, but nowadays it is normally implemented using a computerized database (known as a collection database) and may even be made available online.

== See also ==
- Library catalog, the corresponding term in library science
- Calendar (archives) and Finding aid, the corresponding terms in archival science
- Inventory (museum)
- Inventory (library and archival science)
