= City walls of Gdańsk =

14th-century fortifications in Poland

- Mury miejskie w Gdańsku
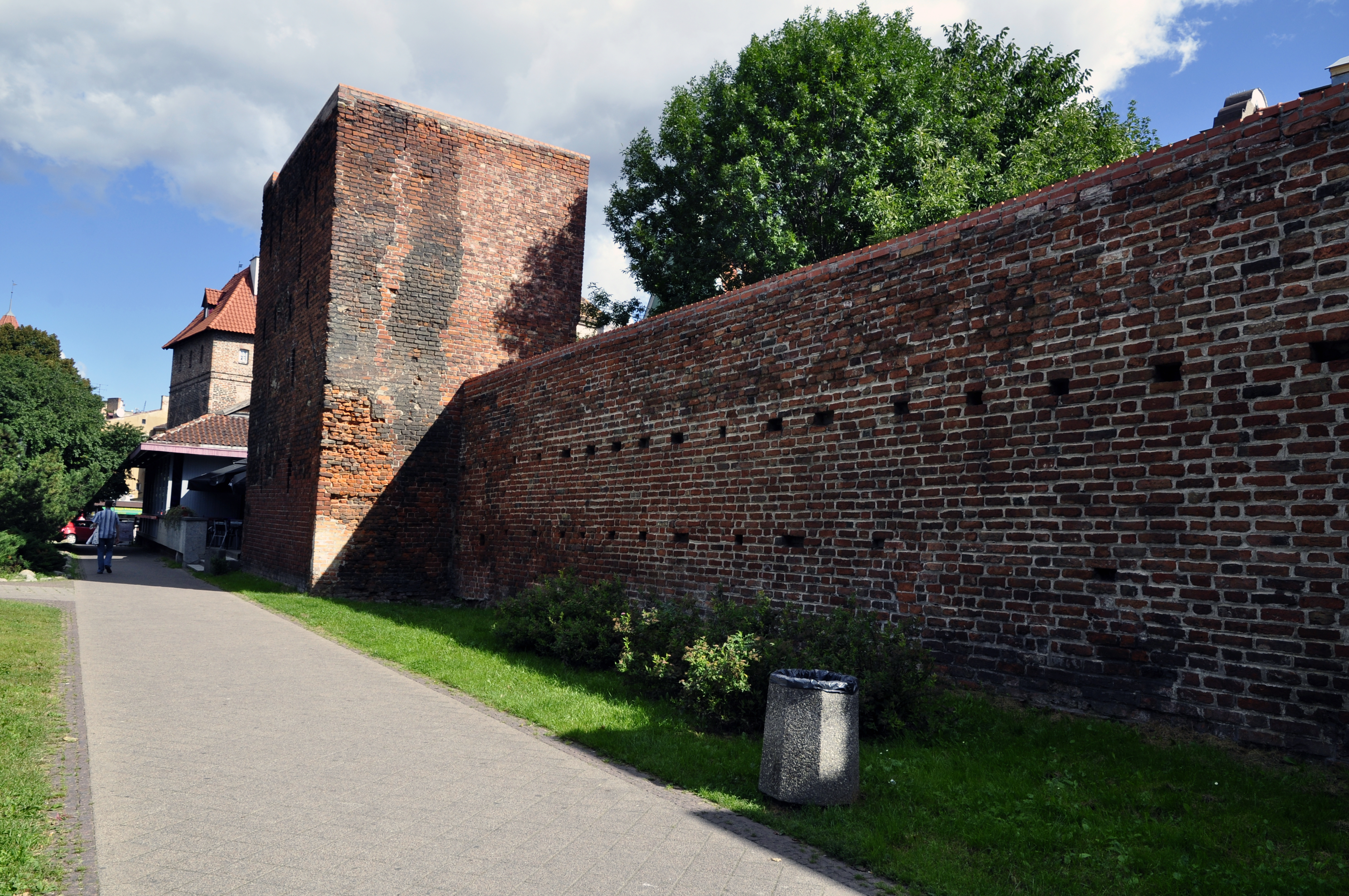

General information
- Type: Defensive wall
- Location: Gdańsk, Poland

Historic Monument of Poland
- Designated: 8 September 1994
- Part of: Gdańsk – city within the 17th-century fortifications
- Reference no.: M.P. 1994 nr 50 poz. 415

The Main City in Gdańsk is surrounded by a system of city walls dating back to the 14th century and rendered obsolete by the 16th and 17th centuries; most of the old walls no longer exist today.

== History ==
Following the Teutonic takeover of Gdańsk in 1308, a long dispute ensued between the Kingdom of Poland and the State of the Teutonic Order regarding ownership of the city. In 1343, after the dispute was settled and Poland recognized Teutonic rule over Gdańsk, renamed to Danzig, the Main City was granted city rights and work began on fortifying the settlement.

By 1370, most of the fortifications were complete. In 1379, the city received permission from the Teutonic Order to dig a moat, followed by a second layer of walls in 1380. The fortifications became more robust in 1409 and 1410. Although most of the city gates were completed in the 14th century, they were expanded and renovated well into the 16th. Due to the development of artillery, the walls became obsolete and the area beyond them was built up in the late 16th century, though some parts survive to this day, heavily damaged. New 17th-century fortifications caused the 14th-century walls to lose all importance.

Despite repeated attempts at conservation by the Gdańsk Museum, the city walls are today in a state of severe disrepair.

== Archaeological and reconstruction efforts ==
In the 1950s, some areas of the walls were reconstructed, though not faithfully and unsuccessfully, with another unsuccessful attempt occurring in the 1970s. The walls of the Main City were officially put on the heritage register in 1959. Archaeological excavations were conducted on the former site of the walls in 2005 and 2006, further determining details about their size and shape and contributing to reconstruction efforts.

== Course and components ==
The first part of the walls to be completed was the Corner Tower (Polish: Baszta Narożna), located at the intersection of two of the faces of the fortifications. In the south, they continue down what is now Za Murami Street and later Ogarna Street, until their eventual arrival at the shore of the Motława. Going north (up the western side of the walls), they passed by the Torture Chamber, the Targ Węglowy, and then north up Latarniana Street, where they turned to the east. In the north, they go east down Podwale Staromiejskie Street, also meeting the Motława.

=== List of city gates ===
The following is an organized list of the city gates, starting in the southeastern corner:

Image	Name in English	Name in Polish	Notes
	Anchorers' Gate	Brama Kotwiczników	Destroyed during World War II, with only a fortified tower remaining
	Frog Gate	Brama Żabia	Taken apart in the early 19th century, ruins rediscovered in 1945
	Gate on the Excesses	Brama na Zbytkach	Progressively taken apart in the 18th and 19th centuries, with the rest being destroyed in 1945
	Cirque Gate	Brama Karowa	Covered up in 1563, taken apart in 1896
	Long Street Gate	Brama Długouliczna	Replaced by the Golden Gate in 1611
	Ludwig Gate	Brama Ludwisarska	Demolished in 1803
	Wide Gate	Brama Szeroka	Demolished in the mid-19th century, with only a fortified tower remaining
	Castle Gate	Brama Zamkowa	Demolished following a fire in 1880
	Tobias' Gate	Brama Tobiasza	Rebuilt in 1884 and destroyed in 1945
	Market Stall Gate	Brama Staganiarska	Exists to this day
	St. John Gate	Brama Świętojańska	Exists to this day
	Gdańsk Crane	Brama Żuraw	Exists to this day as a major tourist attraction
	Holy Spirit Gate	Brama św. Ducha	Exists to this day
	Bread Gate	Brama Chlebnicka	Exists to this day
	Cog Gate	Brama Kogi	Replaced by the Green Gate in 1564
	Cow Gate	Brama Krowia	Exists to this day
