= Ostrowo Szlacheckie =

- Village
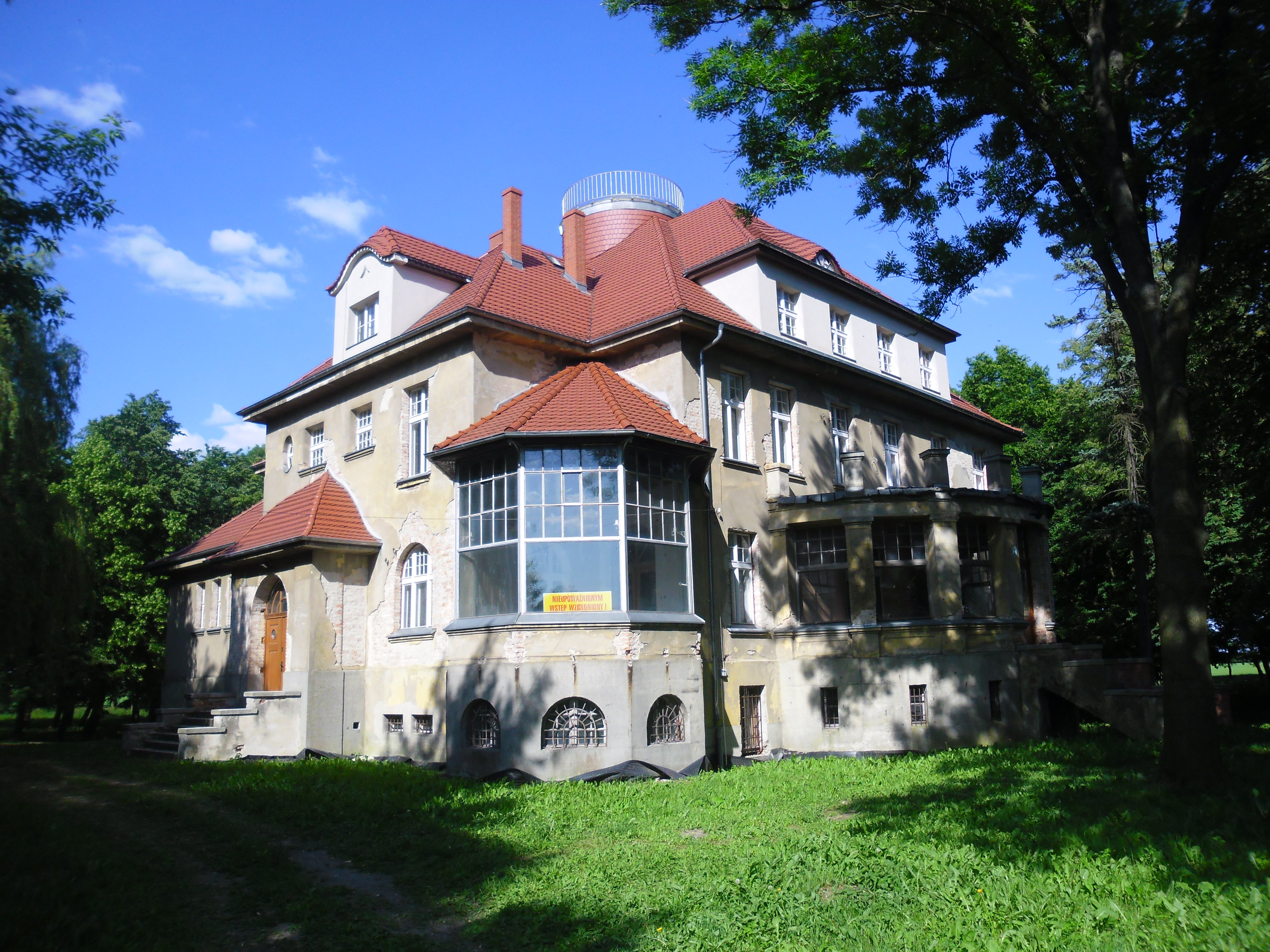
- Manor in the village

- Location within Poland
- Coordinates: 52°21′42″N 17°36′08″E
- Country: Poland
- Voivodeship: Greater Poland
- County: Września
- Gmina: Września

Ostrowo Szlacheckie [ɔsˈtrɔvɔ ʂlaˈxɛt͡skʲɛ] is a village in the administrative district of Gmina Września, within Września County, Greater Poland Voivodeship, in west-central Poland.

== Localities ==
- Ostrowo Szlacheckie Palace
