= Targ Węglowy =

Square in Gdańsk, Poland

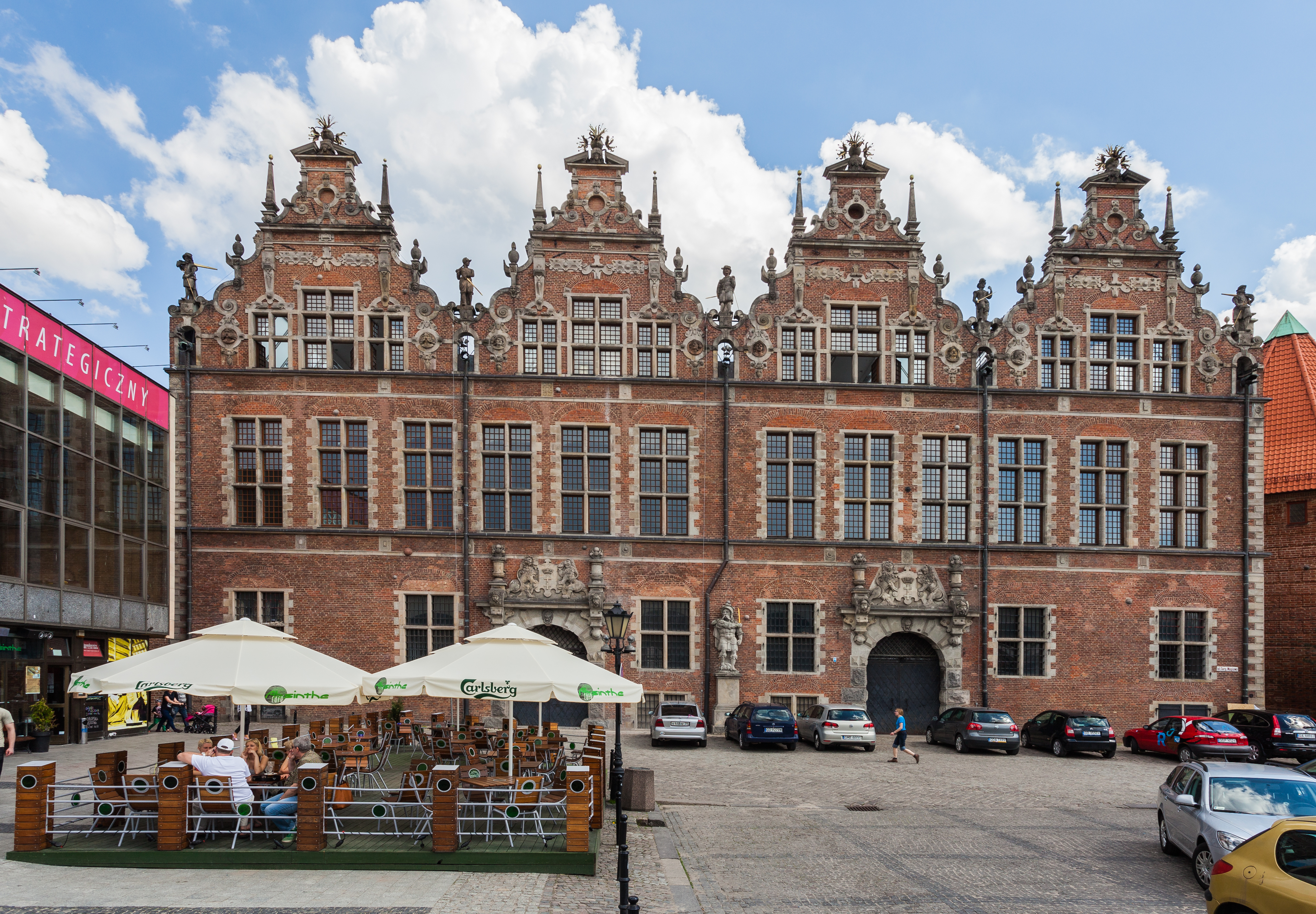
- The Great Armoury seen from Targ Węglowy
- Interactive map of Targ Węglowy
- Location: Główne Miasto, Śródmieście, Gdańsk

Targ Węglowy, translated into English as the Coal Market (German: Kohlenmarkt; Kashubian: Wãglowi Tôrg) is a public square located in central Gdańsk, located on the Royal Road.

== History ==
In 1342, the future site of the market, then a barren fallow, became part of the Main City of Gdańsk. After nearby moats and walls were demolished in the 17th century, the area became a proper urban square. Various market stalls were then put up there, making it known as the Ersbenmarkt (Pea Market). The area around it was developed from the 18th to the 20th centuries with contemporary and revivalist styles of architecture.

When the area came under Polish control in 1945, it was renamed the Targ Węglowy – the Coal Market, on account of charcoal being traded there during and after the 15th century.

=== Recent history ===
In 2013, as part of a broader push to pedestrianize parts of Gdańsk, thanks to the efforts of Gazeta Wyborcza in the action "Targ Węglowy must be for people" (Polish: Targ Węglowy musi być dla ludzi), the Targ Węglowy was closed to cars from 26 August to 4 September. On 13 January 2019, during a charity event on the Targ Węglowy, Gdańsk mayor Paweł Adamowicz was brutally stabbed by a mentally ill man on stage. A plaque commemorating the fatality was put up a year later, on the surface of the Targ Węglowy.

== Attractions ==
Notable buildings on and around the Targ Węglowy include the Torture Chamber, the Great Armoury, the Teatr Wybrzeże, and the LOT Building.
