= Witold Wnuk =

Polish cellist

Witold Wnuk (born 27 September 1957) is a Polish music impresario and cellist. As well as the cello, he plays the piano and drums. During his career he taught in the Middle-East, and has organised many competitions and festivals in his native Poland.

== Early life and education ==
Wnuk was born on 27 September 1957 in from Kraków. He was a graduate of State Music School in Kraków in the class of Krzysztof Okon and Academy of Music in Kraków in the cello class of Prof. Witold Herman (1982).

== Musical career ==
As a pianist, cellist and drummer in the 1970s and 80s he collaborated with, among others, Helena Modrzejewska National Old Theatre in Kraków, singer star Ewa Demarczyk and saxophonist Janusz Muniak.

=== In the Middle-East ===
In 1989–1995 he taught cello at the Higher Institute of Musical Arts in Kuwait. Co-founder (together with Cezary Owerkowicz) and director of a regular classical music season in Kuwait - Kuwait Chamber Philharmonia in the years 1992–2017.... He co-founded (with Cezary Owerkowicz) the local Chopin Piano competitions in Kuwait and Persian Gulf in the years 1996–2010. Director of Gulf Jazz Festival organised annually in Kuwait and occasionally in Bahrain, Qatar and Dubai since 1997.

=== Organiser in the musical community ===
In 1992–2013 he invited many renowned international and Polish classical and jazz music artists, among them Art Farmer, Ivo Pogorelić, Alphonse Mouzon, Krzysztof Penderecki, Konstanty A. Kulka, Janusz Olejniczak, Krzysztof Jabłoński, Waldemar Malicki, Vadim Brodski, Tamara Granat, Orkiestra NOSPR, Sinfonietta Cracovia, Opera Krakowska, Adam Makowicz, Michał Urbaniak, Urszula Dudziak, Tomasz Stańko, Ewa Bem, Zbigniew Namysłowski, Jarek Śmietana, Tomasz Szukalski, Janusz Muniak.

He was the founder of the biggest (taking into consideration the number of concerts (app.100) and performers (app.300) Polish jazz festival – Summer Jazz Festival Kraków, organised annually since 1996 (until 2017 called Letni Festiwal Jazzowy w Piwnicy pod Baranami), where he invites international jazz stars such as Herbie Hancock, Chick Corea, Pat Metheny, Bobby McFerrin, Al Jarreau, Branford Marsalis, Pharoah Sanders, Nigel Kennedy, John Scofield, Joe Lovano, Randy Brecker, Charles Lloyd, Maria Schneider. During the festival, since 2001, The Jazz Ram Award is being presented to distinguished Polish musicians with outstanding achievements.

He was the founder of My Polish Heart Foundation, founded together with the pianist Vladislav Sendecki - awarding annually prizes and scholarships, promoting talented young jazz musicians.

He was the founder and director of the Jarek Smietana International Jazz Guitar Competition in Kraków, organised bi-annually since 2015. The jury comprised musicians such as John Abercrombie, Mike Stern, Ed Cherry, Marek Napiórkowski, Karol Ferfecki.

He is the director of Cracovia Music Agency – a company organising concerts and festivals in Poland and overseas as well concerts of classical, jazz and pop music where his closest associates are Antoni Dębski and Aleksandra Marzec

== Awards and recognition ==
Witold Wnuk has been awarded the medals of Polish Ministry of Culture and National Heritage: "Medal for Merit to Culture" (1999) as well as bronze "Gloria Artis" (2011). In 2000 he became a laureate of "Silver Helicon Star" – an award of the Kraków jazz community, and in 2015 he was awarded Piwnica Golden Fleece Medal by the Piwnica pod Baranami Cabaret.

He holds several social functions, among them vice-chairman of the Kraków branch of Podhalanie (Highlanders) Association(od 2018)

== Family ==
Witold Wnuk is the great great grandson of Jan Krzeptowski Sabała, son of the writer Włodzimierz Wnuk and writer Irena Ostrowska-Wnukowa and brother of Joanna Wnuk-Nazarowa, Polish Minister of Culture in the years 1997-1999 and director of the National Polish Radio Symphony Orchestra (2000–2018).

Married since 1978, he has two daughters and three granddaughters.
