= Jacek Żuławski =

Polish sculptor

- Born: 29 March 1907; Kraków, Poland
- Died: 27 November 1976 (aged 69); Warsaw, Poland
- Occupation: Sculptor

Jacek Żuławski (29 March 1907 – 27 November 1976) was a Polish sculptor. His work was part of the sculpture event in the art competition at the 1948 Summer Olympics.
