= Inventory (museums) =

List of museum accessions and loans

An inventory is an itemized list of objects that a museum has accessioned or received via loan(s) and must be physically located by an examiner. A complete, one-hundred percent inventory, or a random inventory of the collection should be carried out periodically to ensure the museum is operating under best practices and for security purposes. The museum is legally responsible and ethically obligated for the maintenance of up-to-date information detailing the location of all objects within the collection, including loaned items and objects that have yet to be accessioned; this is stipulated by many museum associations, including the American Association of Museums.

== History of Practices (U.S.) ==
The American Association of Museums published its "Code of Ethics for Museum Workers" in 1925 which presaged the creation of training courses for the appropriate management of museum collections. The first rules for the registration of museum objects was published in 1958, the work of Dorothy H. Dudley, of the Museum of Modern Art in New York and Irma Bezold, of the Metropolitan Museum.

== Necessity ==
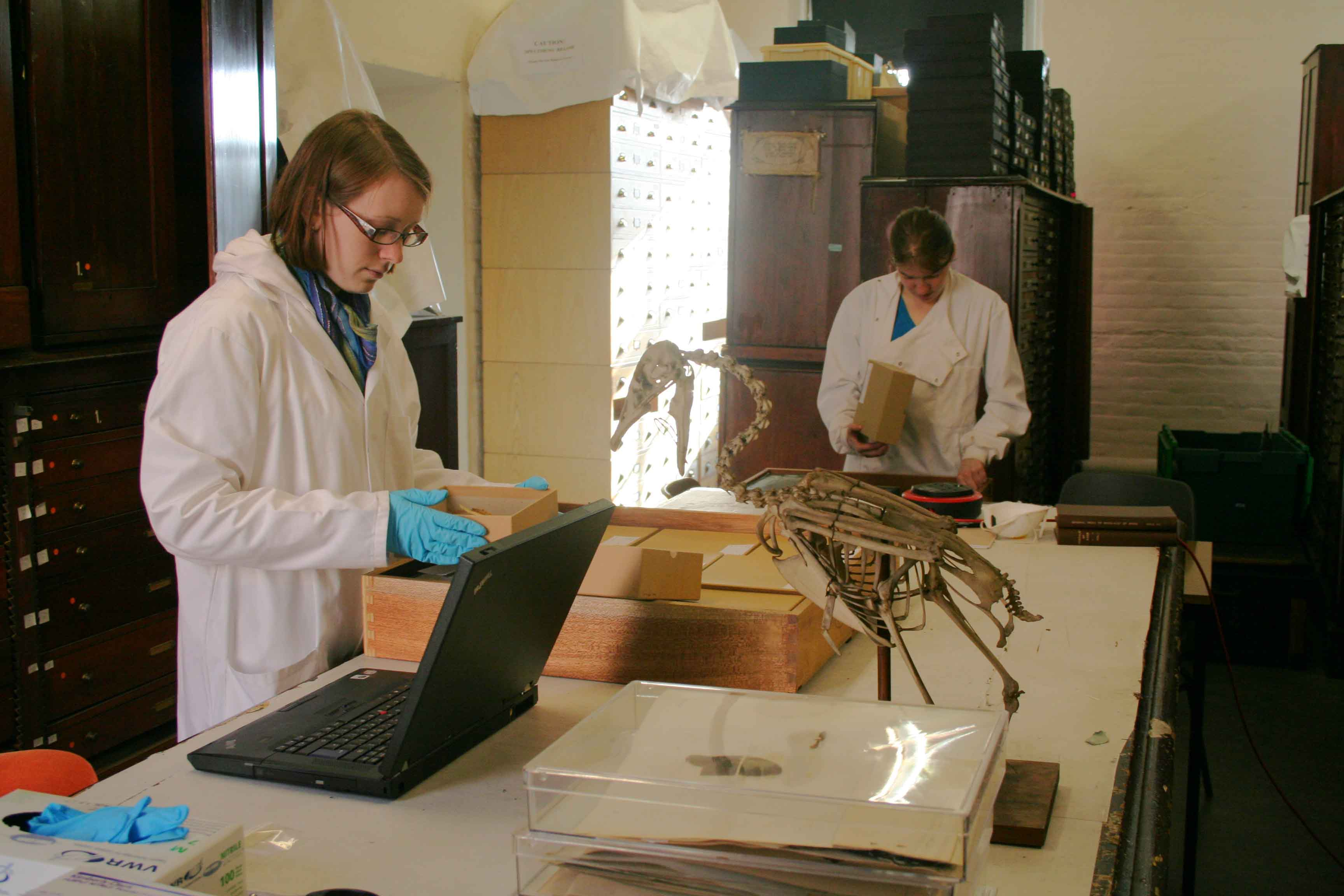
Inventory Project in the National Museum of Ireland – Natural History in 2009

The upkeep of the collections' inventory record is needed for minimum collections accountability. Inventories provide the collections manager and or the registrar with information for insurance purposes, security, and alerts staff to possible conservation or preservation needs of the collection.

=== Security ===
The completion and upkeep of and an inventory system helps to deter and aid in the early detection of theft of the collection. The International Council of Museums (ICOM) urges museums to complete and maintain their inventory systems because "If a museum does not know what is in its collection, where the works are located, and the condition they are in, it, in effect, invites theft because it will have no immediate sense that an object has disappeared, and most important, it will have no descriptive information to aid the recovery of an object in the event of a theft."
The type of inventory system used by a museum will be dictated by the Collections Management Policy (CMP). The CMP will determine how often items, what items, and how many items are to be inventory. Museums need to periodically complete a one-hundred percent inventory of their collection, but for the period in between the completion of such an inventory, a random sampling of the collection is sufficient. A random sampling of the collection serves as an indicator for the rest of the collection. If all the items are accounted for in a random sampling, then it can be assumed that rest of the collections' records is just as reliable. However, a complete inventory provides the institution with the knowledge that the entire collection can be accounted for; the random sampling is used to check the consistency of the collections' records.

An ongoing inventory method is a system that inventories on a regular basis high value items or items that are more susceptible to theft. This method resembles an iceberg, with the high value items being at the top of the iceberg. As the inventory method progresses further down the iceberg, items of lesser value can be found. Items found toward the center of the iceberg, need to be inventoried less than those found higher up on the berg, and more than items found below its position. Items at the lowest position of the iceberg, below the water's surface, may only need to be inventoried annually. With this type of inventory system, the most important or most valued objects are accounted for on a regular basis.

=== Review ===
Inventories serve several purposes, including the opportunity for review of the collections department. Such review includes:

- are all objects accounted for and found to be stored properly?
- is there any preservation or conservation issues that need to be brought to the attention of the registrar, collections manager, or curator?
- is the collections' location records reliable?

An inventory provides a systematic review of the collections department's records and helps to identify any problems. How smoothly an inventory goes is actually a reflection upon the institution. If an inventory is completed with little or no issues, then the collections department is running well; however, if many issues arise during the inventory process, this may be indicative of a collections department in need of review and change.

== Policy ==
Every museum must complete an inventory on a regular basis and this requirement should be stated in the museum's CMP. The CMP should also outline the steps that need to be carried out in the inventory process, including:

- an examination of each object and its records
- the condition of every object should be noted
- any updates to records shall be made
- and the inventory list will be filed in the museum's accession file

== Planning and scheduling ==
Sufficient time spent in planning must be devoted before beginning such a task as an inventory. A well thought out inventory procedure will efficiently utilize staff and their time. Such procedure should include:

1. The scope and purpose of the inventory.
2. Sources of funding for staff and equipment with a commitment from management for adequate time and resources to complete the inventory.
3. Resources required to complete the inventory (e.g. staff hours, computers, making and labelling equipment, imaging equipment, etc.)
4. Establish a timetable for the start and completion of the inventory.
5. Ascertain who will run and or carry out the inventory.
6. Identify the method of approach to completing the inventory, including standards used to record findings.
7. How to catalogue and manage information produced by the inventory and how that information will be reviewed and interpreted.

== Conducting an inventory ==
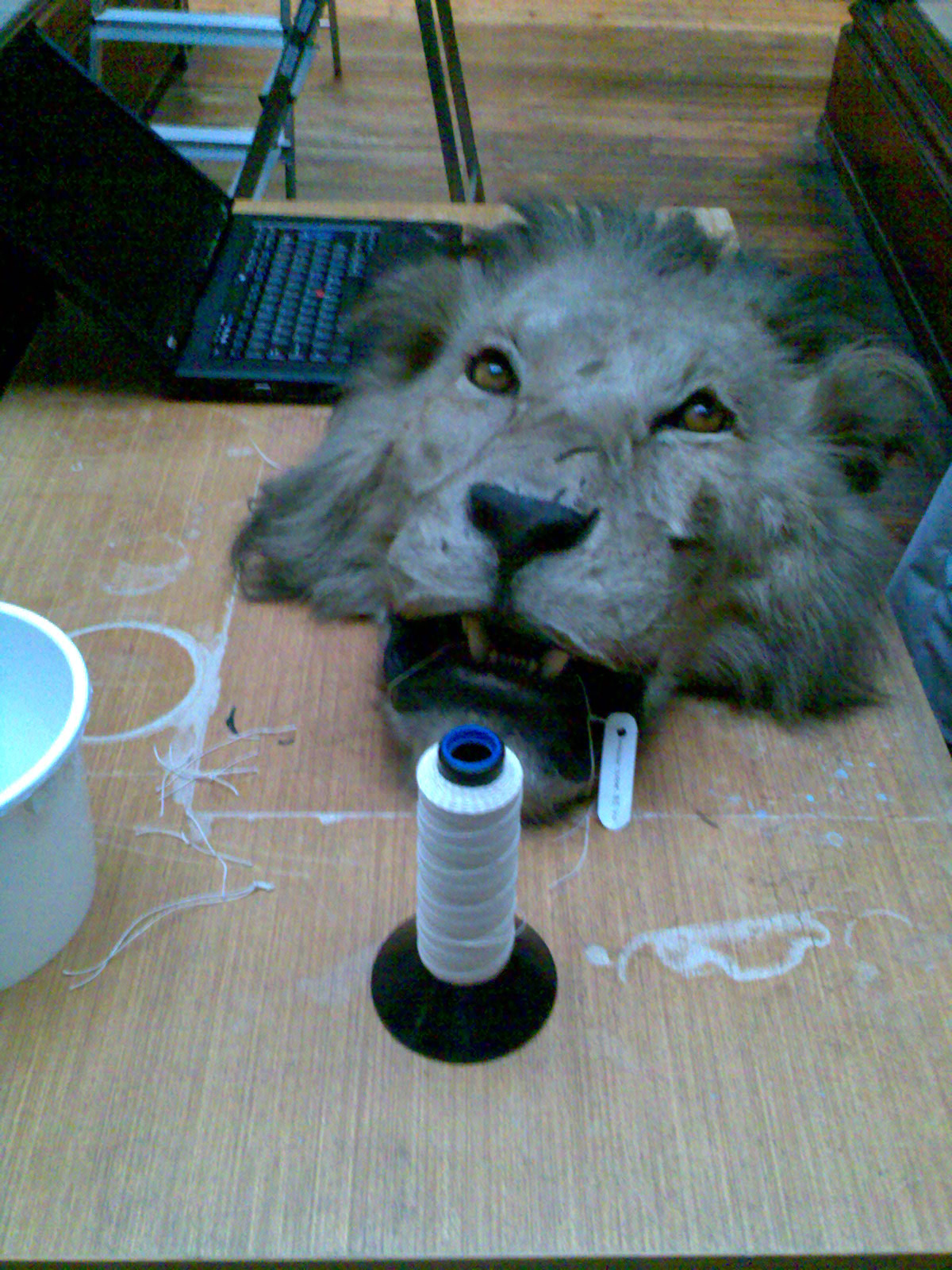
A taxidermied lion's head displayed in the National Museum of Ireland – Natural History, being labelled as part of a museum inventory

Now that inventory policy and procedure have been established, it is time to carry out the inventory. Conducting an inventory is the final step to the inventory process; it is relatively simple in that the actions are repetitive, but it can be one of the most time-consuming parts of the inventory process, depending upon the size of the collection and the intended scope of the inventory.

Select a method of approach when beginning the inventory process. How will the collection be inventoried? Shelf by shelf; or in numerical order of the catalogue? Once the inventory method is decided, a uniformed and basic inventory record for each object needs to be created. Such a record might contain the following:

1. Object Number
2. Object Name
3. Brief Description of Object
4. Condition (provides opportunity to conduct a condition check of the object)
5. Current Location
6. Notes (any other details not included in checklist, such as alerting the need for conservation treatment)
7. Recorder and Date
