= Marian Wnuk =

Polish sculptor

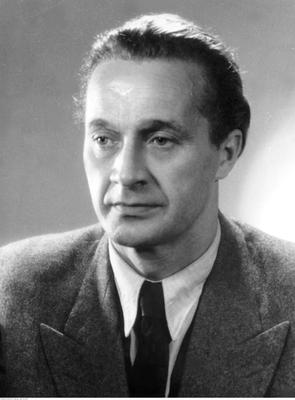
- Marian Wnuk in 1939
- Born: 5 September 1906; Przedbórz, Poland
- Died: 29 September 1967 (aged 61); Warsaw, Poland
- Occupation: Sculptor

Marian Wnuk (5 September 1906 – 29 September 1967) was a Polish sculptor. His work was part of the sculpture event in the art competition at the 1936 Summer Olympics.
