= Cultural property protection in Poland =

Category of laws in Poland

Logo to mark a zabytek, based on the Hague Convention of 1954

Cultural property protection (Polish: ochrona zabytków) in Poland is defined by law.

== Cultural property in Poland ==
According to Polish law, a cultural property item (Polish: zabytek; its plural form, Polish: zabytki, means cultural property) (Note: The plural zabytki may mean both cultural property understood as tangible cultural heritage (when used without specification) or cultural property items (when referring to a specified set)) is defined as an "immovable or a movable item, their parts or complexes, which are human creations or their byproducts, serving as a testimony of a past epoch or event, and whose preservation is in the societal interest due to their historical, artistic or scientific value."

The designation has sometimes also colloquially been used by humanities and arts scholars in a meaning incompatible with the legal definition, extended to cover also selected intangible cultural heritage item types, in particular language, works of literature and music compositions (other than historical manuscripts, pieces of rare or historical editions, or historical documents, considered cultural property items), but its usage in such meaning has mainly been confined to professional jargon in humanities and the arts, while not being prevalent in everyday language.

The increase in public awareness in Poland of cultural heritage after the damage done during World War II, was largely the work of Jan Zachwatowicz, the Polish signatory of the Venice Charter.

=== Classification by type ===
The cultural property is officially classified into three categories: movable cultural property, immovable cultural property, archaeological cultural property.

==== Immovable cultural property ====
Immovable cultural property are categorized as type A items and include the following:

- buildings or other individual constructions such as public art or memorials that have significant cultural value.
- Group of buildings that constitutes a coherent unit, regardless of individual value, such as a cultural landscape or cityscape.
- Park of cultural importance, including natural monuments such as valuable trees, group of trees (park, forest, lane, etc.) or a boulder.

==== Movable cultural property ====
Movable cultural property, such as works of art or technology, as well as library or archival items, are catalogued as type B items; however, the Registry does not include movable items included in a museum inventory, in the national library collections or the national archival fonds.

==== Archaeological cultural property ====
Archaeological sites and artifacts are catalogued as type C items; however, the Registry does not include artifacts included in a museum inventory,.

=== Classification by form of recognition ===
Objects are recognized as cultural heritage protected by law in four ways:

- if an object is added to the Registry of Cultural Property (Rejestr zabytków)
- if the heritage assigned a special status of Historic Monument (Pomnik historii); see List of Historic Monuments (Poland) for a complete list
- if the object is classified as a cultural park (Park kulturowy)
- if a local government declares the object in need of protection

== Cultural property protection organs ==
The cultural property protection organs (Polish: organy ochrony zabytków) of the national administration include the 16 voivodeship offices for cultural property protection (Polish: wojewódzkie urzędy ochrony zabytków) headed by a voivodeship cultural property conservator (Polish: wojewódzki konserwator zabytków) acting on behalf of the voivode. In addition, selected units of territorial self-government: gminas, cities with county rights and counties have used an option to appoint a communal, municipal, city or county cultural property conservator (Polish: gminny, miejski lub powiatowy konserwator zabytków) (Note: The Act also foresees an option to appoint a cultural property preservator by an inter-municipal, inter-county, or cross-category municipal-county union, as well as by a metropolitan union), with some tasks of the voivodeship conservator usually delegated to such an official under an agreement with the respective voivode, while the heads of the maritime offices are the first-tier organs in matters concerning maritime cultural property. Other state bodies may also be designated a first-tier organ in specific, justified cases on an ad hoc basis. The cultural property data is processed at the national level by the National Institute of Cultural Heritage (Polish: Narodowy Instytut Dziedzictwa), the latter also operating the National List of Intangible Cultural Heritage on behalf of the minister responsible for national cultural heritage, while all the abovementioned institutions are overseen by the General Cultural Property Conservator (Polish: Generalny Konserwator Zabytków), an office fulfilling the tasks of the second-tier organ, held by a secretary or an undersecretary of state at the ministry responsible for national cultural heritage and acting on behalf of the minister.

== See also ==
- Culture of Poland
- National Heritage Site
- World Heritage Sites of Poland
- List of Historic Monuments (Poland)
