= Parchowski =

Parchowski may refer to the following places in Poland:

- Parchowski Bór
- Parchowski Młyn
