= Sylczno =

- Village
- Location within Poland
- Coordinates: 54°09′56″N 17°44′10″E
- Country: Poland
- Voivodeship: Pomeranian
- County: Bytów
- Gmina: Parchowo
- Population: 209

Sylczno ([ˈsɨlt͡ʂnɔ]) is a village in Gmina Parchowo, Bytów County, Pomeranian Voivodeship, in northern Poland.

From 1975 to 1998 the village was in Słupsk Voivodeship.

== Transport ==
Sylczno lies along the national road.
