= Nakla =

- Village
- Location within Poland
- Coordinates: 54°08′N 17°41′E
- Country: Poland
- Voivodeship: Pomeranian
- County: Bytów
- Gmina: Parchowo
- Population: 638

Nakla [ˈnakla] is a village in Gmina Parchowo, Bytów County, Pomeranian Voivodeship, in northern Poland.

From 1975 to 1998 the village was in Słupsk Voivodeship.

== Transport ==
Nakla lies along the national road.
