= Glinowo =

- Settlement
- Location within Poland
- Coordinates: 54°10′5″N 17°40′0″E
- Country: Poland
- Voivodeship: Pomeranian
- County: Bytów
- Gmina: Parchowo
- Population: 37

Glinowo [ɡliˈnɔvɔ] is a settlement in the administrative district of Gmina Parchowo, within Bytów County, Pomeranian Voivodeship, in northern Poland.

For details of the history of the region, see History of Pomerania.
