= Jeleńcz =

Jeleńcz may refer to the following places in Poland:

- Jeleńcz, Kuyavian-Pomeranian Voivodeship (north-central Poland)
- Jeleńcz, Pomeranian Voivodeship (north Poland)
