= Zielony Dwór, Bytów County =

Zielony Dwór
- Settlement
- Location within Poland
- Coordinates: 54°11′43″N 17°41′57″E
- Country: Poland
- Voivodeship: Pomeranian
- County: Bytów
- Gmina: Parchowo
- Population: 12

Zielony Dwór (Polish pronunciation: [ʑɛˈlɔnɨ ˈdvur]) is a settlement in the administrative district of Gmina Parchowo, within Bytów County, Pomeranian Voivodeship, in northern Poland.

For details of the history of the region, see History of Pomerania.
