= Soszyca railway station =

Railway station in Soszyca, Poland

Coordinates: 54°15′07″N 17°34′51″E

Soszyca

General information
- Location: Soszyca; Poland
- Owner: Polskie Koleje Państwowe S.A.

Construction
- Structure type: Building: Yes (no longer used); Depot: Never existed Water tower: Pulled down

History
- Former names: Neukrug until 1945
Location

Soszyca is a non-operational PKP railway station in Soszyca (Pomeranian Voivodeship), Poland.

== Lines crossing the station ==
Start station	End station	Line type
Lębork	Bytów	Closed
