= Nowa Wieś, Bytów County =

Nowa Wieś
- Village
- Location within Poland
- Coordinates: 54°17′20″N 17°41′05″E
- Country: Poland
- Voivodeship: Pomeranian
- County: Bytów
- Gmina: Parchowo
- Population: 86

Nowa Wieś [ˈnɔva ˈvjɛɕ] is a village in Gmina Parchowo, Bytów County, Pomeranian Voivodeship, in northern Poland.

From 1975 to 1998 the village was in Słupsk Voivodeship.
