= Chośnica =

- Village
- Location within Poland
- Coordinates: 54°16′03″N 17°40′09″E
- Country: Poland
- Voivodeship: Pomeranian
- County: Bytów
- Gmina: Parchowo
- Area: 2.32 km^{2} (0.90 sq mi)
- Population: 118

Chośnica [xɔɕˈnit͡sa] is a village in Gmina Parchowo, Bytów County, Pomeranian Voivodeship, in northern Poland.

From 1975 to 1998 the village was in Słupsk Voivodeship.
