= Jamnowski Młyn =

- Settlement
- Location within Poland
- Coordinates: 54°13′7″N 17°39′28″E
- Country: Poland
- Voivodeship: Pomeranian
- County: Bytów
- Gmina: Parchowo
- Population: 79

Jamnowski Młyn [jamˈnɔfski ˈmwɨn] is a settlement in the administrative district of Gmina Parchowo, within Bytów County, Pomeranian Voivodeship, in northern Poland.

For details of the history of the region, see History of Pomerania.
