= Gołczewo =

- Village
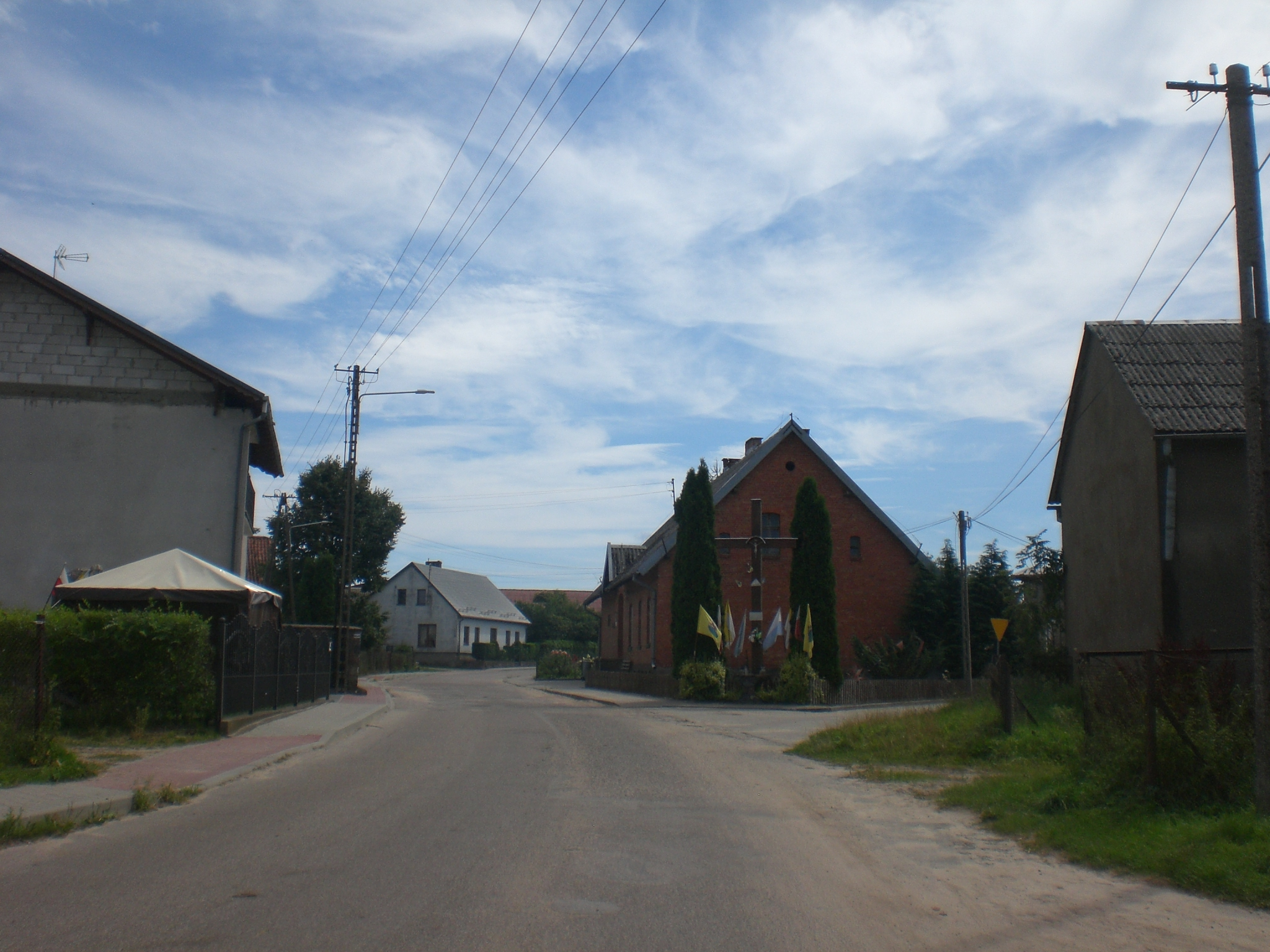

- Location within Poland
- Coordinates: 54°11′31″N 17°38′22″E
- Country: Poland
- Voivodeship: Pomeranian
- County: Bytów
- Gmina: Parchowo
- First mentioned: 1252

Area
  - Total: 8.34 km^{2} (3.22 sq mi)

Population
  - Total: 281
- Time zone: UTC+1 (CET)
  - Summer (DST): UTC+2 (CEST)
- Vehicle registration: GBY

Gołczewo [ɡɔu̯ˈt͡ʂɛvɔ] is a village in Gmina Parchowo, Bytów County, Pomeranian Voivodeship, in northern Poland.

== Etymology ==
The name of the village comes from the Old Polish male name Golec or Gołek.

== History ==
There was an early medieval stronghold near Gołczewo, now an archaeological site, where also Bronze Age objects were found. The village was first mentioned in documents in 1252.

From 1975 to 1998, the village was in Słupsk Voivodeship.
