= Grabowo Parchowskie =

- Village
- Location within Poland
- Coordinates: 54°11′33″N 17°43′30″E
- Country: Poland
- Voivodeship: Pomeranian
- County: Bytów
- Gmina: Parchowo
- Area: 6.13 km^{2} (2.37 sq mi)
- Population: 36

Grabowo Parchowskie [ɡraˈbɔvɔ parˈxɔfskʲɛ] is a village in Gmina Parchowo, Bytów County, Pomeranian Voivodeship, in northern Poland.

== History ==
From 1975 to 1998 the village was in Słupsk Voivodeship.

== Population ==
As per population census 2021, Grabowo Parchowskie has a population of 37, of which 21 are males and 16 females.
