= Bawernica =

- Village
- Location within Poland
- Coordinates: 54°17′6″N 17°41′47″E
- Country: Poland
- Voivodeship: Pomeranian
- County: Bytów
- Gmina: Parchowo
- Population: 81

Bawernica [bavɛrˈnit͡sa] is a village in the administrative district of Gmina Parchowo, within Bytów County, Pomeranian Voivodeship, in northern Poland.

For details of the history of the region, see History of Pomerania.
