= Neptune's Fountain, Gdańsk =

Historic site in Gdańsk, Poland

Coordinates: 54°20′55″N 18°39′12″E

Neptune's Fountain
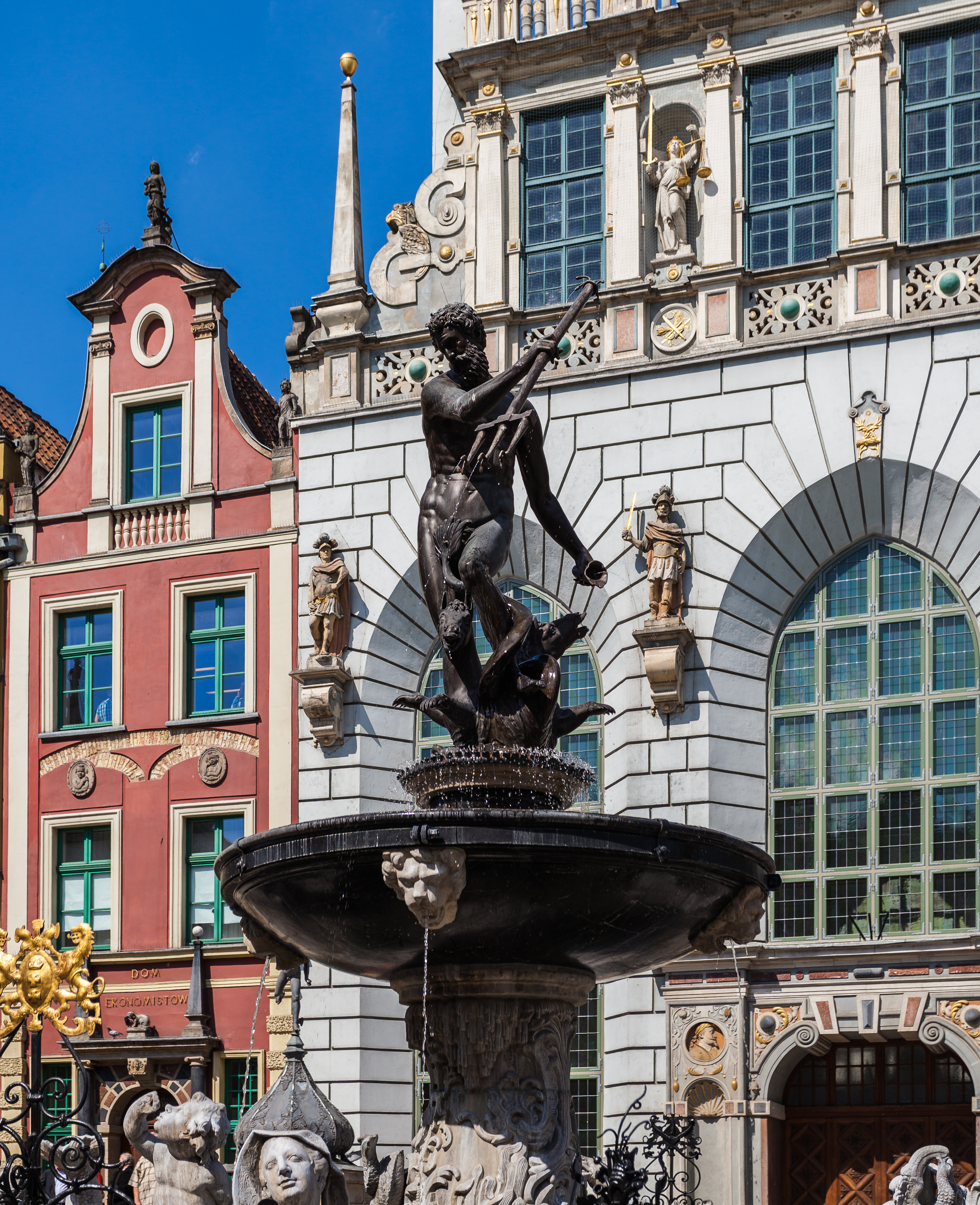
- Neptune's Fountain statue at the Długi Targ

General information
- Architectural style: Flemish Mannerism, Rococo
- Location: Gdańsk, Poland
- Construction started: 1606
- Completed: 1633

Historic Monument of Poland
- Designated: 1994-09-08
- Part of: Gdańsk – city within the 17th-century fortifications
- Reference no.: M.P. 1994 nr 50 poz. 415

Neptune's Fountain (Polish: Fontanna Neptuna; German: Neptunbrunnen) is a historic fountain in Gdańsk, a Mannerist-Rococo masterpiece, and one of the most distinctive landmarks of the city. The fountain is located at the Długi Targ (Long Market), in front of the entrance to the Artus Court. It was constructed in the early 17th century. Kashubians use the nickname Krësztof for the sculpture.

== History ==
In 1549 a now unknown well was located by the entrance of Artus Court, which may have had metal decorative pieces. The well was located slightly closer to the Motława.

The local authorities of Gdańsk, together with Mayor Bartholomäus Schachmann wanted to raise a more notable monument. The first mason to receive an offer to complete the project was Jakob Kordes from Lübeck, but for unknown reasons, his plan was not accepted. The new fountain was to be constructed at the centre of the facade of the Artus Court, from the Green Gate the fountain would be seen with the Main town hall in the background, with the turn to the Long Lane. Neptune - the god of the sea - was to be placed facing the townhouses, which were the residence of the Polish kings, while at their stay in Danzig, the mythological god was to have his head bow down to them. The fountain was to have underground pumps connecting the fountain to the Potok Siedlecki by Sienny Market; however, the pressure was too low.

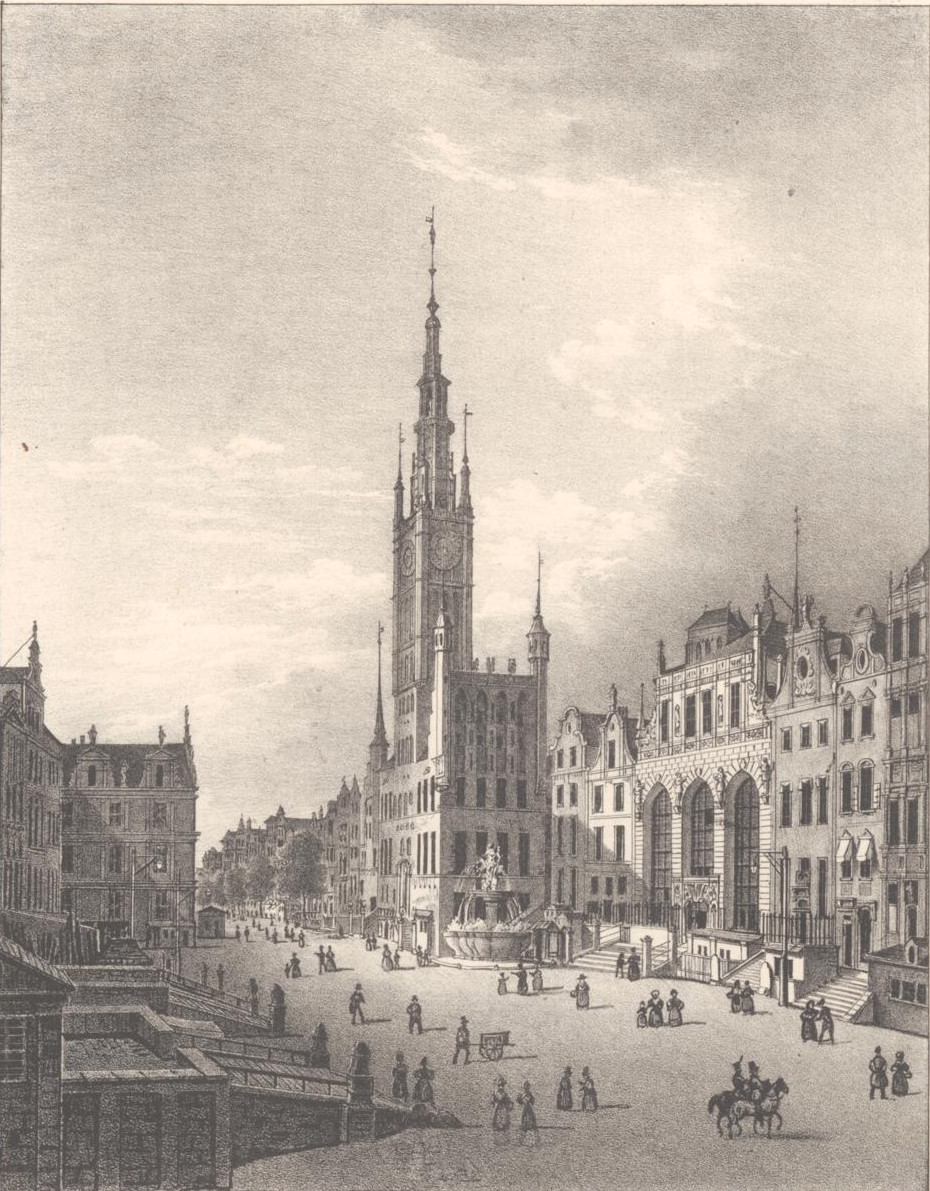
The Neptune's Fountain and its surroundings in 1838.

Between 1606 and 1615, there were pending projects, sculpturing, and casting. The sculpture's project was made by Abraham van den Blocke (1572–1628), with the statue made by Flemish Peter Husen. The sculpture was cast from bronze in 1615 in the town casting guild by Gerdt Benning. The mass of the figure is 650 kilograms. The stem the figure is found on, is made from black tuff. The architectural features of the fountain relate to Flemish Mannerism. The water installations were made by Ottomar von Wettner, with the water systems designed by Adam Wybe. The water tanks were located on the rooftop of the Main Town Hall and Artus Court. Until the second half of the nineteenth-century, when the underground water system was modernized, the fountain was only operational a few days of the year.

The fountain was previously painted. The fountain was opened on October 9, 1633, the delay was caused due to numerous disruptions: the renovation of the Artus Court; problems with the robustness of the water system; the Polish–Swedish war; and the death of Abraham van den Blocke. In 1634 the fountain was encompassed by a fence decorated with gilded Polish Eagles. The inauguration of the fountain's operation took place on March 23, 1634. Between the years of 1757 and 1761, Johann Karl Stender made new fragments of the fountain and stem, and meister blacksmith Jakob Barren had reconstructed and replaced the broken grate. This is when the fountain received its Rococo architectural style.

In 1927, the fountain was renovated. In the 1930s, Nazis removed the historic Polish Eagles from the fountain's fence as part of removing traces of the city's Polish history and heritage. The fountain was damaged during World War II, and moved to German-occupied Parchowo. After World War II the fountain was renovated between 1950 and 1954 and put back to operation on July 22, 1957. Historic Polish Eagles on the fence were restored. In 1988, as part of renovation works the fountain's genitals were covered with a fig leaf. A full renovation of the fountain occurred between September 2011 and April 2012.

== Gallery ==
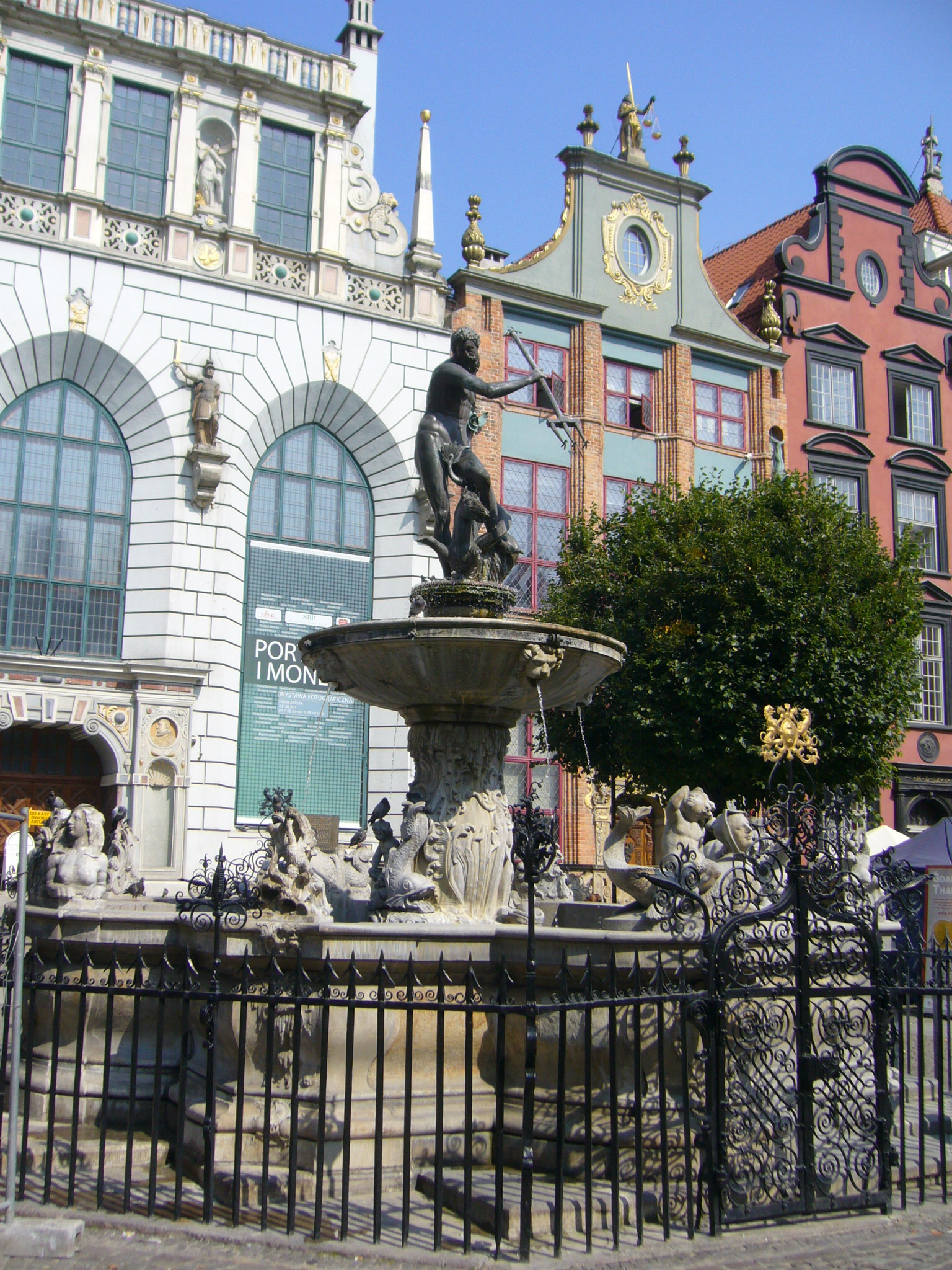
Neptune's Fountain in front of the Artus Court

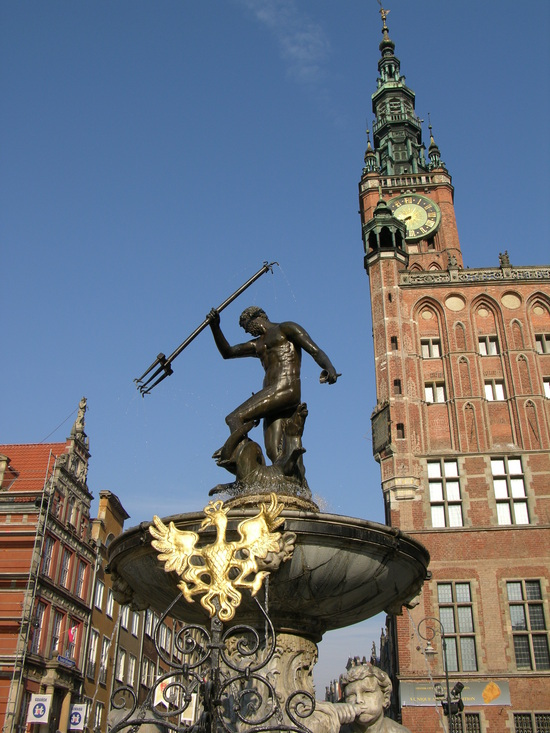
The fountain with the Polish Eagle in the foreground and the Main Town Hall in the background

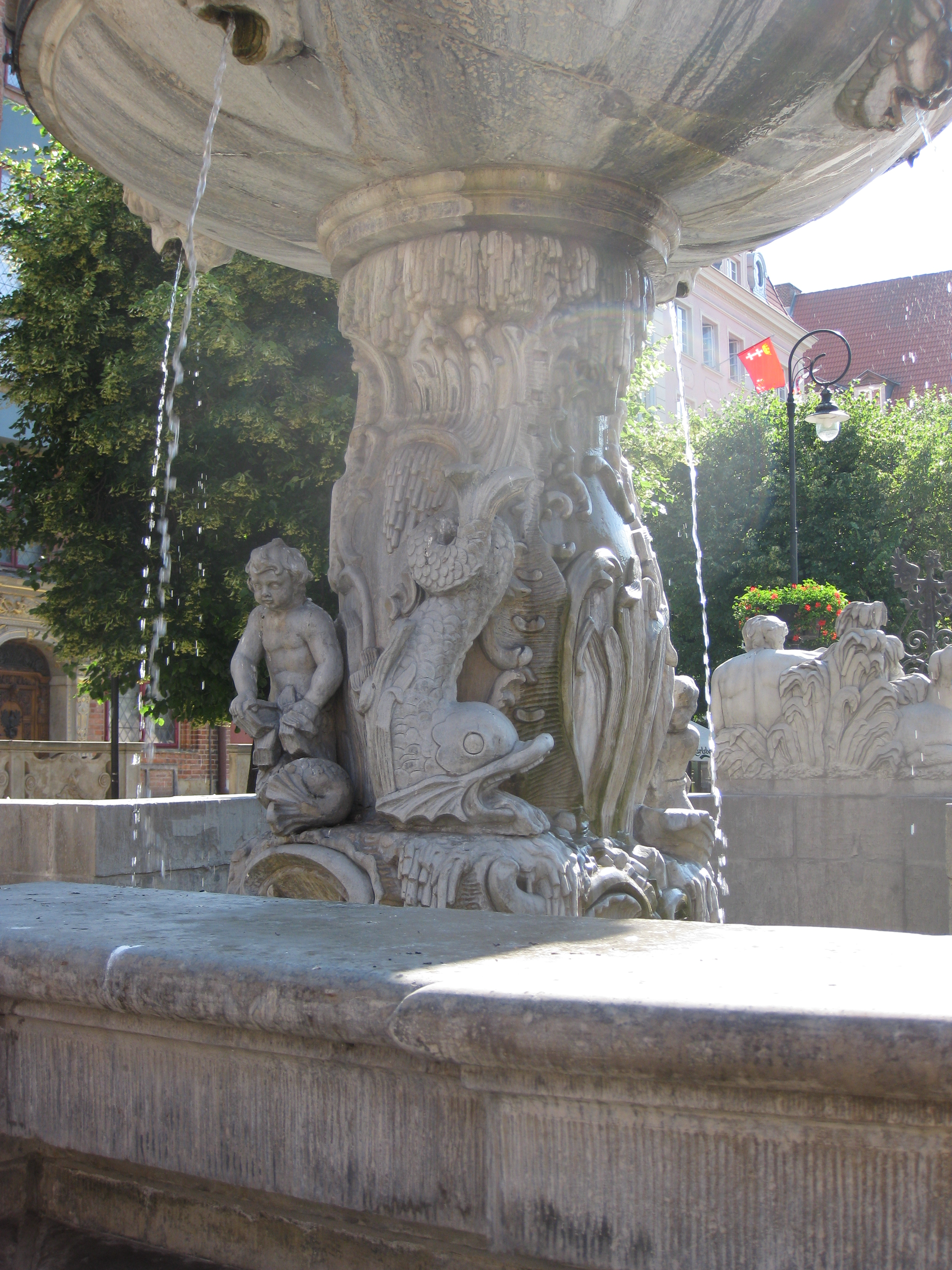
The base of the fountain

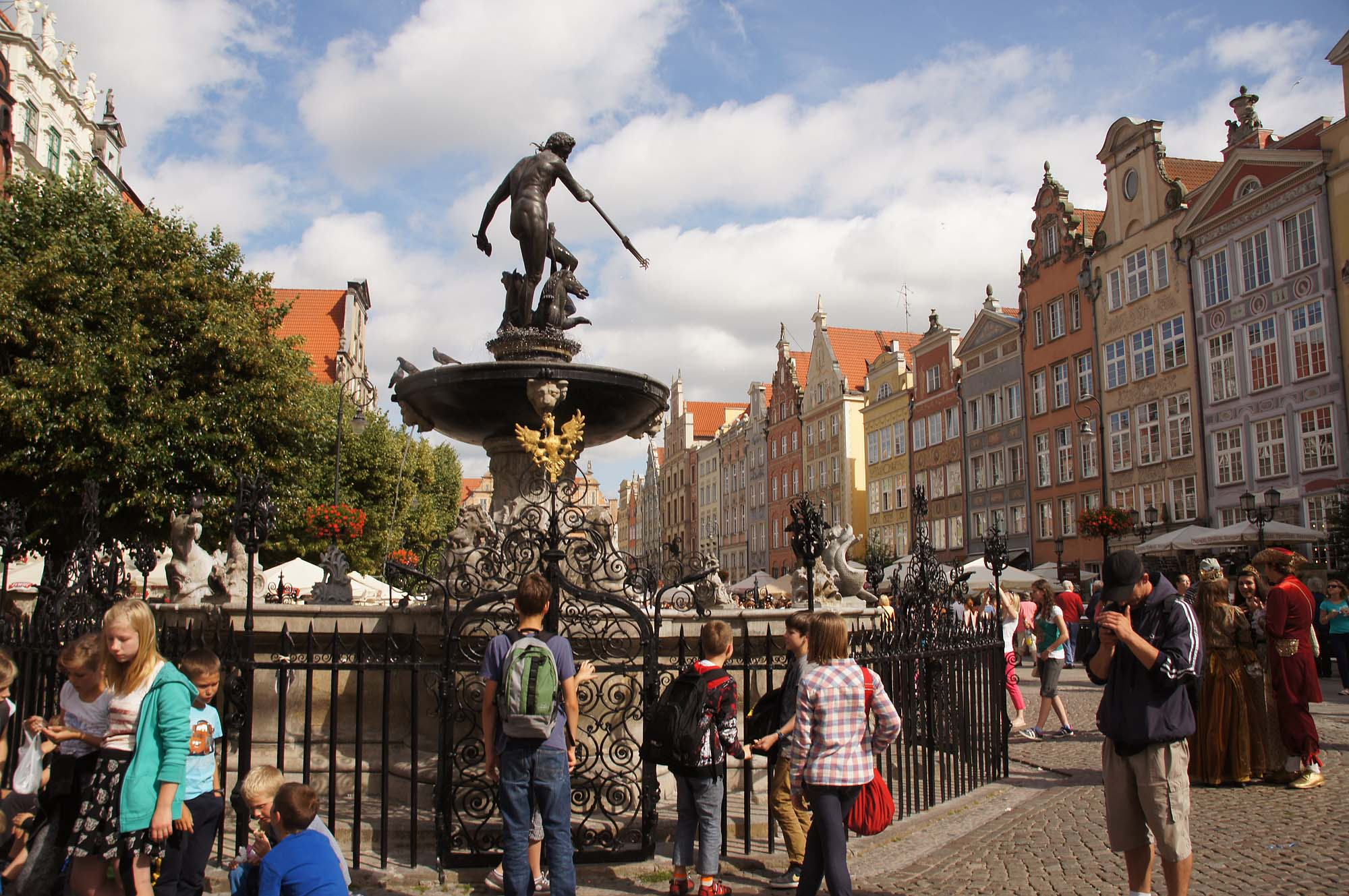
Neptune's Fountain and the historic townhouses of Gdańsk

== See also ==
- John III Sobieski Monument in Gdańsk
