= Jeleńcz, Pomeranian Voivodeship =

Jeleńcz
- Village
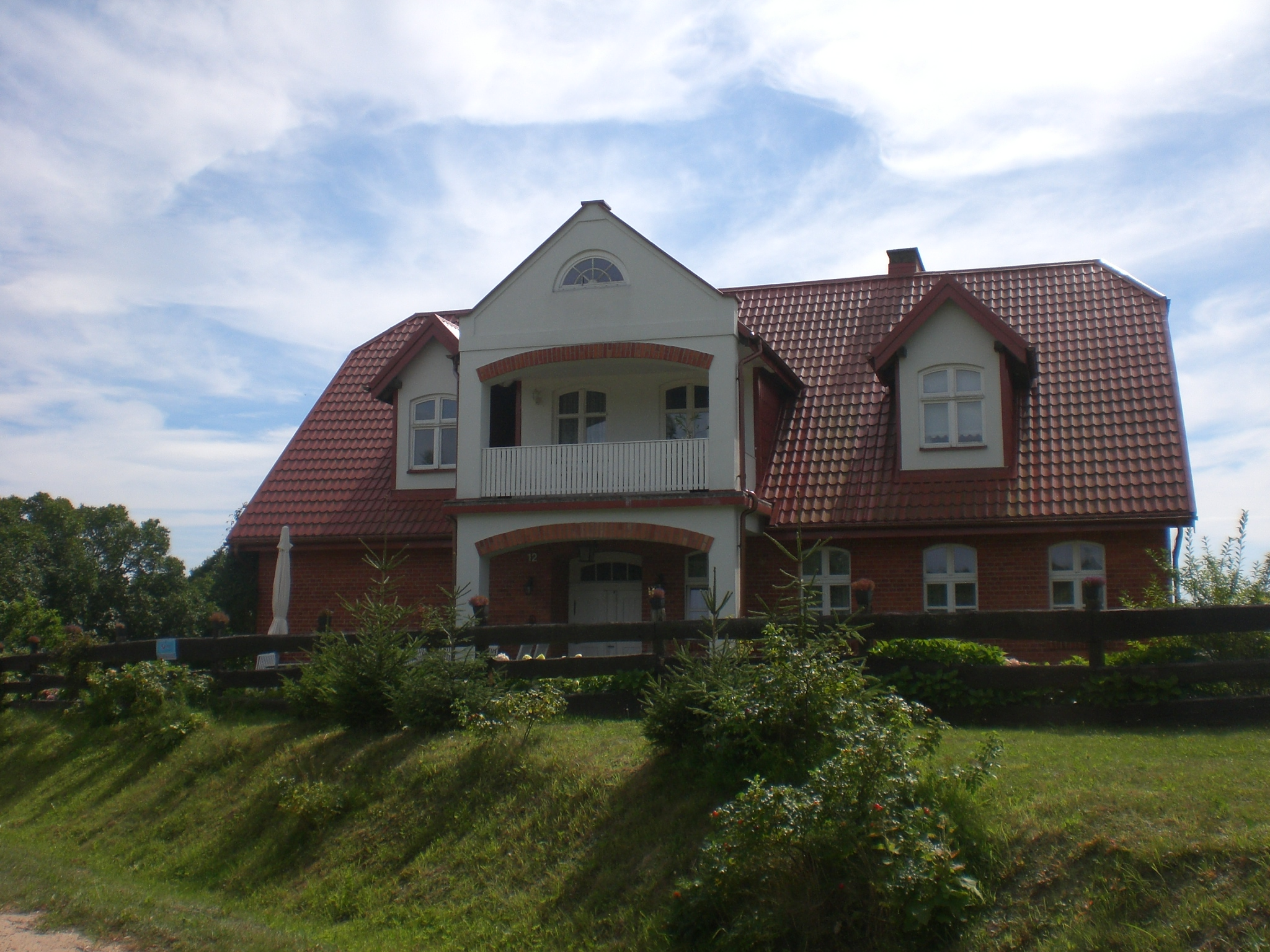

- Location within Poland
- Coordinates: 54°10′31″N 17°38′33″E
- Country: Poland
- Voivodeship: Pomeranian
- County: Bytów
- Gmina: Parchowo

Area
  - Total: 4.18 km^{2} (1.61 sq mi)

Population
  - Total: 111
- Time zone: UTC+1 (CET)
  - Summer (DST): UTC+2 (CEST)
- Vehicle registration: GBY

Jeleńcz [ˈjɛlɛɲt͡ʂ] is a village in Gmina Parchowo, Bytów County, Pomeranian Voivodeship, in northern Poland.

From 1975 to 1998 the village was in Słupsk Voivodeship.

== Etymology ==
The name of the village comes from the word jeleń, Polish for deer, meaning a forest where deer live.

== Sights ==
The main landmark is a timber framed Neoclassical manor house, built in the 18th century.
