= Parchowo =

- Village
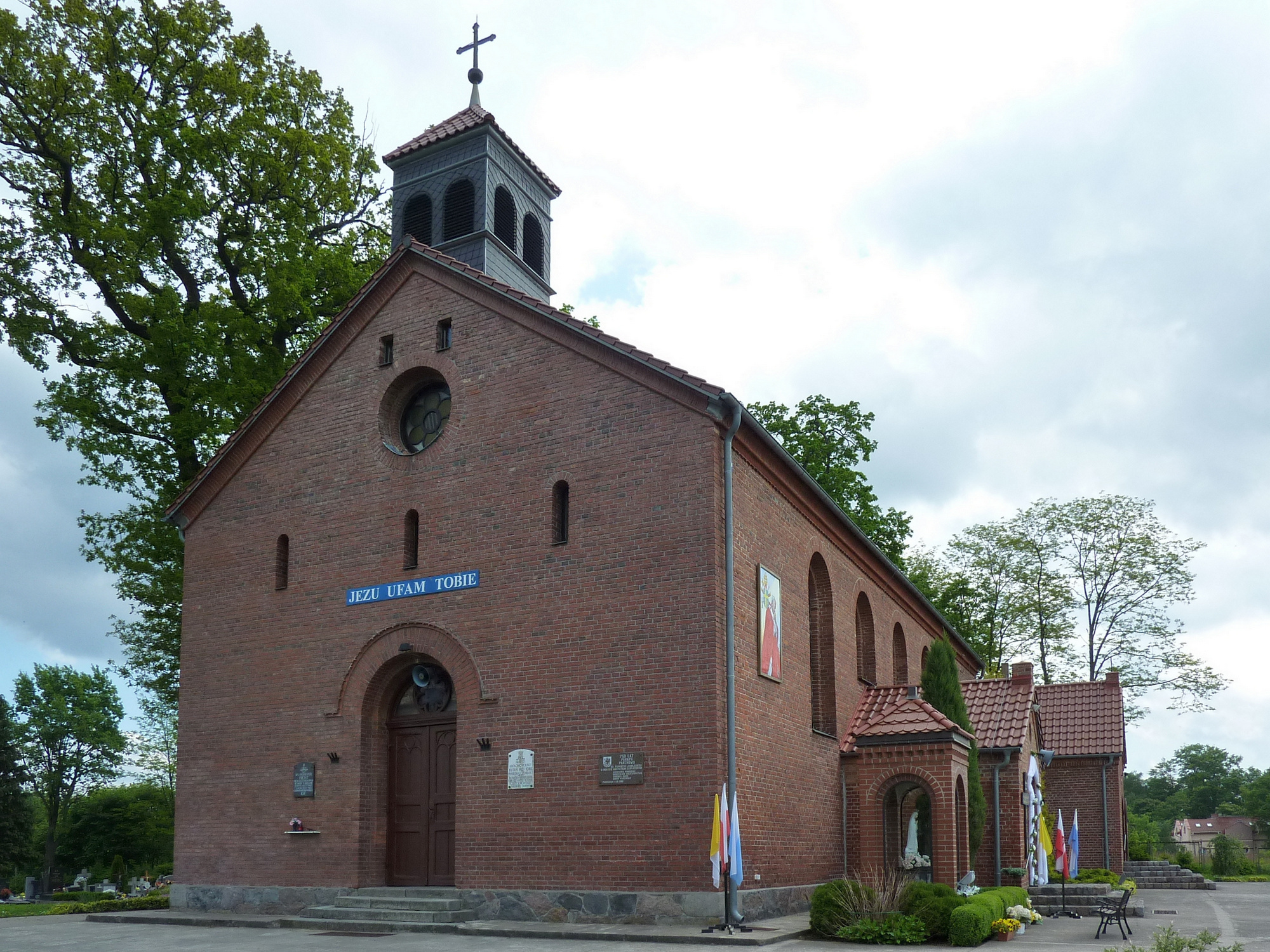
- Saint Nicholas church in Parchowo

- Coat of arms

- Location within Poland
- Coordinates: 54°12′23″N 17°40′05″E
- Country: Poland
- Voivodeship: Pomeranian
- County: Bytów
- Gmina: Parchowo
- First mentioned: 1253
- Population: 1,019
- Time zone: UTC+1 (CET)
  - Summer (DST): UTC+2 (CEST)

Parchowo [parˈxɔvɔ] is a village in Gmina Parchowo, Bytów County, Pomeranian Voivodeship, in northern Poland.

Parchowo is the seat of the Gmina Parchowo.

== History ==
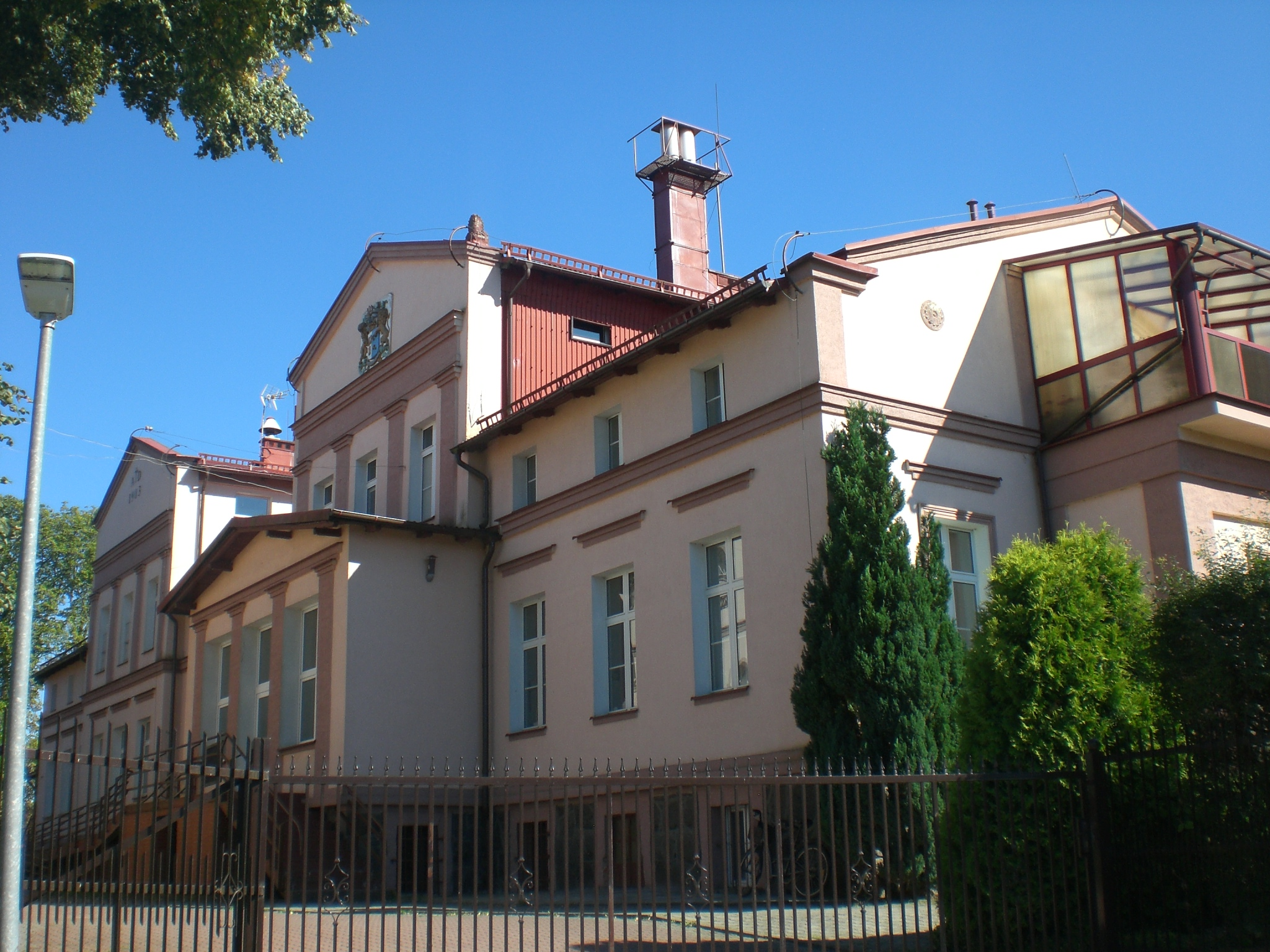
Nursing home in Parchowo

The oldest known mention of Parchowo comes a document of Wolimir, Bishop of Kuyavia from 1253. Parchowo was the seat of local royal starosts from 1663 until the First Partition of Poland in 1772, when it was annexed by Kingdom of Prussia. The village was subject to Germanisation policies and many Kashubian families from Parchowo emigrated to America (see Kashubian diaspora).

After Poland regained independence after World War I in 1918, the village was restored to Poland. During the German occupation (World War II), in September 1939, the Einsatzkommando 16 murdered the local Polish priest Sylwester Frost as part of a massacre of Polish priests in the forest near Kartuzy (see Nazi crimes against the Polish nation). Also during the occupation, the historic Neptune's Fountain from Gdańsk was hidden in the village. After the war the village was restored to Poland.

From 1975 to 1998 the village was located in the Słupsk Voivodeship.

== Transport ==
Parchowo lies along the voivodeship road.

== Notable people ==
- Wiktor Żywicki (1893–1981), Polish soldier, recipient of the Silver Cross of the Virtuti Militari
- Natalia Szroeder (born 1995), Polish singer
