= Parchowski Młyn =

- Village
- Location within Poland
- Coordinates: 54°12′49″N 17°43′0″E
- Country: Poland
- Voivodeship: Pomeranian
- County: Bytów
- Gmina: Parchowo
- Population: 16

Parchowski Młyn [parˈxɔfski ˈmwɨn] is a village in the administrative district of Gmina Parchowo, within Bytów County, Pomeranian Voivodeship, in northern Poland.

For details of the history of the region, see History of Pomerania.
