= Gmina Parchowo =

Gmina Parchowo Gmina Parchòwò Parchowo Commune
- Gmina
- Coat of arms
- Interactive map of Gmina Parchowo; Gmina Parchòwò
- Coordinates (Parchowo): 54°12′23″N 17°40′5″E
- Country: Poland
- Voivodeship: Pomeranian
- County: Bytów
- Seat: Parchowo

Government
  - Mayor: Andrzej Dołębski (2006)

Area
  - Total: 130.91 km^{2} (50.54 sq mi)

Population (2006)
  - Total: 3,407
  - Density: 26.03/km^{2} (67.41/sq mi)
- Website: http://www.parchowo.pl

Gmina Parchowo (Kashubian: Gmina Parchòwò) is a rural gmina (administrative district) in Bytów County, Pomeranian Voivodeship, in northern Poland. Its seat is the village of Parchowo, which lies approximately 14 kilometres (9 mi) north-east of Bytów and 66 km (41 mi) west of the regional capital Gdańsk.

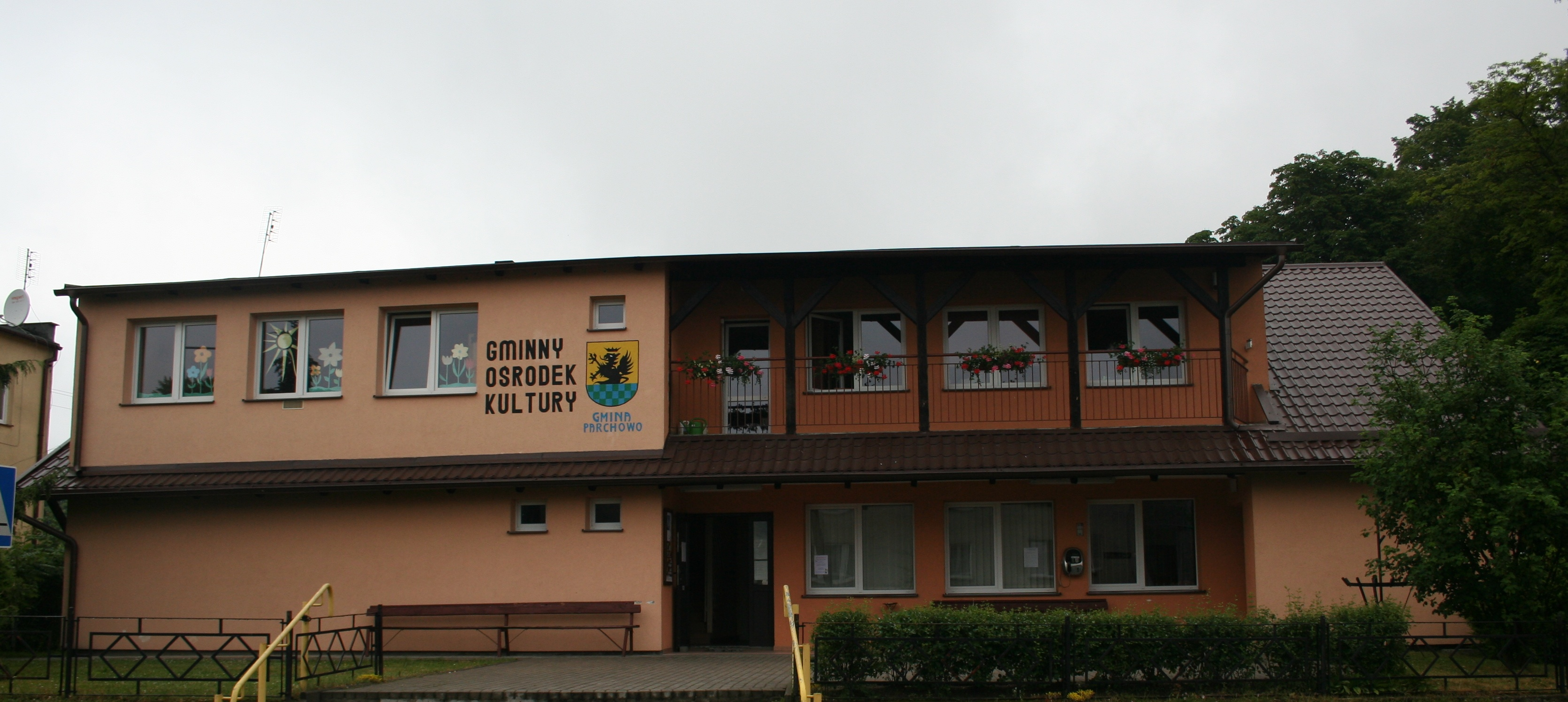

The gmina covers an area of 130.91 square kilometres (50.5 sq mi), and as of 2006 its total population is 3,407.

== Neighbouring gminas ==
Gmina Parchowo is bordered by the gminas of Bytów, Czarna Dąbrówka, Lipusz, Sierakowice, Studzienice and Sulęczyno.
