= Rudno =

Rudno may refer to:

In Poland:

- Rudno, Greater Poland Voivodeship, west-central Poland
- Rudno, Lesser Poland Voivodeship, south Poland
  - Rudno Landscape Park, a protected area in Lesser Poland Voivodeship
- Rudno, Lower Silesian Voivodeship, south-west Poland
- Rudno, Chełm County in Lublin Voivodeship, east Poland
- Rudno, Lubartów County in Lublin Voivodeship, east Poland
- Rudno, Parczew County in Lublin Voivodeship, east Poland
- Rudno, Lubusz Voivodeship, west Poland
- Rudno, Mińsk County in Masovian Voivodeship, east-central Poland
- Rudno, Otwock County in Masovian Voivodeship, east-central Poland
- Rudno, Przysucha County in Masovian Voivodeship, east-central Poland
- Rudno, Pomeranian Voivodeship, north Poland
- Rudno, Silesian Voivodeship, south Poland
- Rudno, Warmian-Masurian Voivodeship, north-east Poland
- Rudno, West Pomeranian Voivodeship, north-west Poland
- Rudno, Gdańsk, a district of Śródmieście, Gdańsk

In Russia:

- Rudno, Russia, name of several rural localities in Russia

In Serbia:

- Rudno (Kraljevo), a village

In Slovakia:

- Rudno, Slovakia, a village in the Žilina region

In Slovenia:

- Rudno, Železniki, a village in the Municipality of Železniki, northwestern Slovenia

In Ukraine:

- Rudno, Ukraine, a rural settlement in Lviv Oblast

== See also ==
- Rudno Dolne
- Rudno Górne
- Rudno Jeziorowe
- Rudno Kmiece
