= Opływ Motławy =

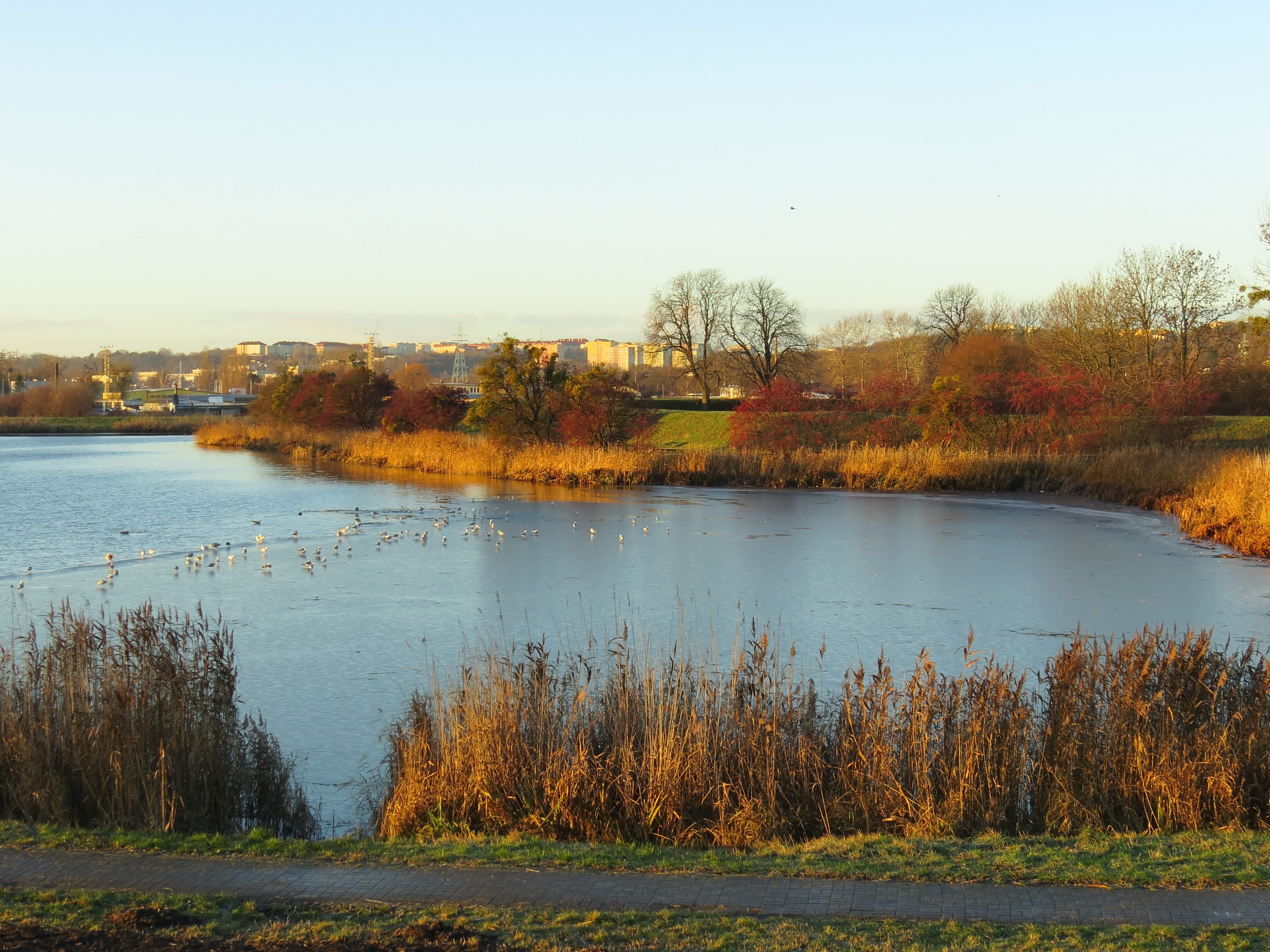
- Opływ Motławy in Dolne Miasto

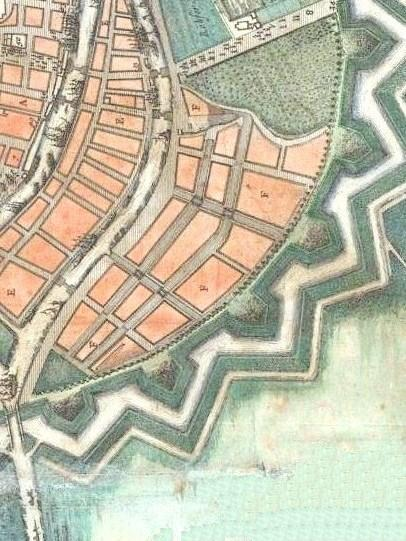
- A 1687 map of what is today called the Opływ Motławy
- Location: Gdańsk
- Country: Poland
- Coordinates: 54.3446°N 18.6720°E

History
- Date completed: 1638

Geography
- Start point: Zaroślak
- End point: Sienna Grobla
- Beginning coordinates: 54.3410°N 18.6438°E
- Ending coordinates: 54.3540°N 18.6778°E
- Connects to: Radunia Canal; Motława; Martwa Wisła

The Opływ Motławy (German: Umfluter; lit. 'Motława Flow-around') is the name given to the remaining part of the moat that was once part of the 17th-century fortifications of the city of Gdańsk. Although underdeveloped, it has been undergoing revitalizaton efforts since the 1990s.

== Characteristics ==
The Opływ Motławy goes from the vicinity of the Radunia Canal, where it intersects with the Motława, towards the north, where it empties into the Martwa Wisła. It is found on the border of the district of Śródmieście and the two districts of Olszynka and Rudniki. In the south, it is bounded by several preserved bastions, those being św. Gertrudy (St. Gertrude's), Żubr (Bison), Wilk (Wolf), Wyskok (Leap), Miś (Bear), and Królik (Bunny). A pier for kayakers is found on the banks of the Opływ Motławy, by the Wilk (Wolf) Bastion. The Opływ Motławy is a popular location for kayaking in the city, being found on numerous kayaking routes.

Environmentally, the Opływ Motławy is dense in numerous species of plants and animals. Trees growing in the area include old maples, ashes, and horse chestnuts; other plants include photinia shrubs, yellow water lilies, and white water lilies. Birds residing on and around the Opływ include the mute swan, the little grebe, the common moorhen, and the sand martin. The Eurasian wigeon and Canada geese also occasionally appear.

== History ==
From 1626 to 1638, a large moat, armed with a total of 20 bastions, was constructed to surround and defend the city of Gdańsk; the western and northern sections of the moat were ultimately covered up in the 1890s and 1900s, and some of the bastions in the current-day northern section of the Opływ (named Kasztanek, Jednorożec, Lew, and Wół) were also destroyed, and the location of its confluence into the Martwa Wisła was moved as not to disturb the traffic coming onto the Stagnete Bridge (today known as the Most Siennicki).

This remnant was first given the German name of the Umfluter in 1911. Starting in the late 1950s, the terrain was neglected and became unkempt, surrounded by dense plant life and illegally-constructed allotment gardens. In 1996, the city government of Gdańsk began a revitalization project of the Opływ. The project included the creation of a new Recreation Centre next to the Opływ, as well as paving 12 kilometres (7.5 mi) of new walking and cycling paths, creating new parking spaces, restoring the bastions to their historical forms, installing new floodproofing measures, whilst the bastions were developed with new locations for relaxation, observation points, benches, and stylized street lanterns.

Since 2020, the city of Gdańsk has further revitalize the Opływ Motławy. Projects included in the revitalization include the installment of 18 new historical information boards, the creation of more spaces for relaxation and observation on the bastions, and a total reconstruction of one of the bastions, Królik.
