= Gdańsk bus station =

Bus station in central Gdańsk

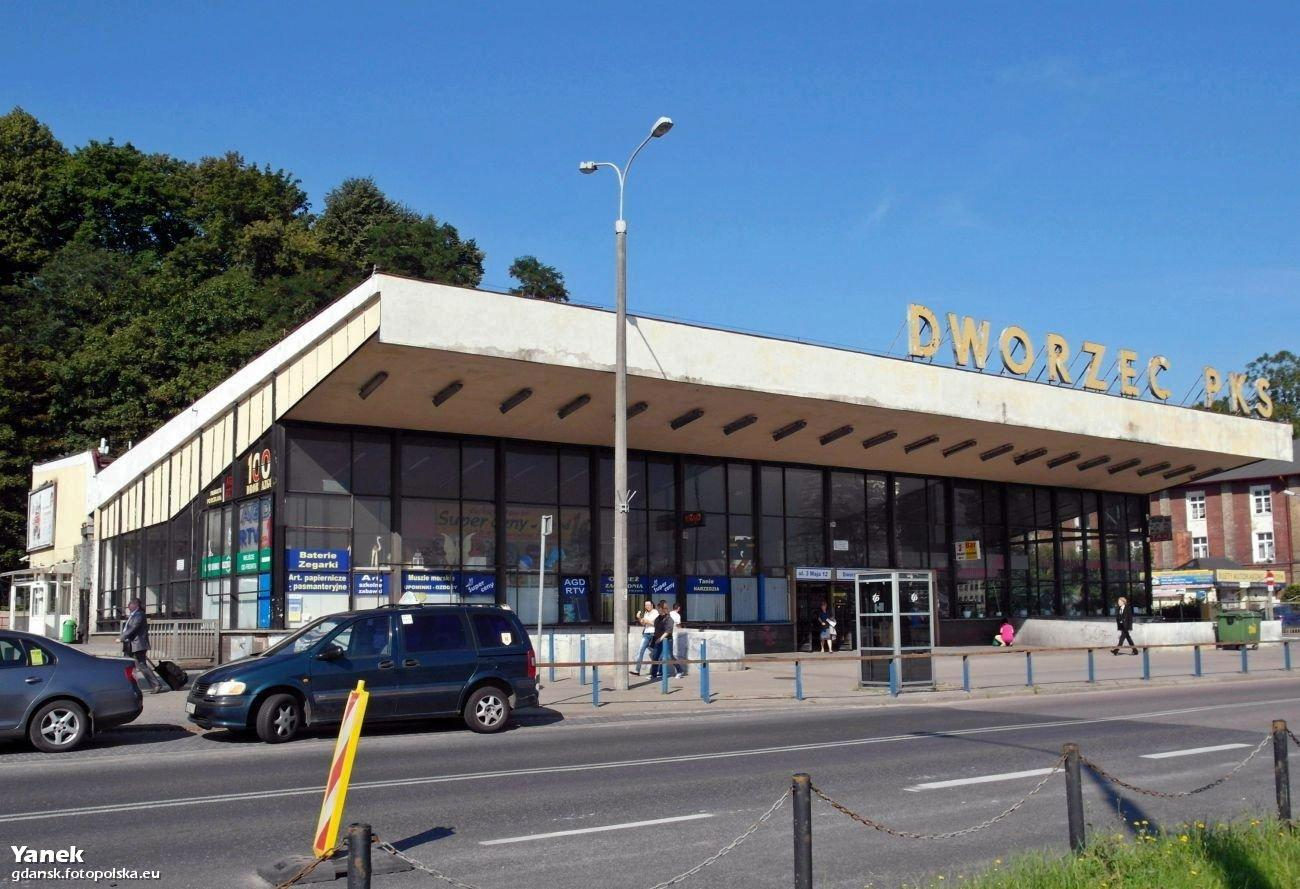
- The bus station building

General information
- Location: ul. 3 Maja 12; Grodzisko, Śródmieście, Gdańsk
- Coordinates: 54.3563°N 18.6427°E
- System: Bus station
- Owner: Przedsiębiorstwo Budowlane Górski

History
- Opened: 18 March 1973
Location

The Gdańsk bus station is a bus station located in central Gdańsk; it is the city's central bus terminal. Since 2012, it has been owned by the company Przedsiębiorstwo Budowlane Górski.

== History ==
The station was opened on 18 March 1973; its owner was PKS Gdańsk, the local branch of Przedsiębiorstwo Komunikacji Samochodowej, Poland's main intercity bus company. It has been repeatedly criticized for its architecture, and proposals have been put forward to demolish or rebuild it, especially in the buildup to the UEFA Euro 2012.

The construction of a hotel on its grounds has frequently numbered among the suggestions, and renditions of various such plans have been discussed and proposed with growing success up to 2024.
