= Stare Przedmieście =

Quarter of Śródmieście, Gdańsk

- Quarter (osiedle)
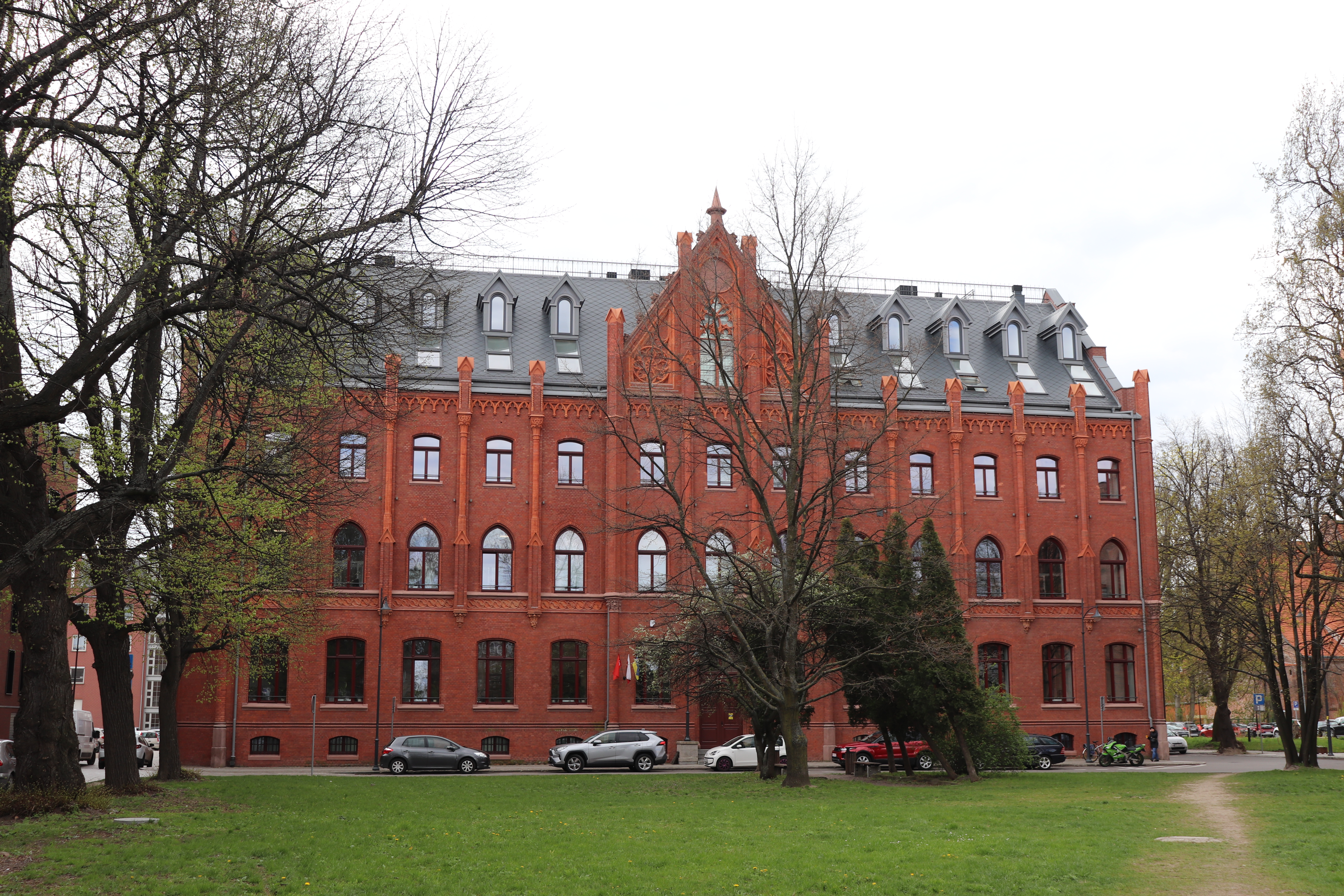
- The Stare Przedmieście, Old Post

- Stare Przedmieście within Śródmieście
- Interactive map of Stare Przedmieście
- Coordinates: 54.3413°N 18.6491°E
- Country: Poland
- Voivodeship: Pomeranian
- City: Gdańsk
- District: Śródmieście
- Incorporated into Gdańsk: 14th century

Stare Przedmieście (German: Vorstadt) is a quarter (osiedle) of the district of Śródmieście, within the city of Gdańsk.

== Location ==
Stare Przedmieście is located in the southern part of Śródmieście. It borders Wyspa Spichrzów, Dolne Miasto, and Główne Miasto. Physically, it is bound by the Motława from the east, the Brama Nizinna to the south, the Radunia Canal to the west, and the Podwale Przedmiejskie to the north.

== History ==
An unfortified area of the Główne Miasto (Main City), Stare Przedmieście became part of the city of Gdańsk in the 14th century.

The first area to be settled was located around a large shipyard, inhabited by 2,000 people by 1430. Over the centuries, the area's economic importance increased significantly. In the 17th century, the size of Stare Przedmieście increased, while the fortifications separating Główne Miasto from Stare Przedmieście, among them a moat, were removed.

Prior to the removal of the fortifications, they separated the quarter from Główne Miasto, primarily by walls and fortified towers, as well as gates. Several of the old towers remain in existence to this day. The aforementioned shipyard built ships for buyers across Europe, including those in England, Flanders, Holland, and Italy. Starting in 1580, the area was home to the Academic Gymnasium (Polish: Gimnazjum Akademickie), where several scholars, including Johannes Hevelius, studied.

The shipyard in Vorstadt, as it was known in German, remained operational until 1870. Following the closure of the Academic Gymnasium, the Gymnasium's building became home to the Gdańsk Museum in 1873. In 1945, during the siege of Danzig, Vorstadt was destroyed. Thus, today, post-war architecture dominates the area. It is also home to the sejmik of Pomeranian Voivodeship.
