= Nowe Ogrody, Gdańsk =

Quarter of Śródmieście, Gdańsk

Nowe Ogrody
- Quarter (osiedle)
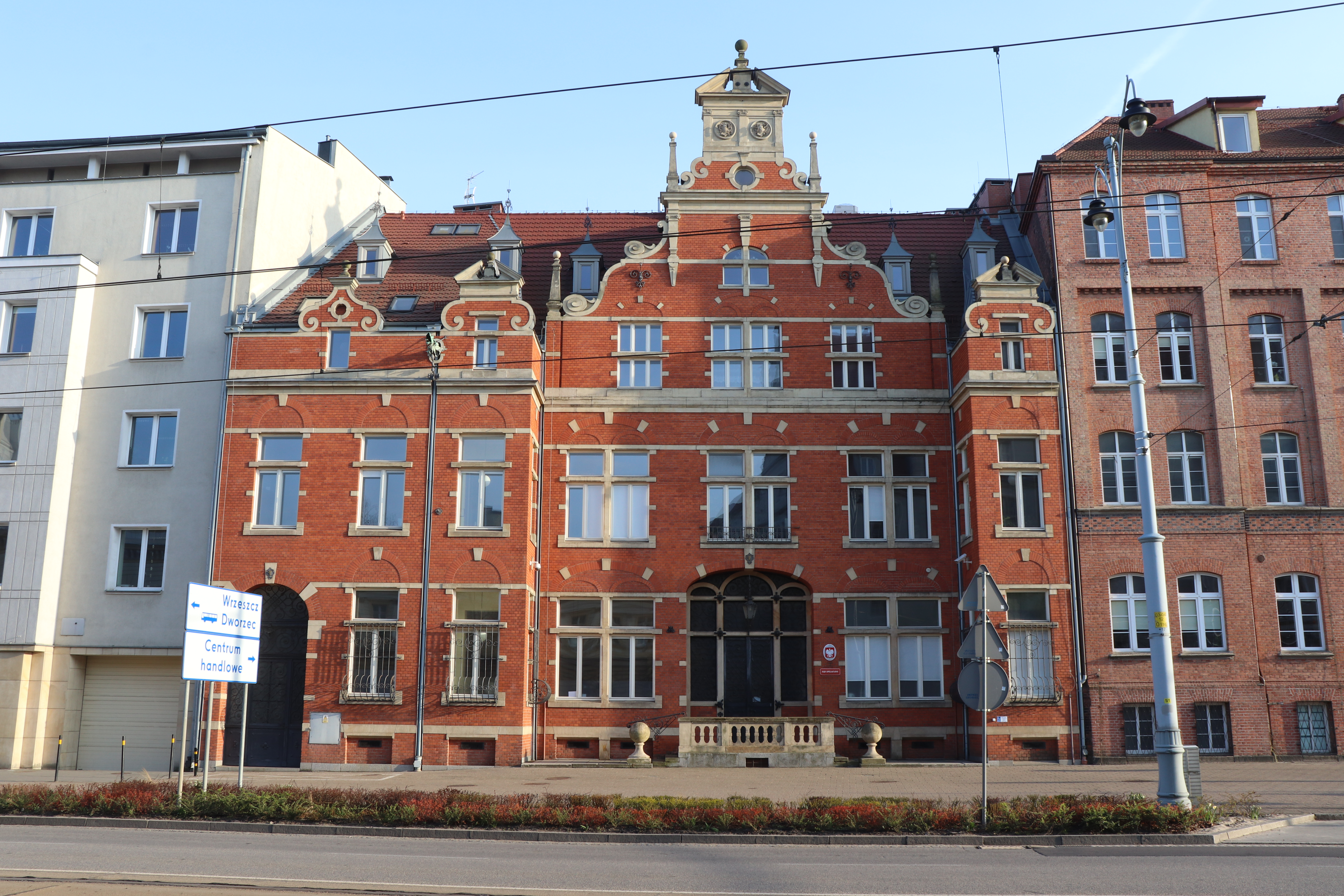
- Buildings along Nowe Ogrody Street

- Nowe Ogrody within Śródmieście
- Interactive map of Nowe Ogrody
- Coordinates: 54.3514°N 18.6378°E
- Country: Poland
- Voivodeship: Pomeranian
- City: Gdańsk
- District: Śródmieście
- Incorporated into Gdańsk: 1656

Nowe Ogrody (German: Neugarten; Kashubian: Glëkowo) is a quarter (osiedle) and eponymous road in Śródmieście, a district of Gdańsk.

== History ==
Nowe Ogrody was owned by the Main City as of 1378, while the first building known to have been constructed there was completed in 1342 – a church and hospital dedicated to Saint Gertrude. Starting in the 16th century, it was a suburb of the then-growing city of Danzig (later Gdańsk), and became part of Danzig administratively in 1656.

For much of Nowe Ogrody's history, it was separated from the rest of Gdańsk by the Nowe Ogrody Gate (German: Neugarten Tor; Polish: Brama Nowych Ogrodów), removed in the 19th century.

In the 19th century, it became home to various government institutions, including the "Kurkowa" prison, as well as the central administrative building of the province of West Prussia. The Senate of the Free City of Danzig and its Volkstag were located on Neugarten (Nowe Ogrody) Street during the independence of the Free City of Danzig. Both buildings were destroyed during the siege of Danzig in 1945. Other investments included a building for the province's Oberpräsidium and a regional courthouse.
