= Plewnik, Masovian Voivodeship =

Plewnik
- Village
- Location within Poland
- Coordinates: 53°10′N 20°53′E
- Country: Poland
- Voivodeship: Masovian
- County: Przasnysz
- Gmina: Krzynowłoga Mała

Plewnik [ˈplɛvnik] is a village in the administrative district of Gmina Krzynowłoga Mała, within Przasnysz County, Masovian Voivodeship, in east-central Poland.
