= Rudno-Kosiły =

- Village
- Location within Poland
- Coordinates: 53°07′30″N 20°43′25″E
- Country: Poland
- Voivodeship: Masovian
- County: Przasnysz
- Gmina: Krzynowłoga Mała

Rudno-Kosiły [kɔˈɕiwɨ] (to 2010 known as Kosiły) is a village in the administrative district of Gmina Krzynowłoga Mała, within Przasnysz County, Masovian Voivodeship, in east-central Poland.
