= Bystre-Chrzany =

- Village
- Location within Poland
- Coordinates: 53°12′12″N 20°46′9″E
- Country: Poland
- Voivodeship: Masovian
- County: Przasnysz
- Gmina: Krzynowłoga Mała

Bystre-Chrzany [ˈbɨstrɛ ˈxʂanɨ] is a village in the administrative district of Gmina Krzynowłoga Mała, within Przasnysz County, Masovian Voivodeship, in east-central Poland.
