= Długie Ogrody =

Quarter of Śródmieście, Gdańsk

- Quarter (osiedle)
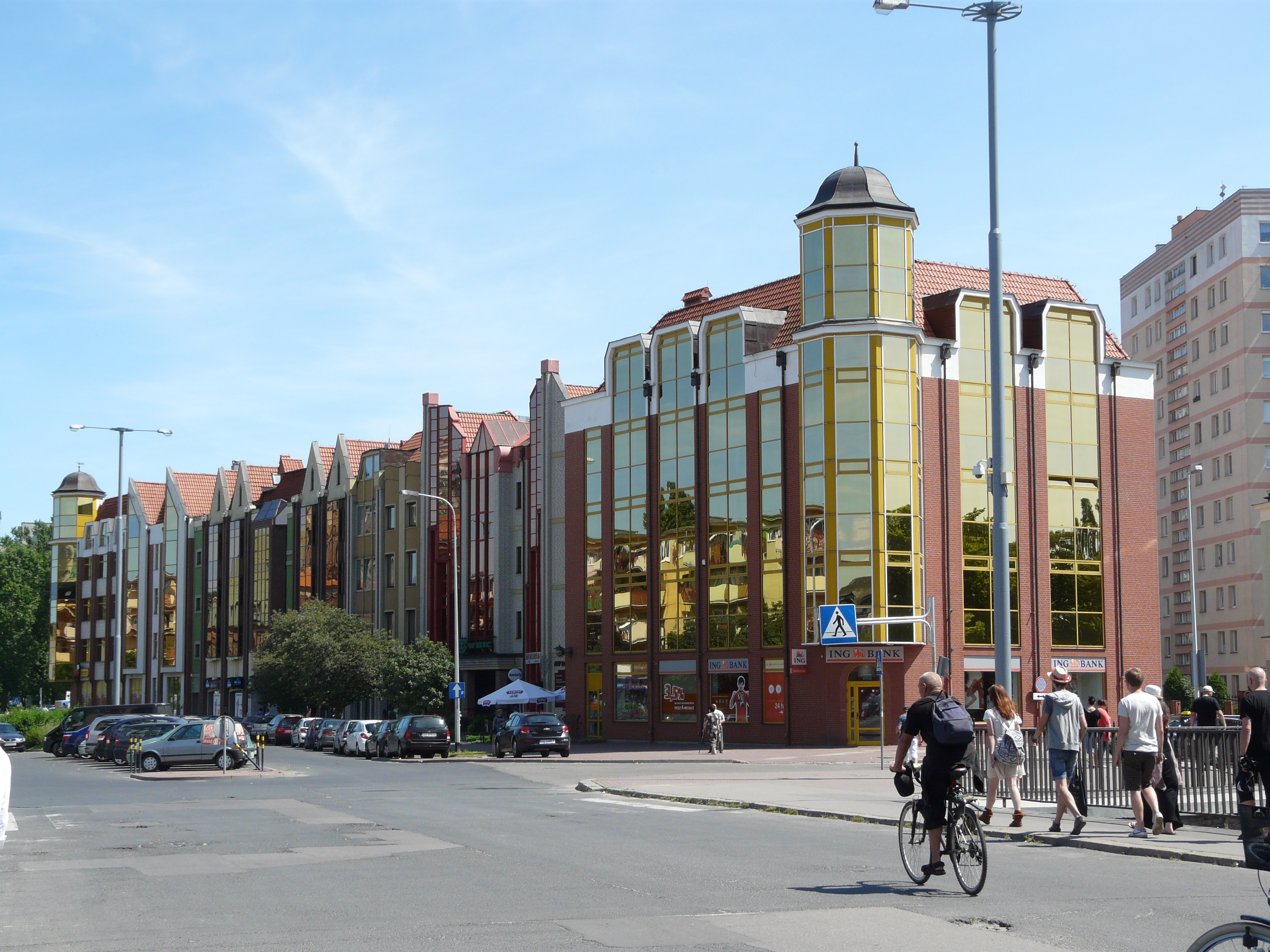
- Buildings along Długie Ogrody Street

- Długie Ogrody within Śródmieście
- Interactive map of Długie Ogrody
- Coordinates: 54.3450°N 18.6608°E
- Country: Poland
- Voivodeship: Pomeranian
- City: Gdańsk
- District: Śródmieście
- Incorporated into Gdańsk: 14th and 15th century

Długie Ogrody (German: Langgarten) is a quarter (osiedle) and eponymous road located in Śródmieście, a district of the city of Gdańsk.

== History ==
The name of Długie Ogrody, meaning Long Gardens in Polish, derives from the gardens that dominated the area in the Middle Ages and early modern period. Długie Ogrody is the name of its central street, which is also known as Elbląska. In the 15th century, it became a suburb of Główne Miasto, along with being the location of the residences of several notable people, including Peter the Great and Stanisław Leszczyński.

During the 19th century, industrial activity increased in Długie Ogrody, known as Langgarten in German, and starting in 1885, a tram line was operational there. In 1945, Langgarten was destroyedd on account of being along the path of German soldiers withdrawing from Bohnsack during the siege of Danzig. The district was rebuilt with post-war communist architecture, including several large apartment buildings inhabited by workers of the Remontowa Shipyard.

Starting in 2016, proposals have been prominently discussed regarding the renewal of Długie Ogrody and several are currently in effect or soon to be in effect.
