= Kawieczyno =

- Village
- Location within Poland
- Coordinates: 53°11′21″N 20°45′05″E
- Country: Poland
- Voivodeship: Masovian
- County: Przasnysz
- Gmina: Krzynowłoga Mała

Kawieczyno [kavjɛˈt͡ʂɨnɔ sakˈsarɨ] (to 2010 known as Kawieczyno-Saksary) is a village in the administrative district of Gmina Krzynowłoga Mała, within Przasnysz County, Masovian Voivodeship, in east-central Poland.
