= Ulatowo-Zalesie =

- Village
- Location within Poland
- Coordinates: 53°10′57″N 20°54′37″E
- Country: Poland
- Voivodeship: Masovian
- County: Przasnysz
- Gmina: Krzynowłoga Mała

Ulatowo-Zalesie [ulaˈtɔvɔ zaˈlɛɕɛ] is a village in the administrative district of Gmina Krzynowłoga Mała, within Przasnysz County, Masovian Voivodeship, in east-central Poland.
