= Ulatowo-Żyły =

- Village
- Location within Poland
- Coordinates: 53°09′57″N 20°54′38″E
- Country: Poland
- Voivodeship: Masovian
- County: Przasnysz
- Gmina: Krzynowłoga Mała

Ulatowo-Żyły [ulaˈtɔvɔ ˈʐɨwɨ] is a village in the administrative district of Gmina Krzynowłoga Mała, within Przasnysz County, Masovian Voivodeship, in east-central Poland.
