= Krajewo-Kłódki =

- Village
- Location within Poland
- Coordinates: 53°10′58″N 20°46′44″E
- Country: Poland
- Voivodeship: Masovian
- County: Przasnysz
- Gmina: Krzynowłoga Mała
- Population (approx.): 50

Krajewo-Kłódki [kraˈjɛvɔ ˈkwutki] is a village in the administrative district of Gmina Krzynowłoga Mała, within Przasnysz County, Masovian Voivodeship, in east-central Poland.
