= Borowe-Gryki =

- Village
- Location within Poland
- Coordinates: 53°7′44″N 20°47′15″E
- Country: Poland
- Voivodeship: Masovian
- County: Przasnysz
- Gmina: Krzynowłoga Mała
- Population: 70

Borowe-Gryki [bɔˈrɔvɛ ˈɡrɨki] is a village in the administrative district of Gmina Krzynowłoga Mała, within Przasnysz County, Masovian Voivodeship, in east-central Poland.
