= Grabowo-Rżańce =

- Village
- Location within Poland
- Coordinates: 53°12′25″N 20°45′42″E
- Country: Poland
- Voivodeship: Masovian
- County: Przasnysz
- Gmina: Krzynowłoga Mała

Grabowo-Rżańce [ɡraˈbɔvɔ ˈrʐaɲt͡sɛ] is a village in the administrative district of Gmina Krzynowłoga Mała, within Przasnysz County, Masovian Voivodeship, in east-central Poland.

During Nazi Occupation it was part of New Berlin military training area
