= Main City Hall =

Coordinates: 54.3488°N 18.6526°E

- Ratusz Głównego Miasta
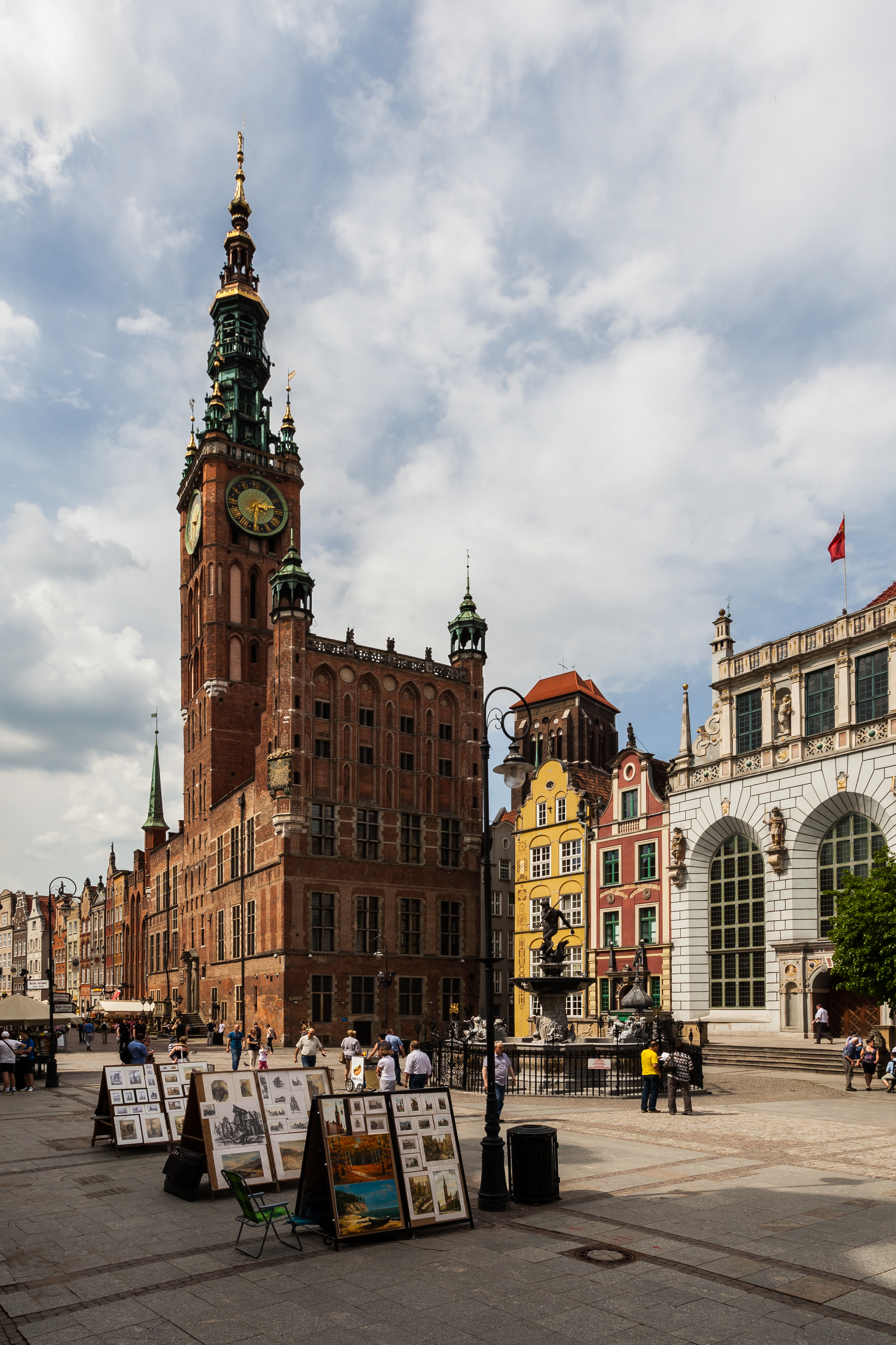
- The Main City Hall in 2013
- Interactive map of the Main City Hall area

General information
- Type: Town hall
- Architectural style: Renaissance-Baroque
- Location: Gdańsk, Poland
- Construction started: 1346
- Completed: 15th century

Height
- Height: 83.45 metres
- Historical Museum of the City of Gdańsk

Historic Monument of Poland
- Designated: 1994-09-08
- Part of: Gdańsk – city within the 17th-century fortifications
- Reference no.: M.P. 1994 nr 50 poz. 415

Main City Hall (Polish: Ratusz Głównego Miasta; German: Rechtstädtisches Rathaus) is a historic town hall located in Gdańsk, Poland, within the Main City borough of the Downtown district. It is one of the finest examples of the Gothic-Renaissance historic buildings in the city, built at the intersection of Ulica Długa (Long Lane) and Długi Targ (Long Market), in the most popular part of Gdańsk. The Main Town Hall in Gdańsk houses the History Museum of the City of Gdańsk.

== Location ==
The Main Town Hall in Gdańsk is located on Ulica Długa, part of the Royal Route. The building is located in the building complex, surrounded by Ulica Długa, Kramarska Street, Piwna Street, and Kaletnicza Street, located at the corner of the first two. The building is the second highest building in the Main City (after St. Mary's Church), and is in the most notable part of Śródmieście in Gdańsk. Access to the building by car is difficult, as Ulica Długa is pedestrianised all year around. The public transport does not reach the building. The closest tram stop is located at Podwale Przedmiejskie.

== History ==
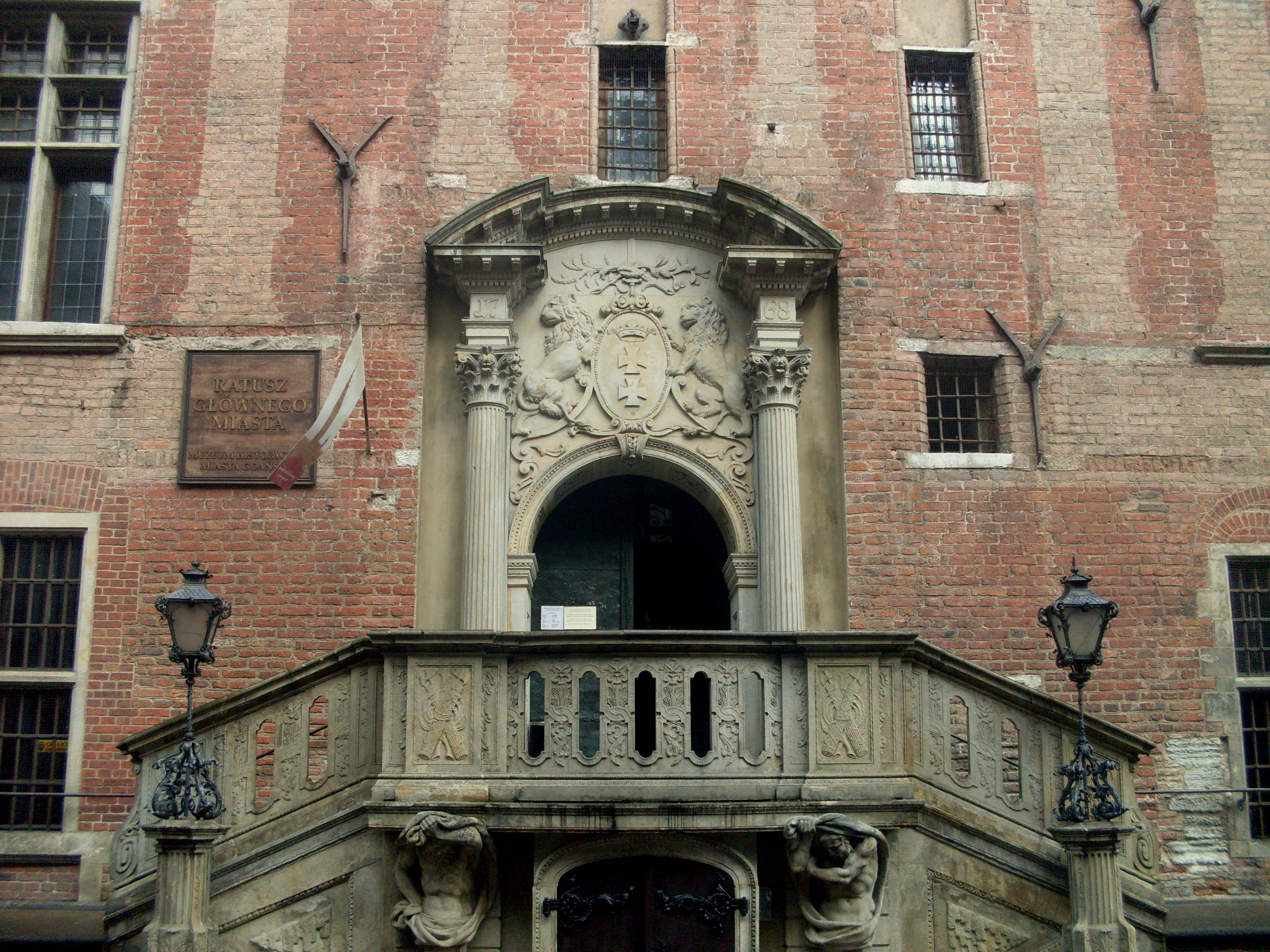
Front door and portal with the coat of arms of Gdańsk

The oldest fragments of the town hall come from 1327 to 1336 - the building was then much smaller in size, which led to its expansion in the subsequent years. In the fourteenth-century the Main City of Gdańsk was reconstructed, and in 1346 replaced the then enforced Lübeck law with the Kulm law. The reform had separated the roles of the city council and ława miejska (which was responsible for the judiciary). The separation of the two bodies led to the need for two separate halls for the two institutions. In 1357, in the location of the current town hall, a temporary town hall was located.

The first major expansion of the building began in 1378, after the full Kulm law was given to the city. The expansion of the building was led by Henryk Ungerdin, and the reconstruction was complete in 1382. Between 1454 and 1457, with the relation of the arrival of King Casimir IV Jagiellon, the town hall was expanded. The town hall's tower was complete in the years of 1486-1488; the building of which was led by Henryk Hetzel. The tower was completed by Michał Enkinger, with a high dome in 1492, which had burnt down in 1494. In 1504, the town hall was visited by King Alexander Jagiellon.

After a fire in 1556, the town hall was rebuilt and expanded with Renaissance influences by Dutch architects and master-builders, including Wilhem van den Meer, Dirk Daniels, and Anthonis van Obbergen. In 1561, a gilded weathervane statuette of the Polish King Sigismund II Augustus was placed at the top of the tower. The tower also features a carillon.

The 'Red Room,' designed by Dutch architect Hans Vredeman de Vries, can be considered one of the most outstanding examples of Dutch Mannerism in Gdańsk.

Heavily damaged in WW2, with the loss of the top of the tower, the town hall was carefully repaired and reconstructed, largely complete by 1952.

== Gallery ==
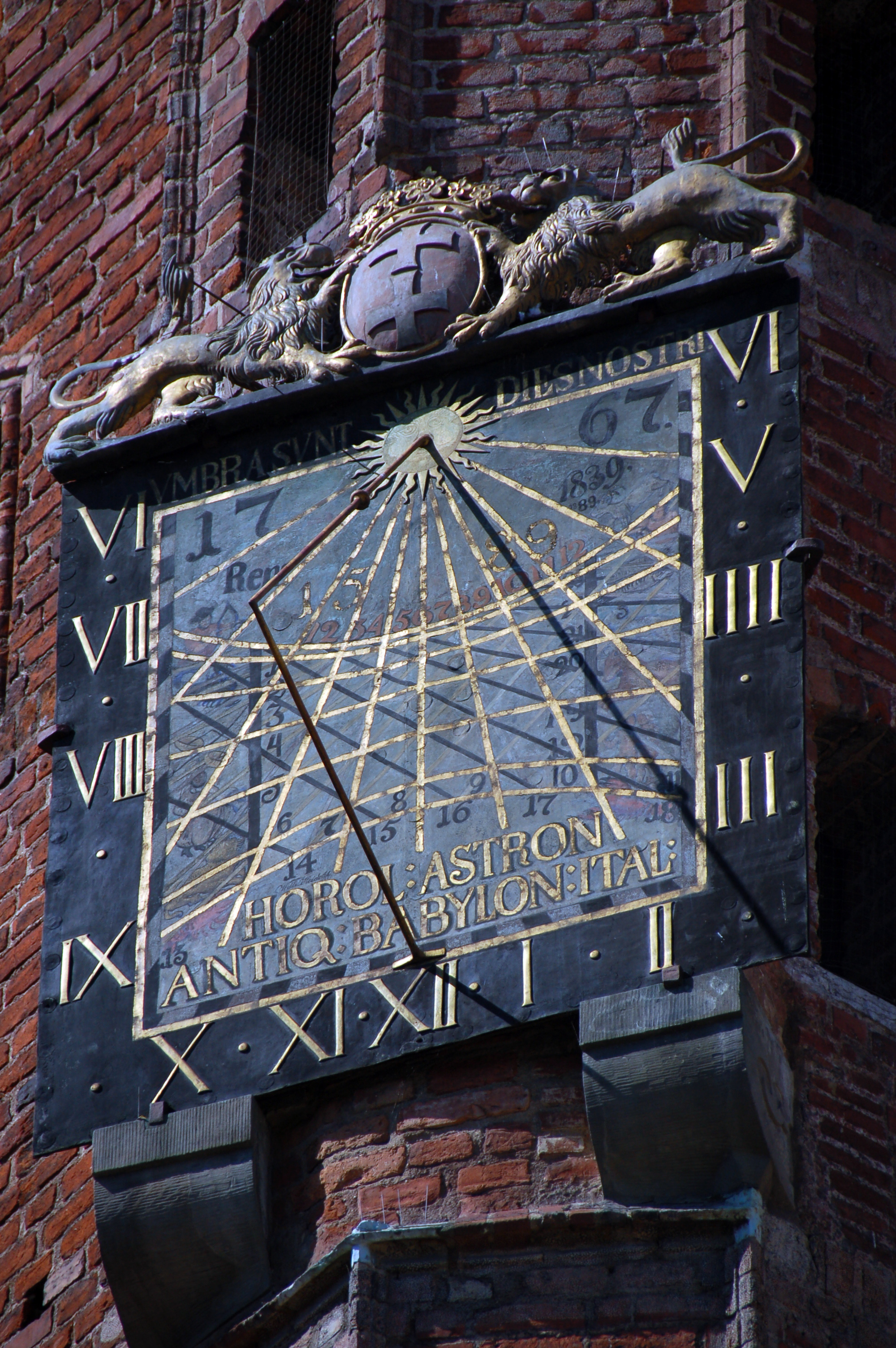
Sundia

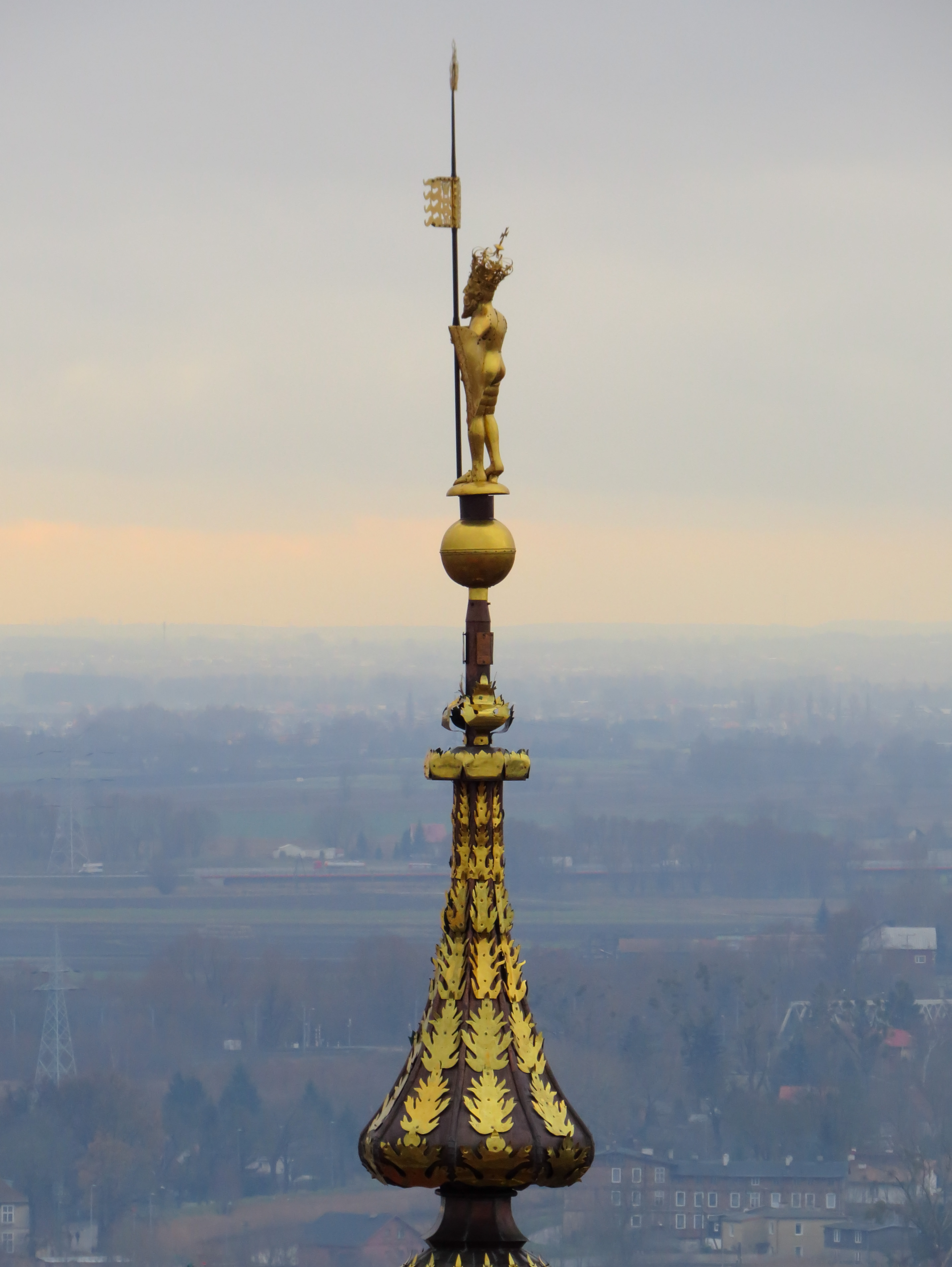
A weathervane towertop with a statue of King Sigismund II Augustus

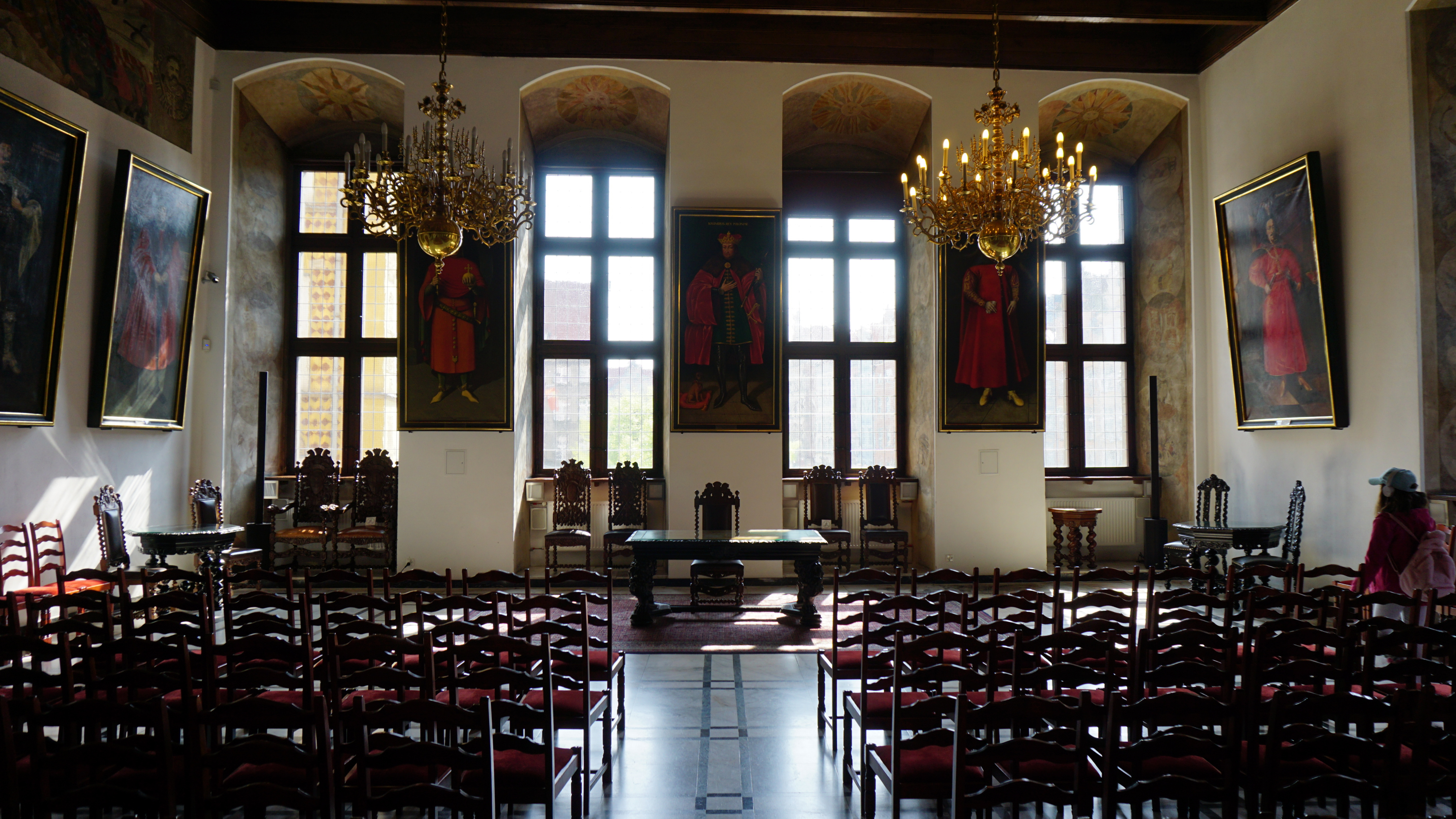
White Room

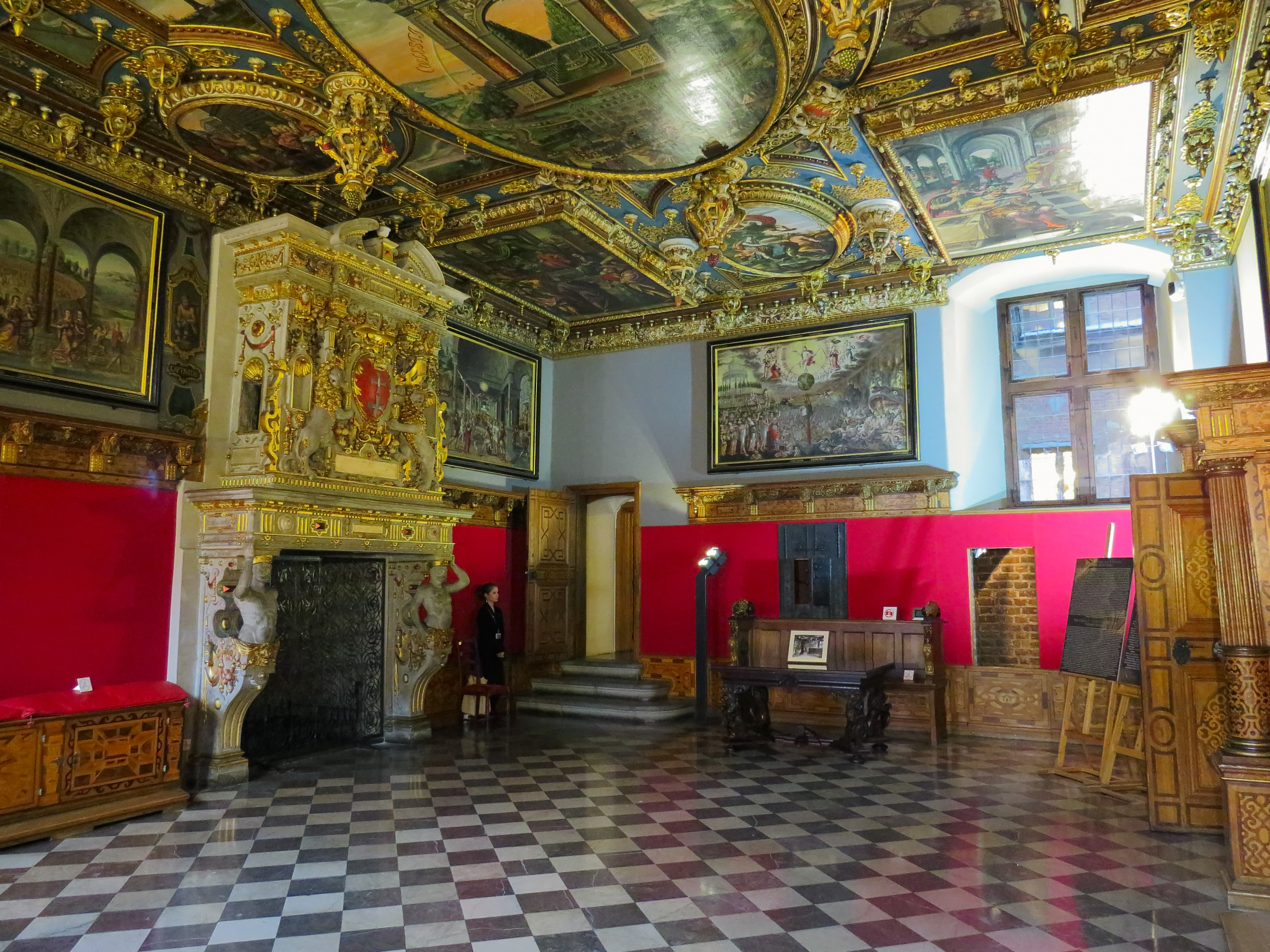
Red Room

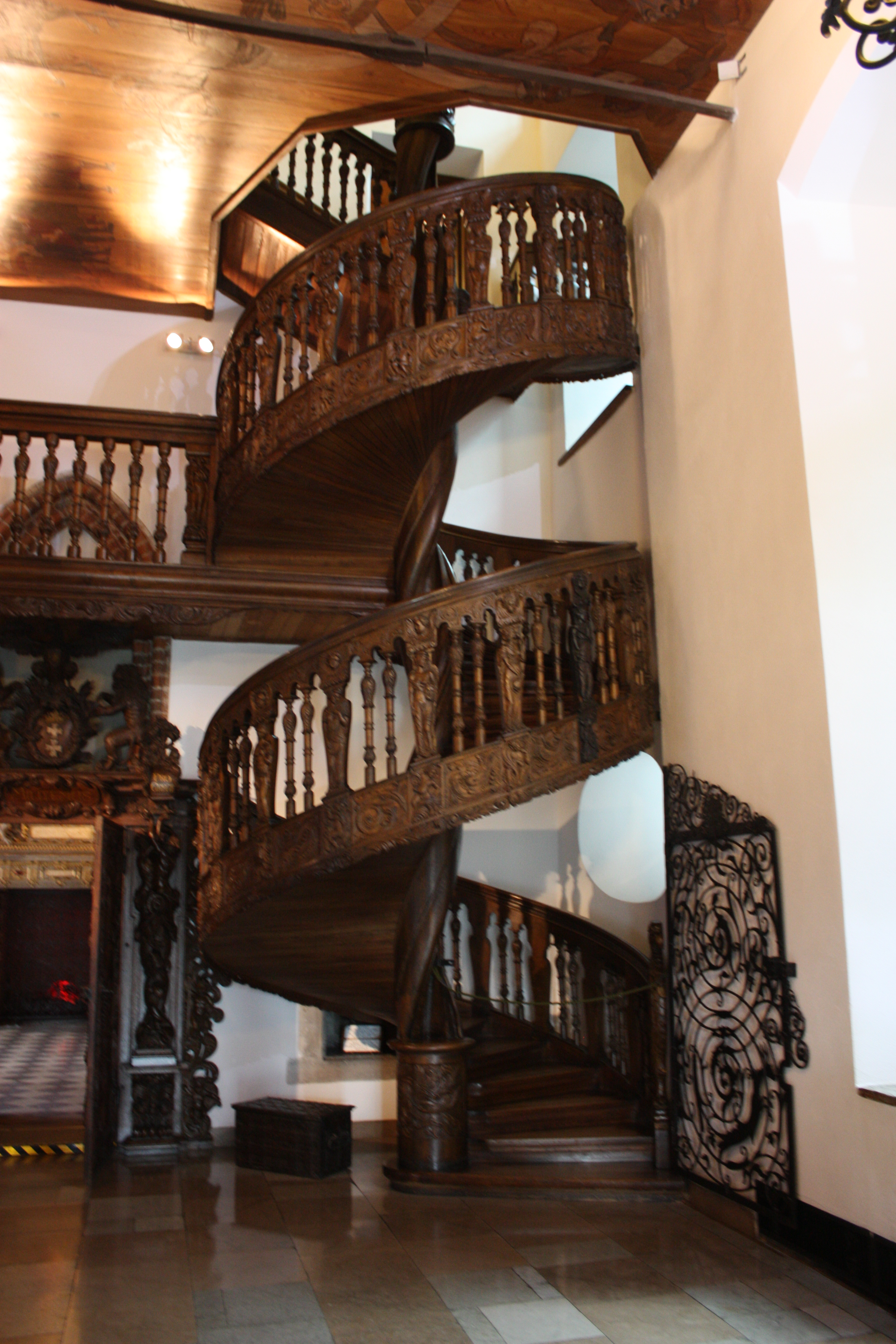
Spiral stairs
