= Borowe-Chrzczany =

- Village
- Location within Poland
- Coordinates: 53°07′33.33″N 20°46′44.8″E
- Country: Poland
- Voivodeship: Masovian
- County: Przasnysz
- Gmina: Krzynowłoga Mała

Borowe-Chrzczany [bɔˈrɔvɛ ˈxʂt͡ʂanɨ] is a village in the administrative district of Gmina Krzynowłoga Mała, within Przasnysz County, Masovian Voivodeship, in east-central Poland.
