= Gmina Krzynowłoga Mała =

Gmina Krzynowłoga Mała Krzynowłoga Mała Commune
- Gmina
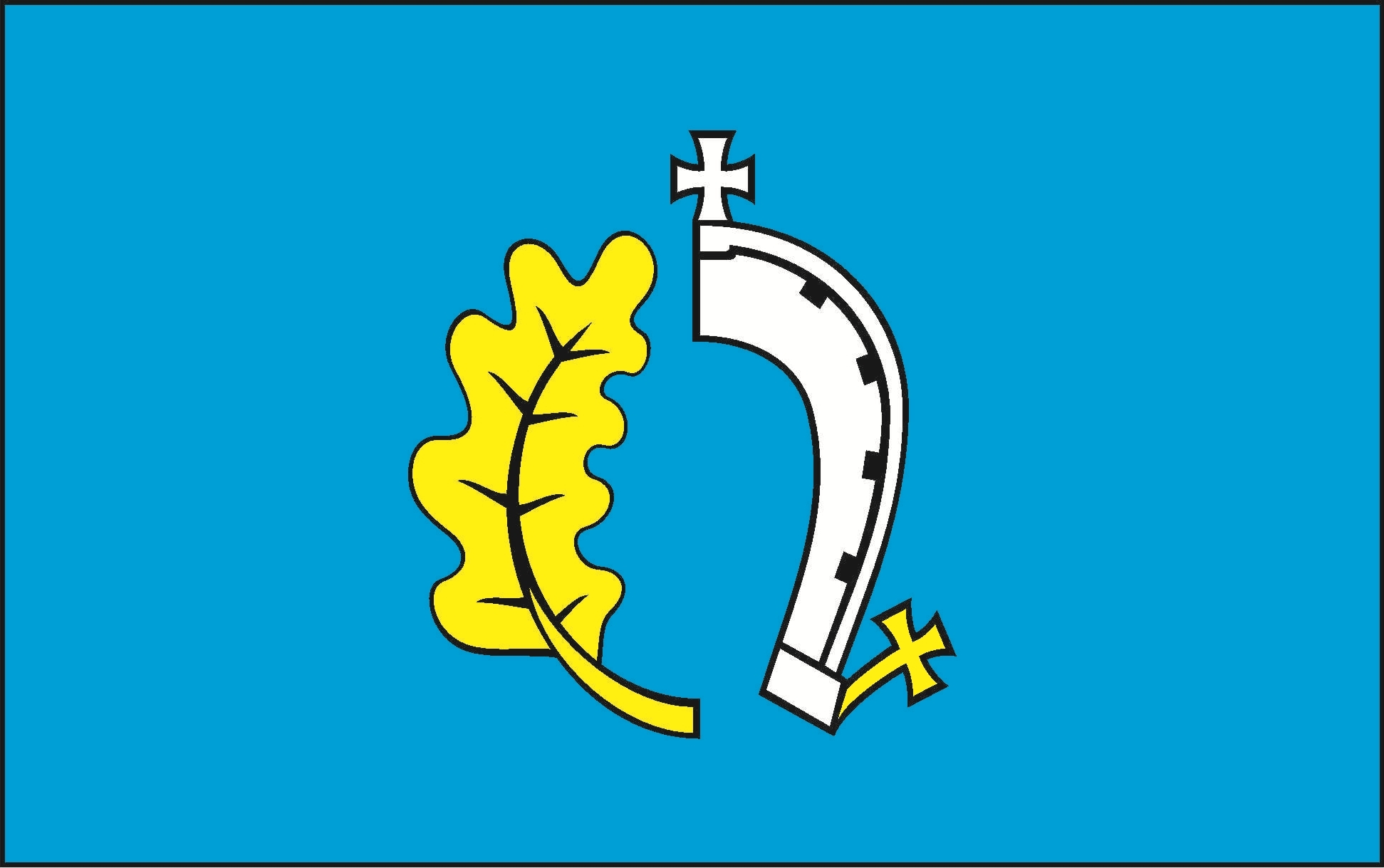
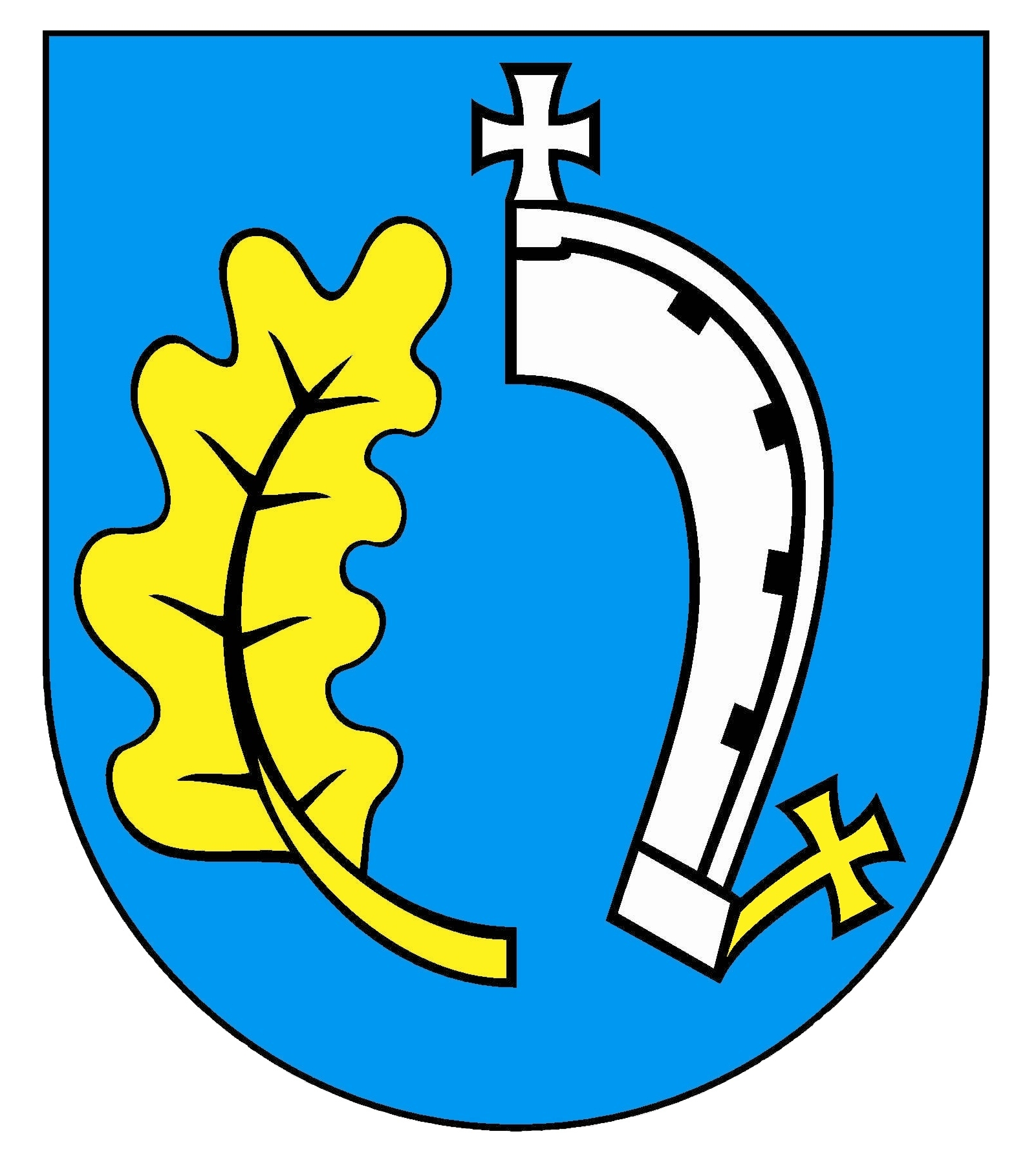
- Flag Coat of arms
- Interactive map of Gmina Krzynowłoga Mała
- Coordinates (Krzynowłoga Mała): 53°10′N 20°48′E
- Country: Poland
- Voivodeship: Masovian
- County: Przasnysz
- Seat: Krzynowłoga Mała

Area
  - Total: 184.4 km^{2} (71.2 sq mi)

Population (2013)
  - Total: 3,599
  - Density: 19.52/km^{2} (50.55/sq mi)

Gmina Krzynowłoga Mała is a rural gmina (administrative district) in Przasnysz County, Masovian Voivodeship, in east-central Poland. Its seat is the village of Krzynowłoga Mała, which lies approximately 16 kilometres (10 mi) north-west of Przasnysz and 104 km (64 mi) north of Warsaw.

The gmina covers an area of 184.4 square kilometres (71.2 sq mi), and as of 2006 its total population is 3,535 (3,599 in 2013).

== Villages ==
Gmina Krzynowłoga Mała contains the villages and settlements of:

- Borowe-Chrzczany
- Borowe-Gryki
- Bystre-Chrzany
- Chmieleń Wielki
- Chmielonek
- Cichowo
- Czaplice-Bąki
- Czaplice-Kurki
- Gadomiec-Jędryki
- Gadomiec-Wyraki
- Goski-Wąsosze
- Grabowo-Rżańce
- Kaki-Mroczki
- Kawieczyno
- Rudno-Kosiły
- Krajewo Wielkie
- Krajewo-Kłódki
- Krajewo-Wierciochy
- Krzynowłoga Mała
- Łanięta
- Łoje
- Marianowo
- Masiak
- Morawy Wielkie
- Ostrowe-Stańczyki
- Ożumiech
- Piastowo
- Plewnik
- Romany-Fuszki
- Romany-Janowięta
- Romany-Sebory
- Romany-Sędzięta
- Rudno Jeziorowe
- Rudno Kmiece
- Skierkowizna
- Świniary
- Ulatowo-Adamy
- Ulatowo-Borzuchy
- Ulatowo-Czerniaki
- Ulatowo-Zalesie
- Ulatowo-Żyły
- Wiktorowo

== Neighbouring gminas ==
Gmina Krzynowłoga Mała is bordered by the gminas of Chorzele, Czernice Borowe, Dzierzgowo, Jednorożec and Przasnysz.
