= Łoje, Przasnysz County =

Łoje
- Village
- Location within Poland
- Coordinates: 53°8′N 20°49′E
- Country: Poland
- Voivodeship: Masovian
- County: Przasnysz
- Gmina: Krzynowłoga Mała

Łoje [ˈwɔjɛ] is a village in the administrative district of Gmina Krzynowłoga Mała, within Przasnysz County, Masovian Voivodeship, in east-central Poland.
