= Chmieleń Wielki =

- Village
- Location within Poland
- Coordinates: 53°11′N 20°45′E
- Country: Poland
- Voivodeship: Masovian
- County: Przasnysz
- Gmina: Krzynowłoga Mała
- Population: 130

Chmieleń Wielki (Polish pronunciation: [ˈxmjɛlɛj̃ ˈvjɛlkʲi]) is a village in the administrative district of Gmina Krzynowłoga Mała, within Przasnysz County, Masovian Voivodeship, in east-central Poland.
