= Romany-Janowięta =

- Village
- Location within Poland
- Coordinates: 53°05′46″N 20°51′59″E
- Country: Poland
- Voivodeship: Masovian
- County: Przasnysz
- Gmina: Krzynowłoga Mała

Romany-Janowięta [rɔˈmanɨ janɔˈvjɛnta] is a village in the administrative district of Gmina Krzynowłoga Mała, within Przasnysz County, Masovian Voivodeship, in east-central Poland.
