= Ulatowo-Czerniaki =

- Village
- Location within Poland
- Coordinates: 53°09′22″N 20°56′54″E
- Country: Poland
- Voivodeship: Masovian
- County: Przasnysz
- Gmina: Krzynowłoga Mała

Ulatowo-Czerniaki [ulaˈtɔvɔ t͡ʂɛrˈɲaki] is a village in the administrative district of Gmina Krzynowłoga Mała, within Przasnysz County, Masovian Voivodeship, in east-central Poland.
