= Rudno, Gdańsk =

Quarter of Śródmieście, Poland

Rudno
- Quarter (osiedle)
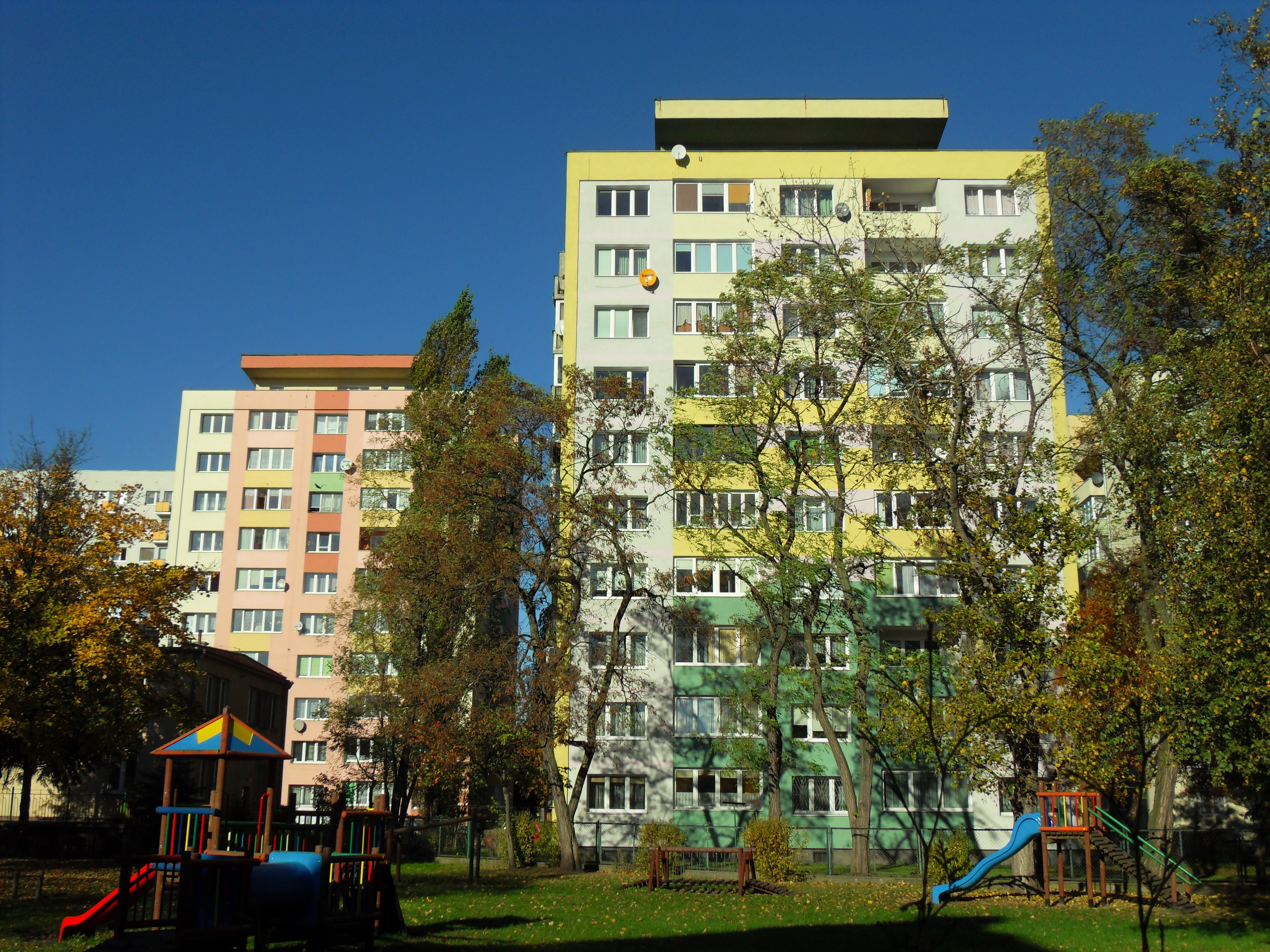
- Apartment buildings in Rudno

- Rudno within Śródmieście
- Interactive map of Rudno
- Coordinates: 54.3496°N 18.6727°E
- Country: Poland
- Voivodeship: Pomeranian
- City: Gdańsk
- District: Śródmieście
- Incorporated into Gdańsk: 1814

Rudno, commonly known as Knipawa (German: Kneipab), is a quarter (osiedle) of Śródmieście, a district of Gdańsk.

== History ==
Built up in the 15th and 16th centuries, Rudno, then known as Knipawa, comprised the eastern half of the quarter of Długie Ogrody, cut off by newly-built fortifications from the rest of the city in the 17th century. Knipawa began its slow growth after the removal of the city's fortifications. Starting in the 1900s through to the 1930s, new developments included a narrow-gauge railway connection, a road connection to a bridge across the Vistula, a sewage system, a new church dedicated to Our Lady of Sorrows, and a public swimming pool.

In 1945, the new Polish government of Gdańsk renamed Knipawa, the name of which meant "muddy island" in Polish, to Rudniki, which became Rudno in 1948. A large housing project, consisting of apartment buildings, was constructed there from 1959 to 1963, with 432 total apartments.
