= Piastowo, Przasnysz County =

Piastowo
- Village
- Location within Poland
- Coordinates: 53°9′52″N 20°49′0″E
- Country: Poland
- Voivodeship: Masovian
- County: Przasnysz
- Gmina: Krzynowłoga Mała
- Population: 100

Piastowo [ˈpjastuf] (until 2010 known as Piastów) is a village in the administrative district of Gmina Krzynowłoga Mała, within Przasnysz County, Masovian Voivodeship, in east-central Poland.
