= Gadomiec-Jędryki =

- Village
- Location within Poland
- Coordinates: 53°12′16″N 20°48′17″E
- Country: Poland
- Voivodeship: Masovian
- County: Przasnysz
- Gmina: Krzynowłoga Mała

Gadomiec-Jędryki [ɡaˈdɔmjɛt͡s jɛnˈdrɨki] is a village in the administrative district of Gmina Krzynowłoga Mała, within Przasnysz County, Masovian Voivodeship, in east-central Poland.
