= Goski-Wąsosze =

- Village
- Location within Poland
- Coordinates: 53°8′59″N 20°51′1″E
- Country: Poland
- Voivodeship: Masovian
- County: Przasnysz
- Gmina: Krzynowłoga Mała
- Population: 51

Goski-Wąsosze [ˈɡɔski vɔ̃ˈsɔʂɛ] (until 2010 known as Gąski-Wąsosze) is a village in the administrative district of Gmina Krzynowłoga Mała, within Przasnysz County, Masovian Voivodeship, in east-central Poland.
