= Gadomiec-Wyraki =

- Village
- Location within Poland
- Coordinates: 53°11′59″N 20°49′12″E
- Country: Poland
- Voivodeship: Masovian
- County: Przasnysz
- Gmina: Krzynowłoga Mała

Gadomiec-Wyraki [ɡaˈdɔmjɛt͡s vɨˈraki] is a village in the administrative district of Gmina Krzynowłoga Mała, within Przasnysz County, Masovian Voivodeship, in east-central Poland.
