= Nowe Ogrody =

- Settlement
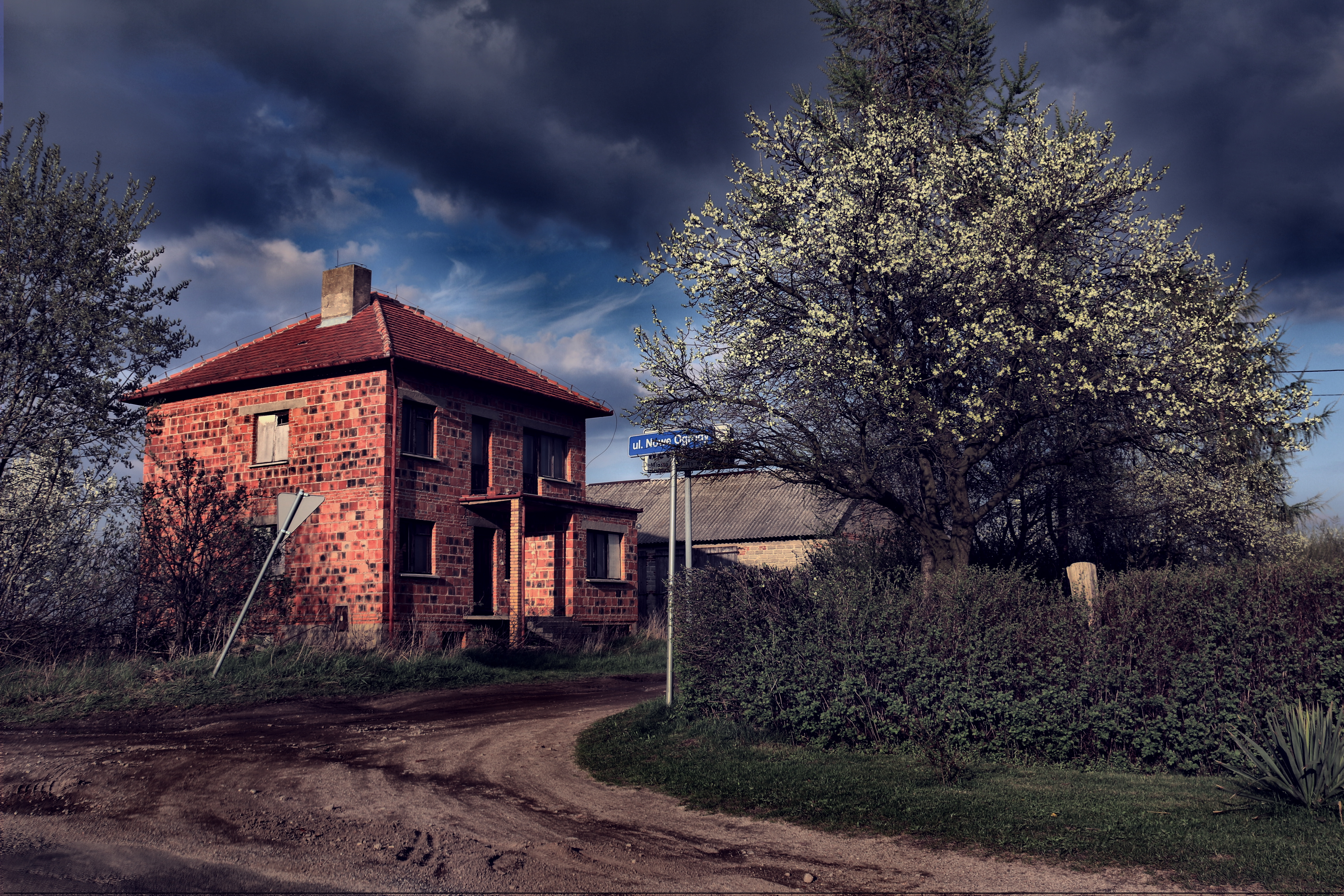
- Manor in Nowe Ogrody

- Location within Poland
- Coordinates: 51°49′36″N 16°18′27″E
- Country: Poland
- Voivodeship: Lubusz
- County: Wschowa
- Gmina: Wschowa

Nowe Ogrody [ˈnɔvɛ ɔˈɡrɔdɨ] (German: Neugrätz) is a settlement in the administrative district of Wschowa, within Wschowa County, Lubusz Voivodeship, in western Poland.
