= Zaroślak, Gdańsk =

Quarter of Śródmieście, Gdańsk

Zaroślak
- Quarter (osiedle)
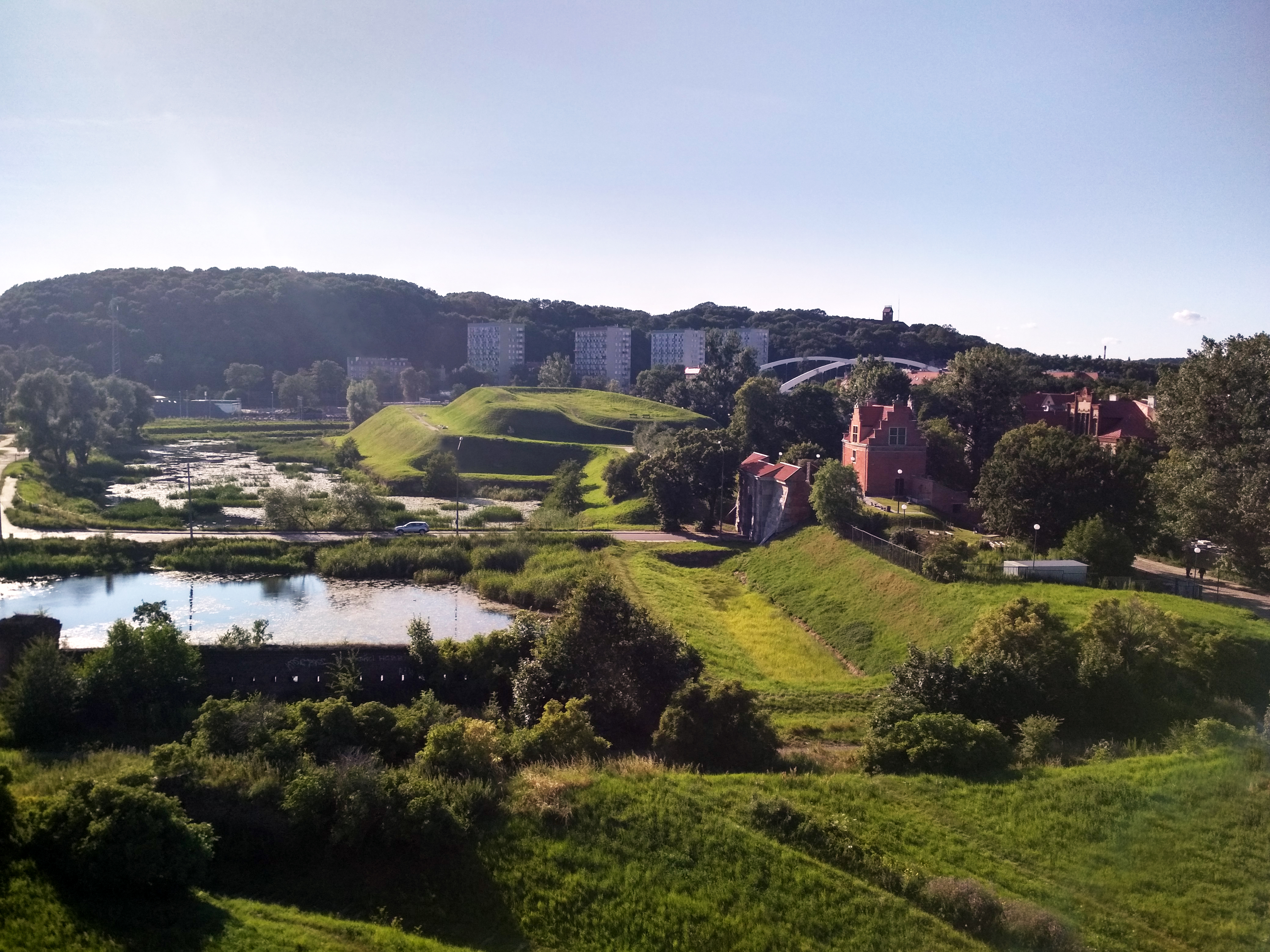
- A bastion, with buildings in the background, 2019

- Zaroślak within Śródmieście
- Interactive map of Zaroślak
- Coordinates: 54.3427°N 18.6378°E
- Country: Poland
- Voivodeship: Pomeranian
- City: Gdańsk
- District: Śródmieście
- Incorporated into Gdańsk: 1656 (partially); 1807 (fully)

Zaroślak (German: Petershagen) is a quarter (osiedle) of Śródmieście, a district of the city of Gdańsk.

== History ==
Zaroślak, known in German as Petershagen, was owned by the Teutonic Order as of 1365. A garden village in the commandery of Danzig (later Gdańsk), in 1656, it was split in two by city fortifications. The part of it within the fortifications, Zaroślak Wewnętrzny (Petershagen innerhalb des Tores), became part of the city that year, whereas the part outside of the fortifications, Zaroślak Zewnętrzny (Petershagen ausserhalb des Tores), only became part of Danzig in 1807.

The Brama Oruńska linked the two sides of Petershagen. In the 19th century, it was one of the poorest areas of Danzig; according to an assessment by the doctor Albert Karl Liévin in 1869, it had the most polluted water in the entirety of the city. The spire of the Church of the Saviour, a church largely destroyed during World War II, has survived to this day, though it is now commonly mislabelled as a fortified tower.

Since the 1960s, a post-war complex of apartment buildings has been present in Zaroślak.
