= Dolne Miasto =

Quarter of Śródmieście, Gdańsk

- Quarter (osiedle)
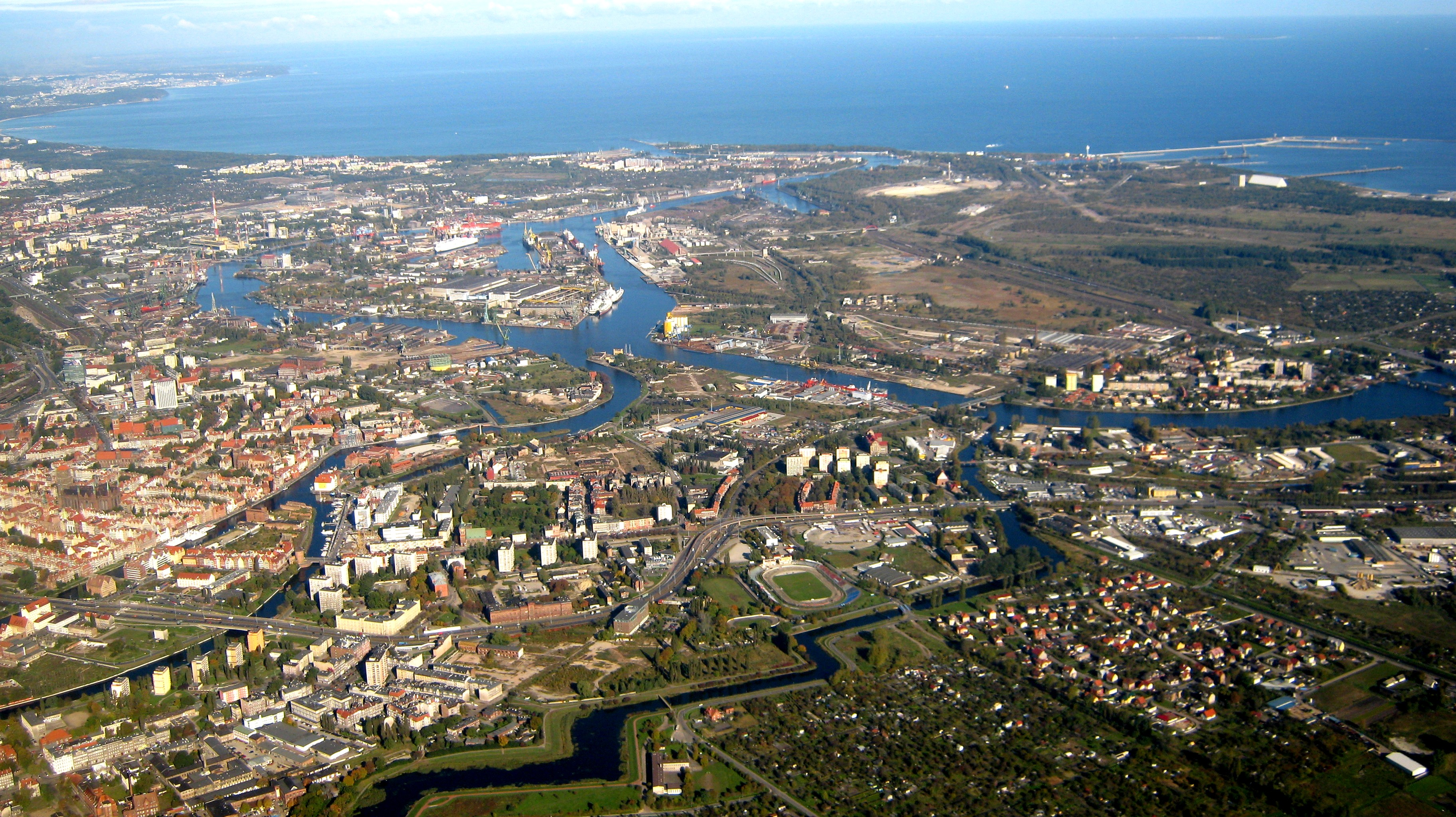
- Aerial view of Dolne Miasto in the bottom left

- Dolne Miasto within Śródmieście
- Interactive map of Dolne Miasto
- Coordinates: 54.3416°N 18.6574°E
- Country: Poland
- Voivodeship: Pomeranian
- City: Gdańsk
- District: Śródmieście
- Incorporated into Gdańsk: 17th century

Dolne Miasto (German: Niederstadt) is a quarter (osiedle) of Śródmieście, a district of the city of Gdańsk.

== History ==
Dolne Miasto was initially covered by flood-meadows and riparian forests and incorporated into the city of Danzig (later Gdańsk) in the 17th century, becoming a garden quarter. During the siege of Danzig in 1734, it proved itself not vulnerable to artillery fire by the besieging forces, resulting in its population significantly increasing.

In the 19th century, the area's population once again increased amid an expansion of industry. Factories of rifles and tobacco products were present, among others. An oil mill was also constructed, and a garrison was operational there from the 19th century to World War II. The quarter was partially destroyed during the siege of Danzig in 1945. It was economically devastated following the creation of a new road, the W-Z Route (Polish: Trasa W-Z), which cut it off from the central parts of the city, causing it to fall into poverty.

In 2014, a series of urban renewal projects began in Dolne Miasto. They included the renovation of townhouses, the revitalization of bastions on the shore of the Opływ Motławy, and the development of areas on the site of a former tram depot.

== Regional heritage locations ==
The following locations in Dolne Miasto have been listed on the regional heritage list:

- Early modern bastions, named Królik, Miś, Wilk, and Wyskok
- Śluza Kamienna, a lock from the 17th century, as well as a nearby mill
- A former manor at ul. Kieturakisa 1
- A wattle-and-daub home from 1800 at ul. Reduta Wyskok 2
- The Church of the Immaculate Annunciation of the Blessed Virgin Mary at ul. Łąkowa 34a
- The former Royal Rifle Factory at ul. Łąkowa 35–38
- A townhouse built in 1880 at ul. Łąkowa 34
- A home built in 1889 at ul. Śluza 2
- A former bathhouse built in 1905 at ul. Jaskółcza 1, 3, and 4a
- The headquarters of the former Danziger Tabak Monopol at ul. Łąkowa 39/40
