= Grodzisko, Gdańsk =

Quarter of Śródmieście, Gdańsk

Grodzisko
- Quarter (osiedle)
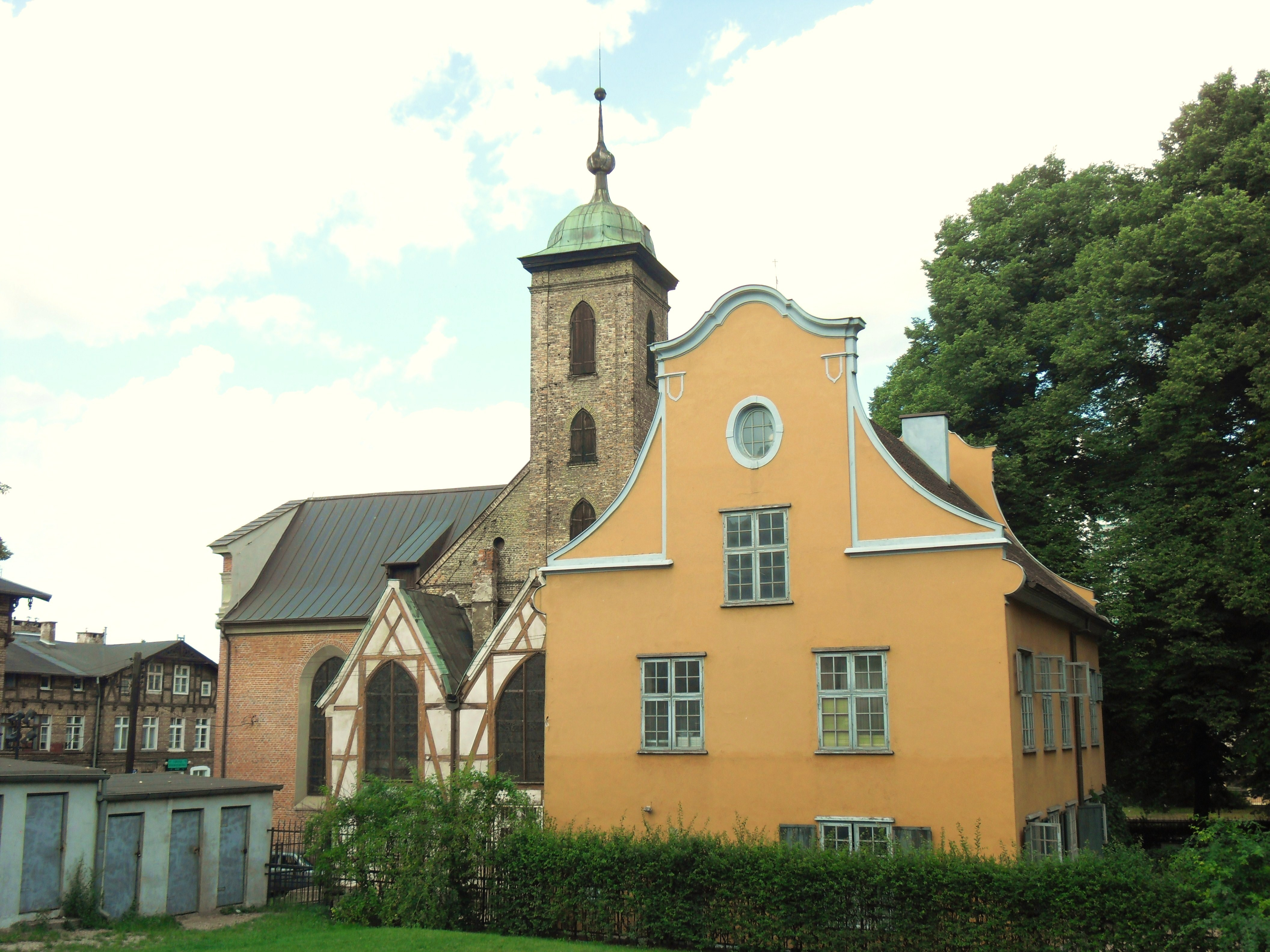
- Historic buildings in Grodzisko

- Grodzisko within Śródmieście
- Interactive map of Grodzisko
- Coordinates: 54.3567°N 18.6404°E
- Country: Poland
- Voivodeship: Pomeranian
- City: Gdańsk
- District: Śródmieście
- Incorporated into Gdańsk: 1454

Grodzisko, historically known as Góra Gradowa (German: Hagelsberg; Kashubian: Gradowô Góra), is a quarter (osiedle) of Śródmieście, a district of Gdańsk.

== History ==
Grodzisko was initially home to a stronghold guarding the city of Gdańsk, a role it served as early as the 9th century. By 1392, it had been further developed with gardens, and became part of Gdańsk in 1454. It was progressively militarized, with an instance of it being used for military purposes being during the Danzig rebellion in 1577. It was also a fort of François Joseph Lefebvre during the siege of Danzig in 1807.

Military use of Grodzisko, known in German as Hagelsberg, continued up to 1973, including as a base for anti-aircraft warfare during World War II. After the war, it was used as a location for military radio broadcasting. In 1973, an initial project for repurposing the area was proposed, with the idea being to create a new Youth Centre of Culture, but this was not realized. Since 1997, Grodzisko has been occupied by a public park, as well as Hevelianum, a museum. The most significant recent addition is the completion of the Cross of Two Millennia of Christianity and a Millennium of Gdańsk in 2000.
