= Main City =

Central part of Gdańsk

- Quarter (osiedle)
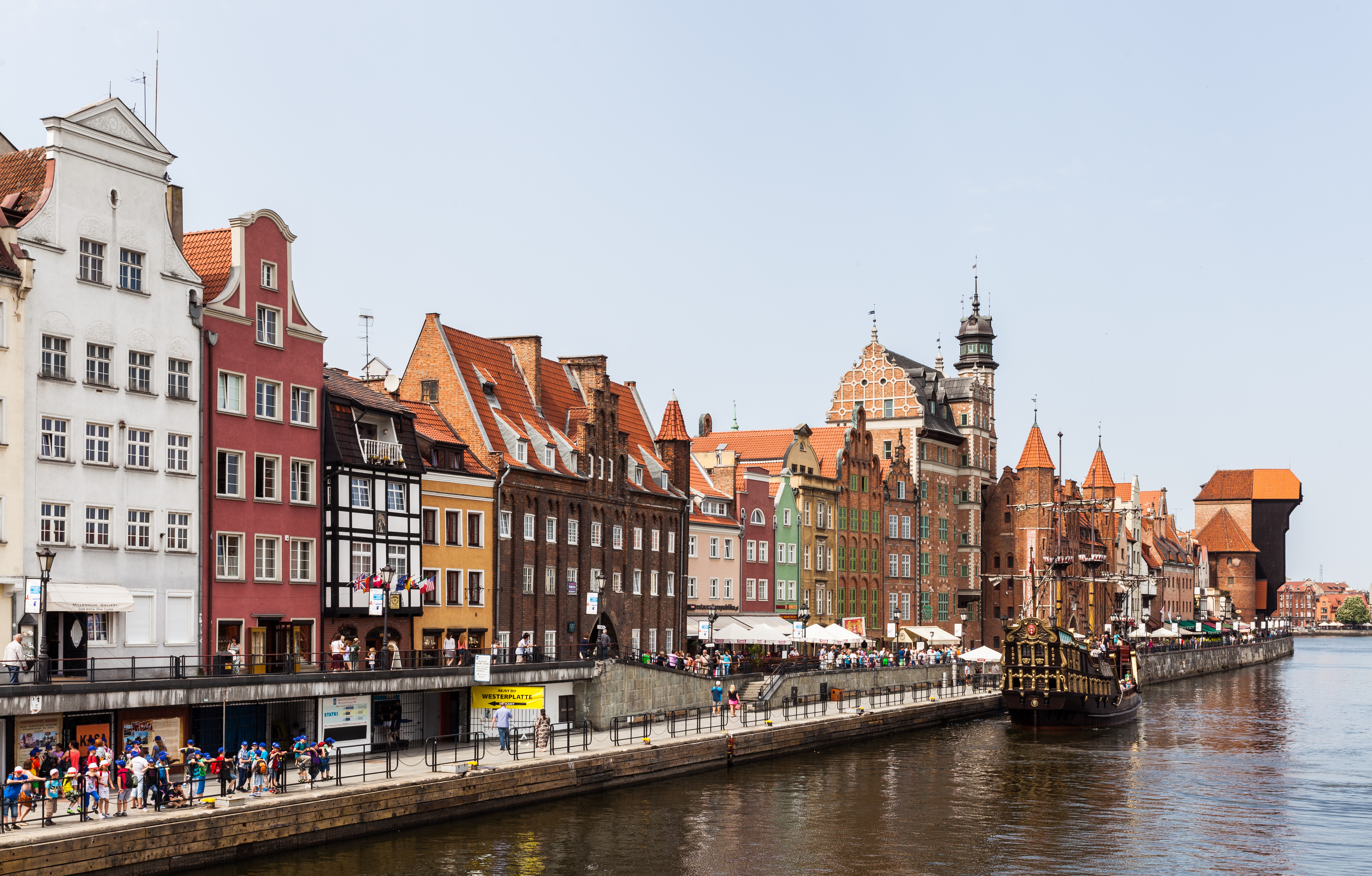
- Main City as seen from across the Motława

- Główne Miasto within Śródmieście
- Interactive map of Main City
- Coordinates: 54.3489°N 18.6529°E
- Country: Poland
- Voivodeship: Pomeranian
- City: Gdańsk
- District: Śródmieście
- Founded: 1343

The Main City (Polish: Główne Miasto, German: Rechtstadt) is the central, historic part of Gdańsk's borough of Śródmieście. Unlike the Old Town, the area was rebuilt after World War II and includes some of the city's best known historical monuments, including the St. Mary's basilica, Golden Gate, Artus Court, Main City Hall, the Royal Road, Long Lane and Long Market.

== Location ==
The Main City is located on the western bank of Motława. It is surrounded by the Old Town to the north, the Stare Przedmieście to the south, the borough of Nowe Ogrody to the east and the Granary Island to the east, across Motława.

== History ==
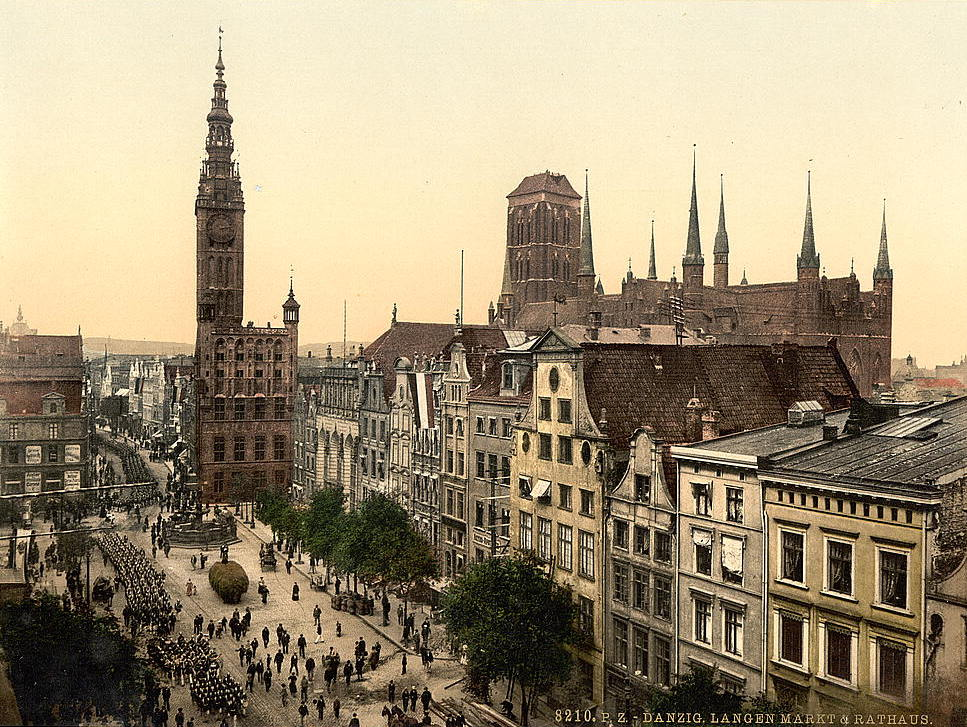
Długi Targ (then usually known by its German name, Langen Markt) in 1890-1900

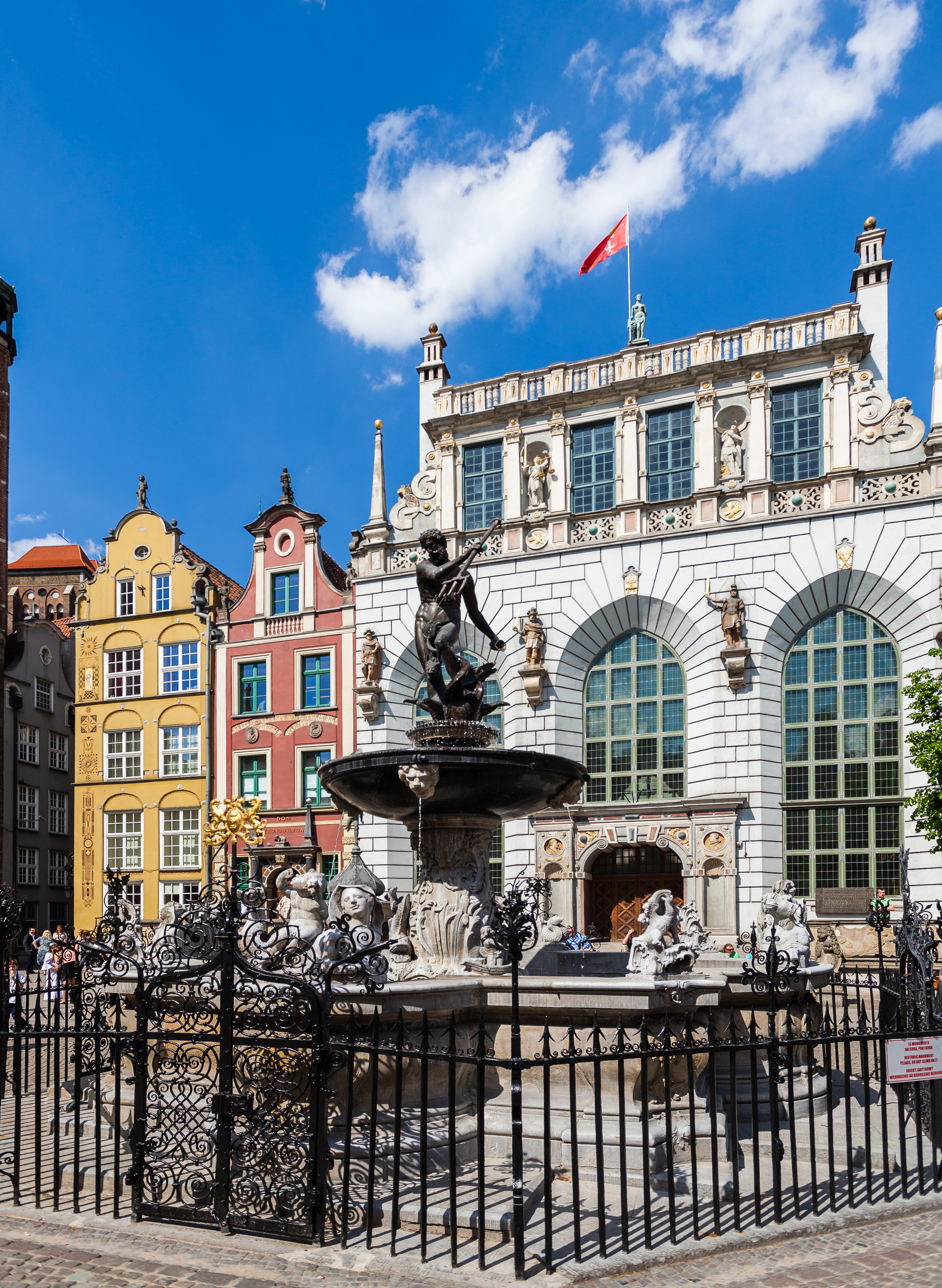
Długi Targ

It was founded in 1343 by the Teutonic Knights who had conquered the area in 1308. Officially a separate settlement from the nearby city (since then called the Old Town), it was chartered with Kulm Law, and was governed separately until 1457, when king Casimir IV of Poland granted the town with the Great Privilege, uniting the Main City with the Old Town and the suburb of Osiek. From then onwards the Main City shared its history with the rest of Gdańsk. In 19th century many houses in the largely mediaeval and renaissance part of Gdańsk received new, Gothic revival façades in line with a trend in Germany tying this style to "German spirit".

During World War II the Main City was often targeted by Allied bombing raids. It received further damage during and immediately after the Siege of Danzig in the spring of 1945. Altogether, approximately 90% of all buildings in the Main City were destroyed. Despite serious opposition to the idea, in 1949 Polish authorities decided to rebuild the Main City, with most of its historical landmarks.

However, instead of reconstructing the city to the way it looked immediately before World War II, various landmarks were restored to historical and quasi-historical forms alluding to their renaissance look, in order to underline the city's ties with Poland, but also to emphasize Gdańsk's rich multi-cultural tradition, with Flemish, Italian and French influences. In addition, Polish architects got rid of the largely mediaeval dense urban fabric and reconstructed mostly the façades along the main streets, while annexes, second and third rows of houses with their courtyards were replaced by larger open spaces, in line with contemporary understanding of urban planning.

== See also ==
- History of Gdańsk
- Warsaw Old Town
