= Sienna Grobla =

Quarter of Śródmieście, Gdańsk

- Quarter (osiedle)
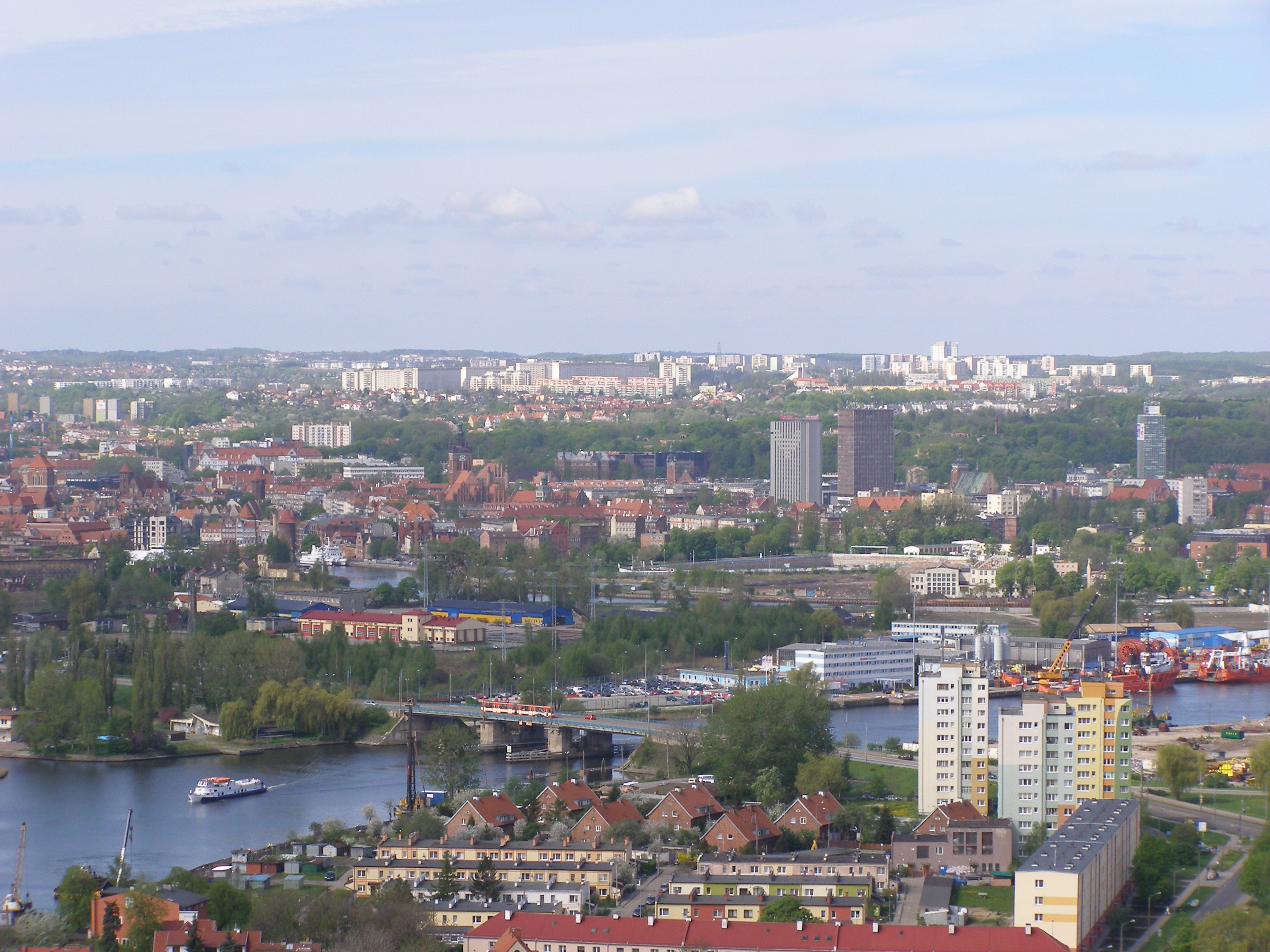
- Gdańsk, with Sienna Grobla in the foreground

- Sienna Grobla within Śródmieście
- Interactive map of Sienna Grobla
- Coordinates: 54.3543°N 18.6755°E
- Country: Poland
- Voivodeship: Pomeranian
- City: Gdańsk
- District: Śródmieście
- Incorporated into Gdańsk: 1814

Sienna Grobla (German: Strohdeich) is a quarter (osiedle) and eponymous road of Śródmieście, a district of Gdańsk.

== History ==
Initially, Sienna Grobla was found on the riverbed of the Vistula, eventually drying to become floodplain meadows in the 16th and 17th centuries, becoming part of the city of Gdańsk in 1814. It was part of the city's fortifications, with infrastructure including a blockhouse built in the 18th century. The Polski Hak is a significant feature of Sienna Grobla, located at the mouth of the Motława; starting in 1856, it was the location of a shipyard, and slowly grew to encompass further light industry.

Recently, modern developments have become more common in Sienna Grobla, although the local government has made efforts to protect the historic buildings in the quarter.
