= Rudno Jeziorowe =

- Village
- Location within Poland
- Coordinates: 53°8′N 20°46′E
- Country: Poland
- Voivodeship: Masovian
- County: Przasnysz
- Gmina: Krzynowłoga Mała

Rudno Jeziorowe [ˈrudnɔ jɛʑɔˈrɔvɛ] is a village in the administrative district of Gmina Krzynowłoga Mała, within Przasnysz County, Masovian Voivodeship, in east-central Poland.
