= Rudno, Russia =

Rudno (Russian: Рудно) is the name of several rural localities in Russia:

- Rudno, Leningrad Oblast, a village in Novoselskoye Settlement Municipal Formation of Slantsevsky District of Leningrad Oblast
- Rudno, Pskov Oblast, a village in Plyussky District of Pskov Oblast
