= Śródmieście, Gdańsk =

Śródmieście
- District (dzielnica)
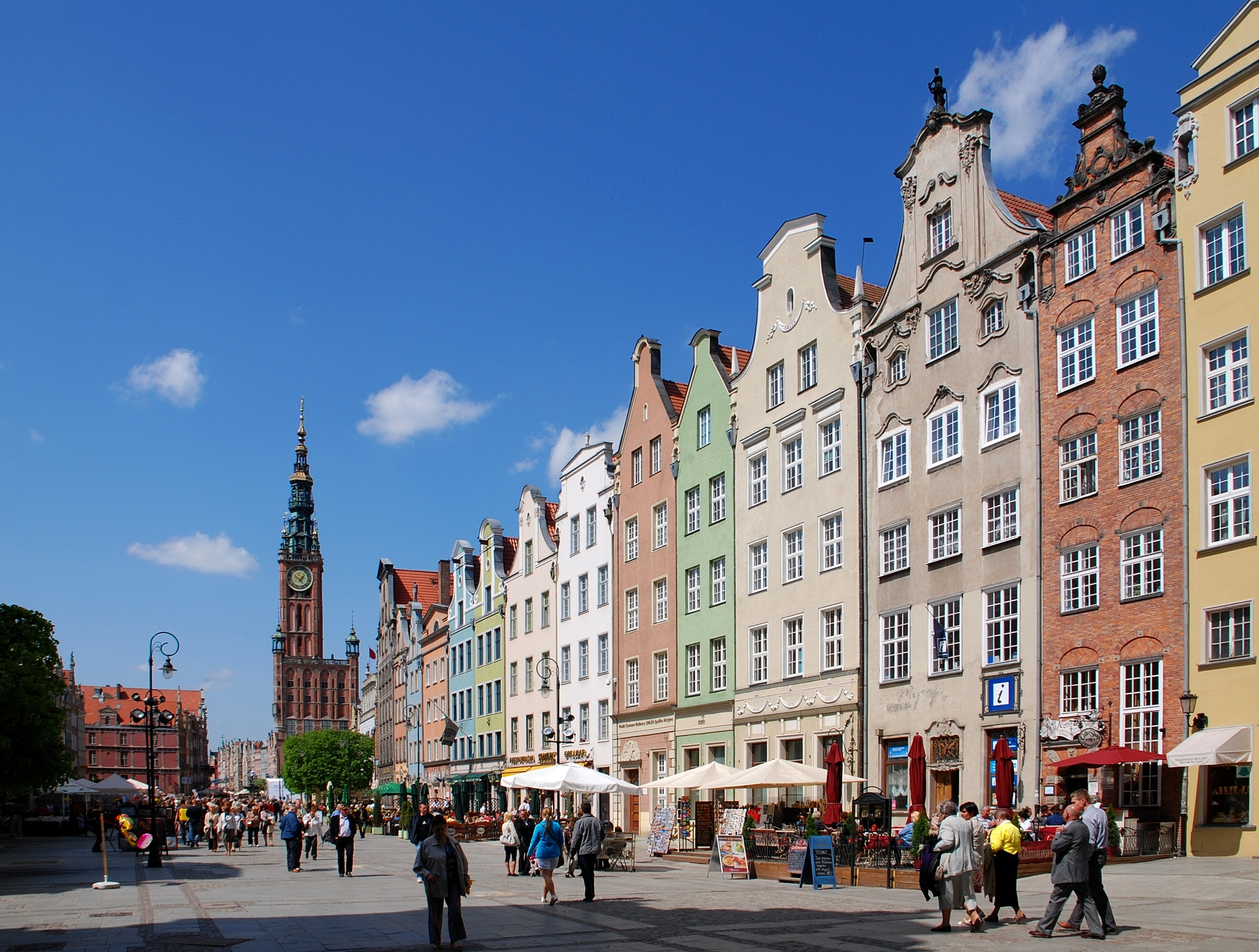
- View of Długi Targ and Gdańsk Town Hall

- Location of Śródmieście within Gdańsk
- Coordinates: 54°20′54″N 18°39′24″E
- Country: Poland
- Voivodeship: Pomeranian
- County/City: Gdańsk

Area
  - Total: 5.65 km^{2} (2.18 sq mi)

Population (2015)
  - Total: 29,630
  - Density: 5,240/km^{2} (13,600/sq mi)
- Time zone: UTC+1 (CET)
  - Summer (DST): UTC+2 (CEST)
- Postal code: 80-500
- Area code: +48 58
- Vehicle registration: GD

Śródmieście ([ɕrudˈmjɛɕt͡ɕɛ]; 'city centre'; Kashubian: Westrzódgardzé) is a district (dzielnica) of the city of Gdańsk, Poland. It is the traditional city centre of Gdańsk.

== Location ==
Śródmieście is located in the central-eastern part of Gdańsk, on the Motława. To its northeast, it borders the Przeróbka on Port Island, found across the Martwa Wisła River. To its south and east, it is bordered by the Opływ Motławy. Across this body of water, the districts of Rudniki, Olszynka and Orunia-Św. Wojciech-Lipce are found. To the south-west, it borders Chełm, and to the west, it borders Siedlce. Śródmieście borders Aniołki and Młyniska to its north.

== History ==
Śródmieście, being a modern administrative division comprising the borders of Gdańsk up to the year 1807, shares the entirety of its history with either the city of Gdańsk up to that year or with its quarters, listed below.

== Subdivisions (osiedla) ==
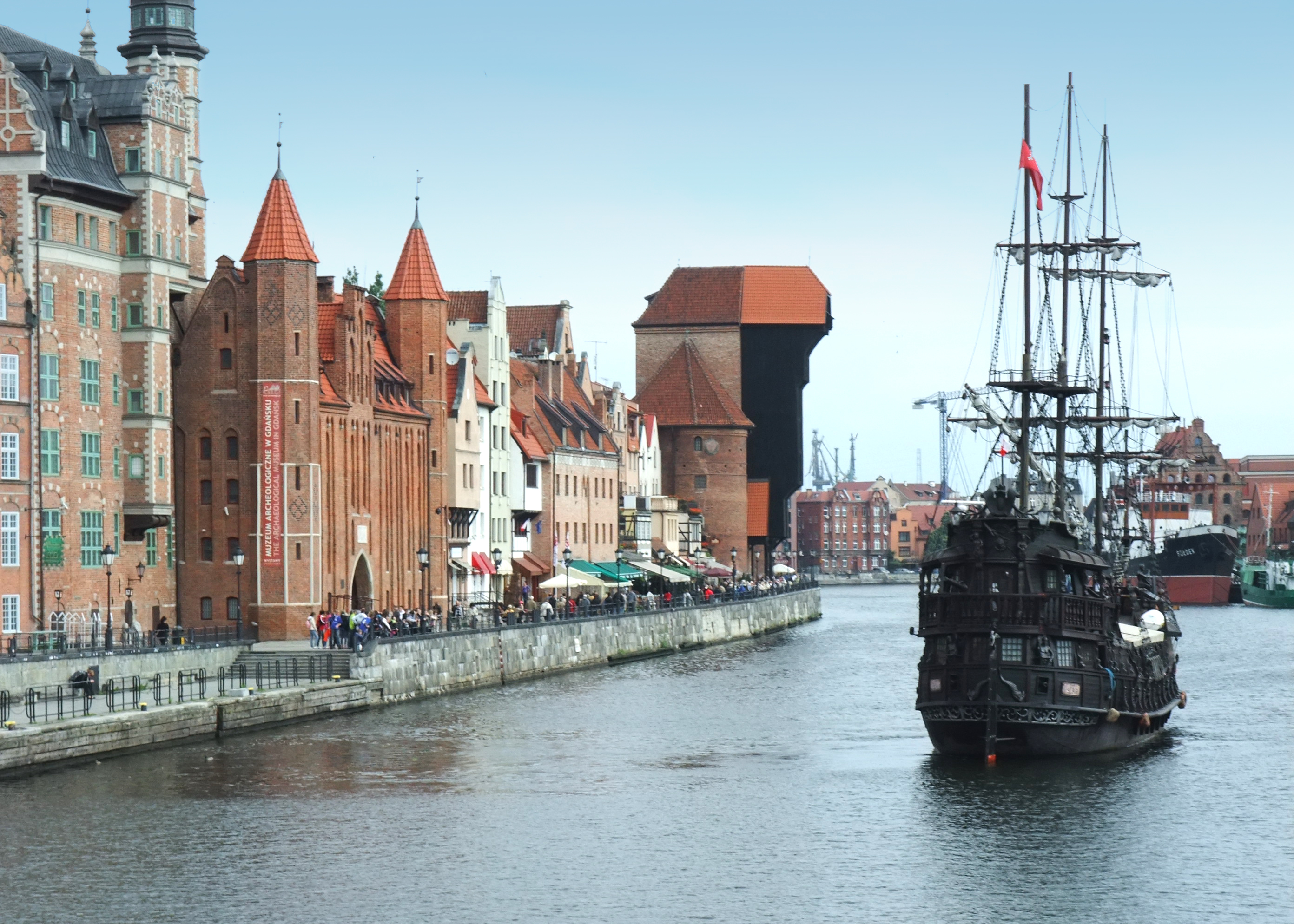
Długie Pobrzeże and Motława river

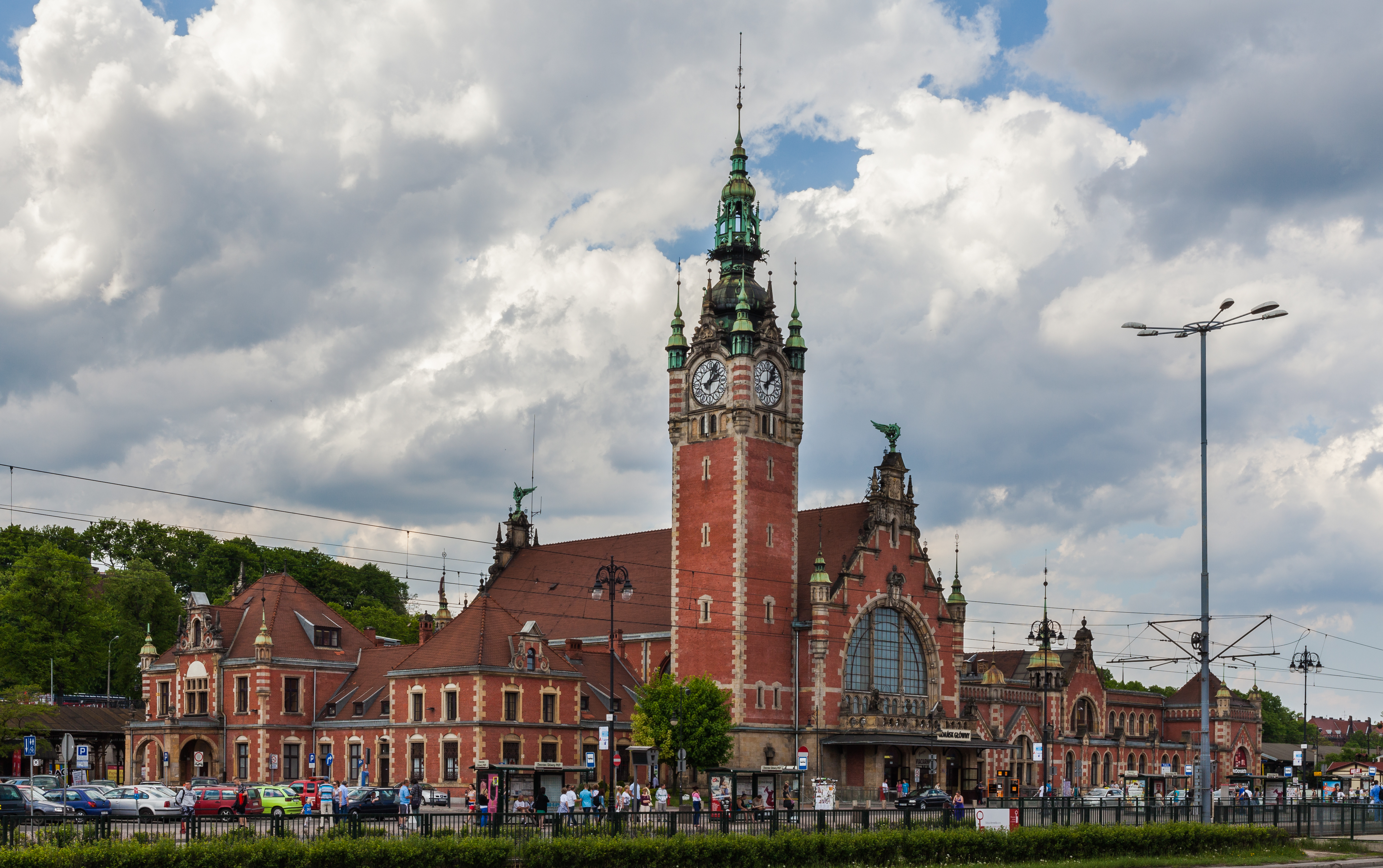
Gdańsk Główny railway station

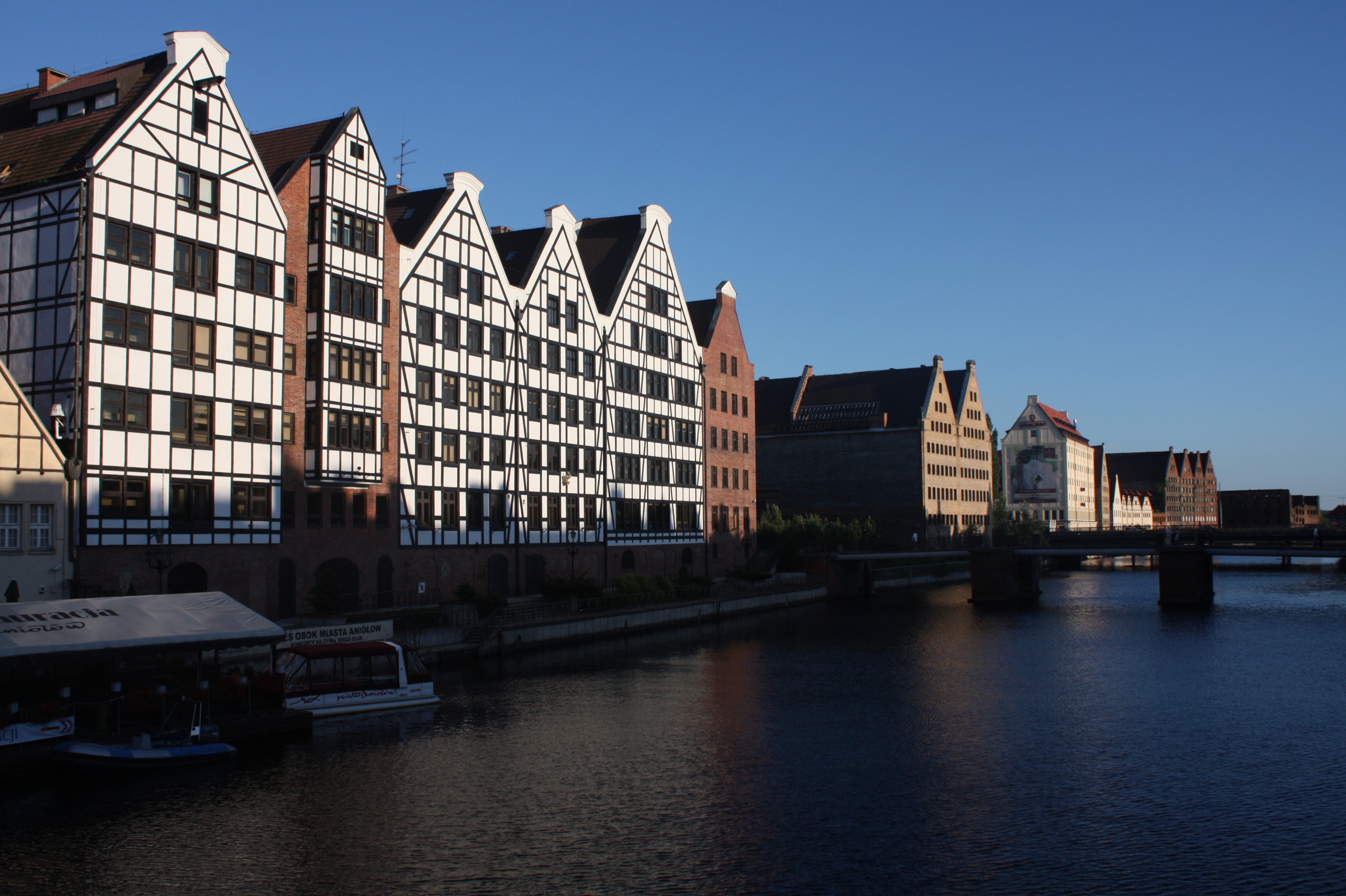
Wyspa Spichrzów granaries

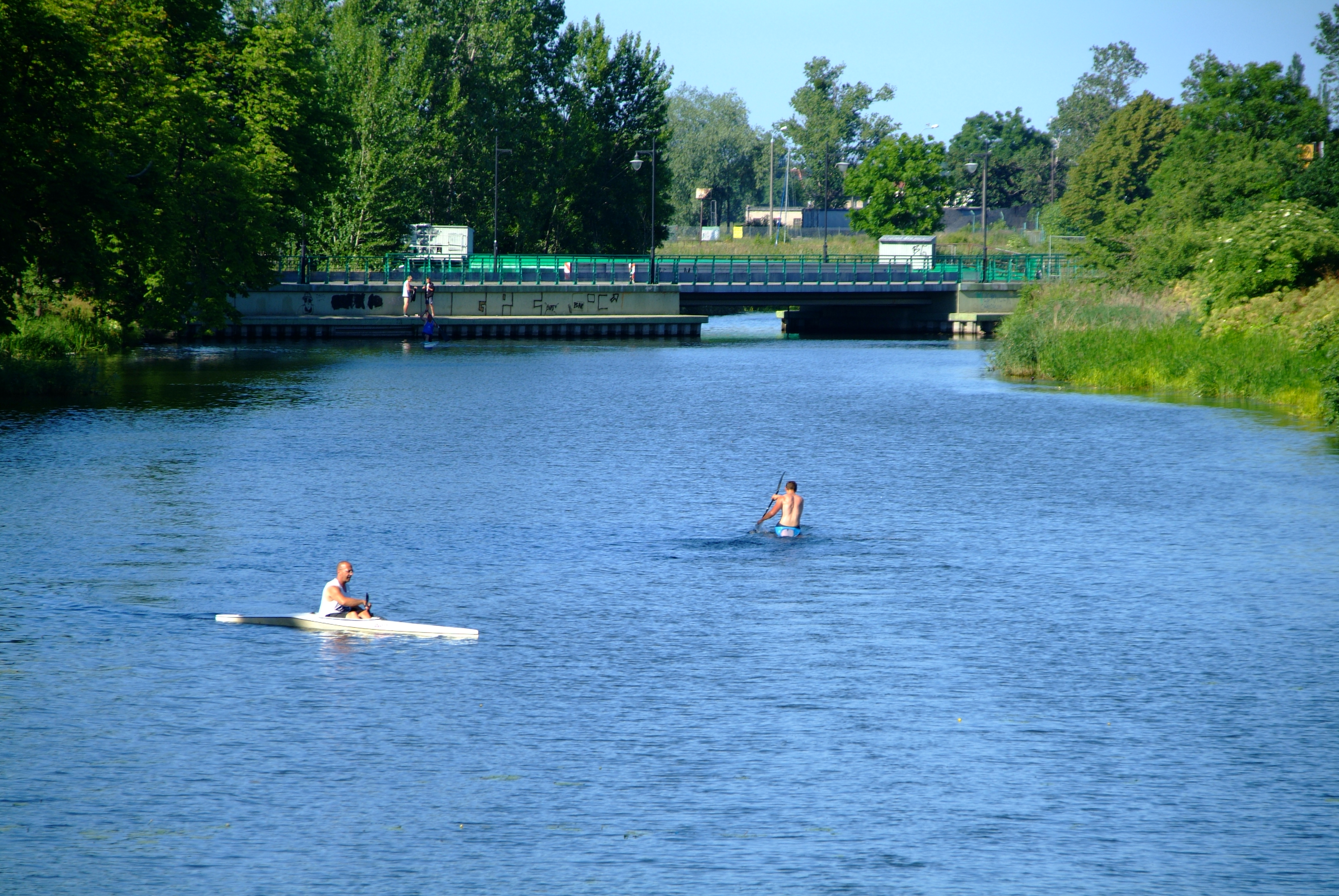
Na Stepcę Canal

Śródmieście comprises the following quarters (osiedla):

Division	Short description	Location in Śródmieście
Główne Miasto	The historic centre of Gdańsk. Between the 10th and 13th centuries, it was a fortified port and was granted city rights in 1343.
Stare Miasto	The oldest area of Gdańsk, dating back to the ninth century.
Stare Przedmieście	An unfortified subdivision of Główne Miasto. Occupied by gardens and shipyards starting in the 1340s.
Wyspa Spichrzów	First built up in 1330.
Długie Ogrody	A historically undefended quarter formerly consisting of rental gardens.
Ołowianka	An island on the Motława.
Dolne Miasto	Historically a garden quarter.
Nowe Ogrody	Also historically occupied by gardens; St. Gertrude's Church is present, having been built in 1342.
Grodzisko	The site of a defensive gord built in the ninth and tenth centuries, as well as city fortifications built in 1656 and expanded in 1807.
Biskupia Górka	Former property of the Bishops of Włocławek. Location of city fortifications built in the seventeenth century.
Zaroślak	A settlement dating back to 1365.
Sienna Grobla	A blockhouse has been a feature of the Polski Hak, located in Sienna Grobla, since the eighteenth century.
Rudno	Part of Długie Ogrody, built up in the fifteenth and sixteenth centuries.

== Transport ==
The Gdańsk Główny and Gdańsk Śródmieście railway stations are located within the district, with the former being the second busiest railway station in the Tricity and ninth busiest station in Poland (as of 2021).
