= Drążdżewo Nowe =

- Village
- Location within Poland
- Coordinates: 53°8′N 21°6′E
- Country: Poland
- Voivodeship: Masovian
- County: Przasnysz
- Gmina: Jednorożec
- Website: http://www.jednorozec.pl/

Drążdżewo Nowe [drɔ̃ʐˈd͡ʐɛvɔ ˈnɔvɛ] is a village in the administrative district of Gmina Jednorożec, within Przasnysz County, Masovian Voivodeship, in east-central Poland.

== History ==
Drążdżewo Nowe (New Drążdżewo or New Brushwood) was a privately owned settlement already existing in 1386. However, the site already had previously contained a number of small villages, but only Drążdżewo Nowe (New Drążdżewo) now survives.

The word drążdżewo is derived from the word drzążdż (Proto-Slavonic dręzga), meaning brushwood. The settlement, at times, has also been known as Draszewo and, later, also as Drasdzew, Drzanzewo, and Drzązewo.

A post-World War I census, taken in 1921, recorded 25 homes and 145 inhabitants living in the village.

The village is incorporated under the municipality of Gmina Jednorożec, which was established in 1867.

== See also ==
- Gmina Jednorożec
- Jednorożec
