= Dynak =

- Village
- Location within Poland
- Coordinates: 53°13′N 21°10′E
- Country: Poland
- Voivodeship: Masovian
- County: Przasnysz
- Gmina: Jednorożec
- Website: http://www.jednorozec.pl/

Dynak [ˈdɨnak] is a village in the administrative district of Gmina Jednorożec, within Przasnysz County, Masovian Voivodeship, in east-central Poland.

== History ==
Dynak is a hamlet first listed in the census of towns, settlements and villages of the Polish Kingdom in 1827. It consisted of six houses and 31 inhabitants who raised sheep. The hamlet name Dynak was derived from the name Dionizy (Dionysius).

Nineteenth-century Polish maps show the village as belonging to the parish of Baranowo, and in 1867 it became administered by the Jednorożec municipality Gmina Jednorożec.

The post-World War I census, taken in 1921, showed the settlement consisted of 22 homes and 106 inhabitants.

== See also ==
- Gmina Jednorożec
- Jednorożec
