= Stanisław Chełchowski =

Polish botanist (1866–1907)

Stanisław Chełchowski

Stanisław Chełchowski (February 27, 1866, in Chojnowo near Przasnysz – March 23, 1907, in Ciechanów) was a Polish naturalist (botanist and mycologist), ethnographer and activist (social, educational and political). Founder and activist of various educational and agricultural organizations, author of many works from areas of mycology, agriculture and ethnography.

== Biography ==
Stanisław Chełchowski was born on February 26, 1866, in Chojnowo near Przasnysz into a Polish nobility family. He studied in Mława and Warsaw; in his schools he was a member of various secret Polish educational societies, and headed a secret library of Polish literature (prohibited by the partitioners). Since he was 14 years old, he started writing, and his description of his home villages was published in Dictionary of Polish Geography, a magazine published by Polish geographer, Filip Sulimierski. In 1887 he graduated, with a Golden Medal, from Physics and Nature Department of the Warsaw University; his dissertation was in the field of mycology.

Over the next years he continued his research, particularly concentrating on the ethnography of Masovia region and the Kurpie folk. He published several ethnographic works in the 1880s; among his most famous work is Folk tales and stories from Przasnysz (Powieści i opowiadania ludowe z okolic Przasnysza) from 1889 to 1890, collecting 86 local folk tales written in local dialect. He also gained fame as a mycologist, having discovered several species of mushroom and authoring the first Polish atlas of mushrooms. He also published several works related to agriculture in the 1890s, particularly after he took over his father's farm in 1891 (the same year he got married). He helped organize and publish results on the survey of agricultural plants diseases. He sponsored the creation of the first Polish academic journal in the field of agriculture, Rocznik Nauk Rolniczych.

In 1899 he declined an offer to teach agriculture at the Jagiellonian University, stating that he preferred to work in Congress Poland (then Kraków, where the university was located in Austro-Hungary) and at the same time, Russian government which controlled Privislinsky Krai gave permission for locals to create and take part in agricultural societies. Chełchowski became involved in activities of several of them and in the 1900s he was an activist in various organizations related to education and agriculture, the most prominent of which included Museum of Industry and Agriculture in Warsaw, Polska Macierz Szkolna and Flying University. Founder and chairman of Centralne Towarzystwo Rolnicze (1907).

He was also active on a political scene. He was a deputy to Russian Duma from Płock Governorate (in 1906), and he became an activist and supporter of endecja faction. He was also a friend of Polish politician Roman Dmowski.

Stanisław Chełchowski died in Ciechanów on March 23, 1907, on his way to Płock meeting of local Nature Society, where he was to give a lecture. He was buried in the village that was his residence for many years, Czernice Borowe.
