= Krzynowłoga =

Krzynowłoga may refer to:

- Krzynowłoga Mała - Village in Masovian Voivodeship, in Gmina Krzynowłoga Mała, Poland
- Krzynowłoga Wielka - Village in Masovian Voivodeship, in Gmina Chorzele, Poland
