= Stegna, Przasnysz County =

Stegna
- Village
- Location within Poland
- Coordinates: 53°08′13″N 21°02′50″E
- Country: Poland
- Voivodeship: Masovian
- County: Przasnysz
- Gmina: Jednorożec
- Website: http://www.jednorozec.pl/

Stegna [ˈstɛɡna] is a village in the administrative district of Gmina Jednorożec, within Przasnysz County, Masovian Voivodeship, in east-central Poland.

== History ==
Stegna was a village by the Orzyc River initially settled in the early nineteenth century on the estate of Kazimierz Krasiński. It remained part of the Krasiński and Wawrzyńca estate until late in the nineteenth century.

In 1827 the settlement had 81 residents, and, by the middle of the nineteenth center, the village contained a dozen homes. By the late nineteenth century, the village counted 18 homes, 153 residents, on 260 land measures (mórg).

During the fighting of World War I, Stegna lay on the front line of battle from the spring of 1915 to July 1915, and much of the village was destroyed. Postwar inhabitants rebuilt the village, and, a census taken post-war, in 1921, counted 28 homes and 156 inhabitants, including three Jews.

The village is incorporated under the municipality of Gmina Jednorożec, which was established in 1867.

== See also ==
- Krasnosielc
- Gmina Jednorożec
- Jednorożec
