= Obórki, Przasnysz County =

Obórki
- Village
- Location within Poland
- Coordinates: 53°6′N 21°1′E
- Country: Poland
- Voivodeship: Masovian
- County: Przasnysz
- Gmina: Jednorożec
- Website: http://www.jednorozec.pl/

Obórki [ɔˈburki] is a village in the administrative district of Gmina Jednorożec, within Przasnysz County, Masovian Voivodeship, in east-central Poland.

== History ==
The hamlet of Obórki was founded in the early part of the nineteenth century, about the same time as the nearby hamlet of Nakieł.

A census in 1888 indicated that the village now had eight homes and 46 inhabitants occupying 76 hectares of land.

The post-World War I census, taken in 1921, recorded that the village now contained nine homes but still only 46 inhabitants.

The village is incorporated under the municipality of Gmina Jednorożec, which was established in 1867.
