= Żelazna Prywatna =

- Village
- Location within Poland
- Coordinates: 53°13′44″N 21°8′39″E
- Country: Poland
- Voivodeship: Masovian
- County: Przasnysz
- Gmina: Jednorożec
- Population: 150

Żelazna Prywatna [ʐɛˈlazna prɨˈvatna] is a village in the administrative district of Gmina Jednorożec, within Przasnysz County, Masovian Voivodeship, in east-central Poland.
