= Krukowo, Masovian Voivodeship =

Krukowo
- Village
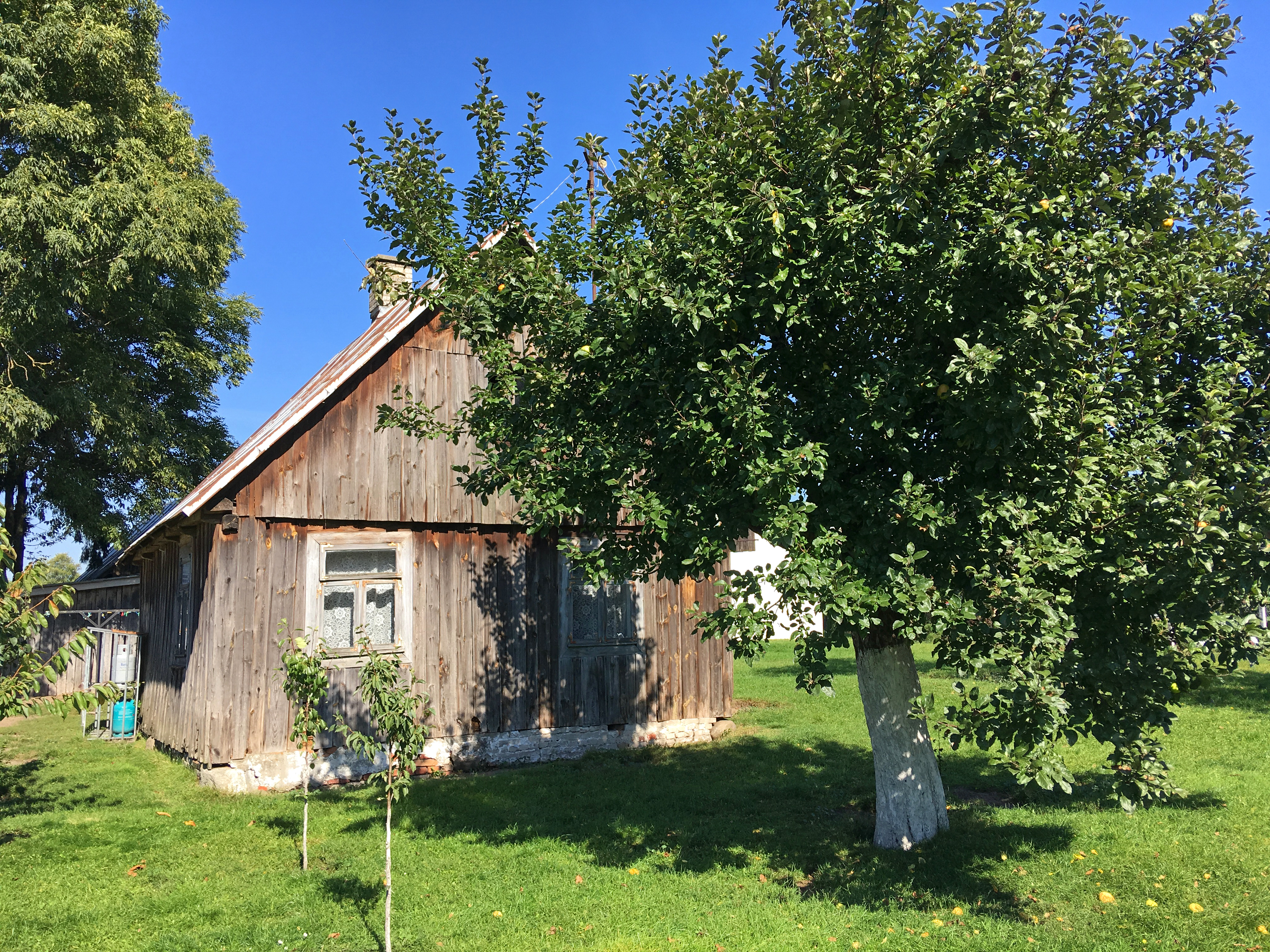

- Location within Poland
- Coordinates: 53°18′N 21°6′E
- Country: Poland
- Voivodeship: Masovian
- County: Przasnysz
- Gmina: Chorzele
- Time zone: UTC+1 (CET)
  - Summer (DST): UTC+2 (CEST)

Krukowo [kruˈkɔvɔ] is a village in the administrative district of Gmina Chorzele, within Przasnysz County, Masovian Voivodeship, in east-central Poland.

Five Polish citizens were murdered by Nazi Germany in the village during World War II.
