= Małowidz =

- Village
- Location within Poland
- Coordinates: 53°13′N 21°1′E
- Country: Poland
- Voivodeship: Masovian
- County: Przasnysz
- Gmina: Jednorożec
- Elevation: 122 m (400 ft)
- Website: www.jednorozec.pl

Małowidz [maˈwɔvit͡s] is a village in the administrative district of Gmina Jednorożec, within Przasnysz County, Masovian Voivodeship, in east-central Poland.

== History ==
Małowidz was founded as a royal village about the year 1540. Because of lack of money in the royal treasury, the village was leased to nobles (szlachta) in 1605.

In 1781 there were 20 homes in the village, and, because of good government practices established in 1795, the population increased to 34 homes and 228 inhabitants by 1827. By 1885, when the village was a part of Gmina Jednorożec, the census indicated 48 homes and 299 inhabitants on 1,326 hectares of land and 397 hectares of uncultivated land. After World War I, a census in 1921 indicated the village contained 69 homes and 332 inhabitants.

Between World War I and World War II, the village contained two grocery stores, operated by R. Nagiela and H. Niszanowicza.

A sculpture of folk hero Saint John of Nepomuk is located roadside in the village.

== See also ==
- Gmina Jednorożec
- Jednorożec
