= Olszewka, Przasnysz County =

Olszewka
- Village
- Sacred Heart church in Olszewka

- Location within Poland
- Coordinates: 53°13′N 21°3′E
- Country: Poland
- Voivodeship: Masovian
- County: Przasnysz
- Gmina: Jednorożec
- Time zone: UTC+1 (CET)
  - Summer (DST): UTC+2 (CEST)
- Vehicle registration: WPZ

Olszewka [ɔlˈʂɛfka] is a village in the administrative district of Gmina Jednorożec, within Przasnysz County, Masovian Voivodeship, in north-central Poland.

== History ==
Two Polish citizens were murdered by Nazi Germany in the village during World War II.
