= Bugzy Płoskie =

- Village
- Location within Poland
- Coordinates: 53°16′N 20°47′E
- Country: Poland
- Voivodeship: Masovian
- County: Przasnysz
- Gmina: Chorzele

Bugzy Płoskie (Polish pronunciation: [ˈbuɡzɨ ˈpwɔskʲɛ]) is a village in the administrative district of Gmina Chorzele, within Przasnysz County, Masovian Voivodeship, in east-central Poland.
