= Wasiły-Zygny =

- Village
- Location within Poland
- Coordinates: 53°18′14″N 20°48′22″E
- Country: Poland
- Voivodeship: Masovian
- County: Przasnysz
- Gmina: Chorzele

Wasiły-Zygny [vaˈɕiwɨ ˈzɨɡnɨ] is a village in the administrative district of Gmina Chorzele, within Przasnysz County, Masovian Voivodeship, in east-central Poland.
