= Stara Wieś, Przasnysz County =

Stara Wieś
- Village
- Location within Poland
- Coordinates: 53°16′N 20°45′E
- Country: Poland
- Voivodeship: Masovian
- County: Przasnysz
- Gmina: Chorzele

Stara Wieś [ˈstara ˈvjɛɕ] is a village in the administrative district of Gmina Chorzele, within Przasnysz County, Masovian Voivodeship, located on east-central Poland.
