= Załogi =

- Village
- Location within Poland
- Coordinates: 52°59′18″N 20°47′13″E
- Country: Poland
- Voivodeship: Masovian
- County: Przasnysz
- Gmina: Czernice Borowe

Załogi (Polish pronunciation: [zaˈwɔɡi]) is a village in the administrative district of Gmina Czernice Borowe, within Przasnysz County, Masovian Voivodeship, in east-central Poland.
