= Bugzy-Jarki =

- Village
- Location within Poland
- Coordinates: 53°15′49″N 20°46′24″E
- Country: Poland
- Voivodeship: Masovian
- County: Przasnysz
- Gmina: Chorzele

Bugzy-Jarki (Polish pronunciation: [ˈbuɡzɨ ˈjarkʲi]) is a village in the administrative district of Gmina Chorzele, within Przasnysz County, Masovian Voivodeship, in east-central Poland.
