= Opiłki Płoskie =

- Village
- Location within Poland
- Coordinates: 53°14′42″N 20°43′58″E
- Country: Poland
- Voivodeship: Masovian
- County: Przasnysz
- Gmina: Chorzele
- Population: 40

Opiłki Płoskie [ɔˈpiu̯ki ˈpwɔskʲɛ] is a village in the administrative district of Gmina Chorzele, within Przasnysz County, Masovian Voivodeship, in east-central Poland.
