= Olszewiec =

Olszewiec may refer to the following places in Poland:

- Olszewiec, Masovian Voivodeship (east-central Poland)
- Olszewiec, Pomeranian Voivodeship (north Poland)
