= Binduga, Przasnysz County =

Binduga
- Village
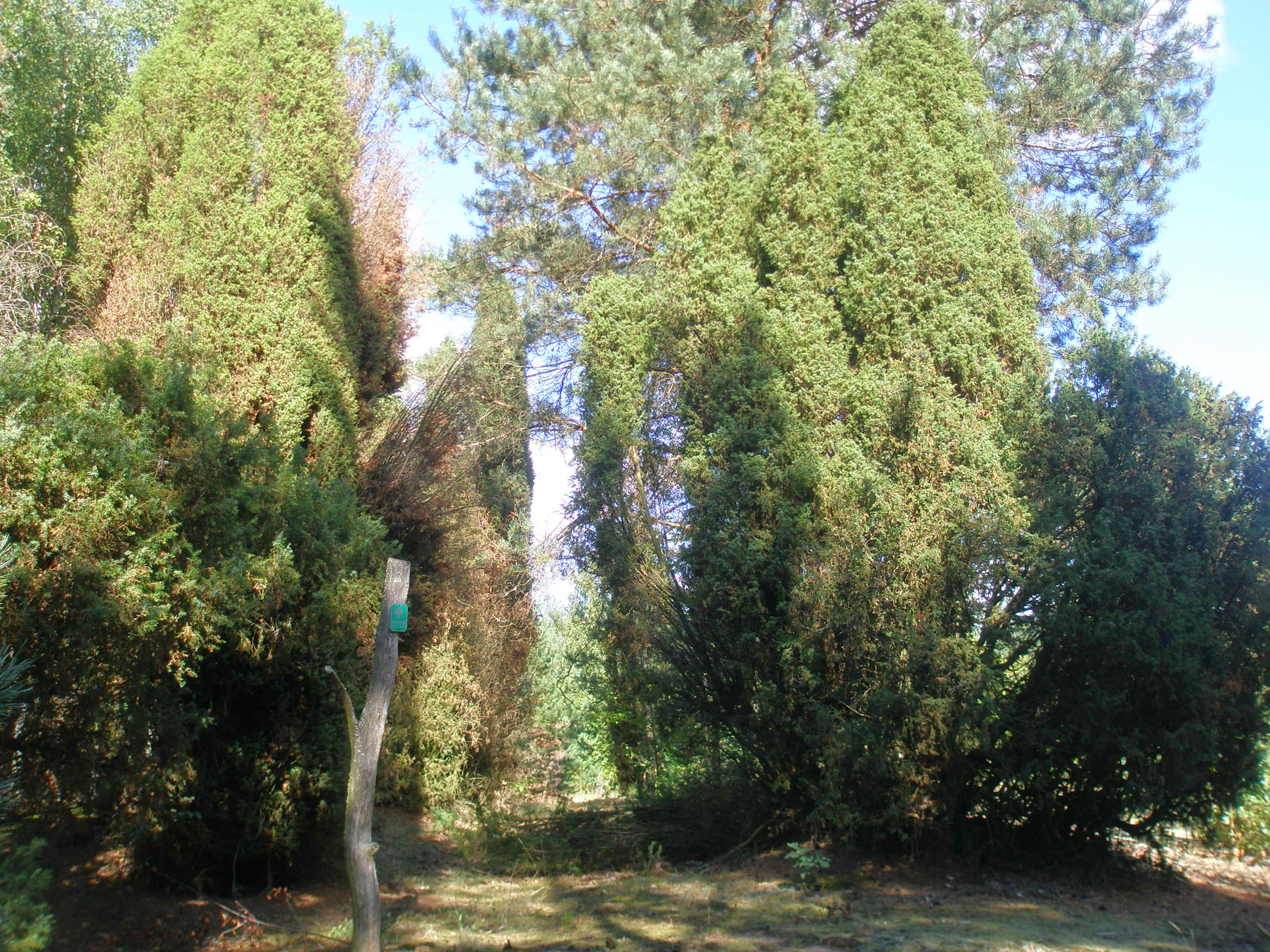

- Location within Poland
- Coordinates: 53°18′13″N 21°08′07″E
- Country: Poland
- Voivodeship: Masovian
- County: Przasnysz
- Gmina: Chorzele

Binduga [binˈduɡa] is a village in the administrative district of Gmina Chorzele, within Przasnysz County, Masovian Voivodeship, in east-central Poland.
