= Szczepanki, Przasnysz County =

Szczepanki
- Village
- Location within Poland
- Coordinates: 52°59′N 20°45′E
- Country: Poland
- Voivodeship: Masovian
- County: Przasnysz
- Gmina: Czernice Borowe

Szczepanki [ʂt͡ʂɛˈpaŋki] is a village in the administrative district of Gmina Czernice Borowe, within Przasnysz County, Masovian Voivodeship, in east-central Poland.
