= Duczymin =

- Village
- Location within Poland
- Coordinates: 53°15′N 20°48′E
- Country: Poland
- Voivodeship: Masovian
- County: Przasnysz
- Gmina: Chorzele

Duczymin [duˈt͡ʂɨmin] is a village in the administrative district of Gmina Chorzele, within Przasnysz County, Masovian Voivodeship, in east-central Poland.
