= Czarzaste Małe =

Village in Gmina Chorzele, Poland

- Village
- Location within Poland
- Coordinates: 53°13′56″N 20°48′20″E
- Country: Poland
- Voivodeship: Masovian
- County: Przasnysz
- Gmina: Chorzele

Czarzaste Małe [t͡ʂaˈʐastɛ ˈmawɛ] is a village in the administrative district of Gmina Chorzele, within Przasnysz County, Masovian Voivodeship, in east-central Poland.
