= Kobylaki-Korysze =

- Village
- Location within Poland
- Coordinates: 53°07′57″N 20°55′10″E
- Country: Poland
- Voivodeship: Masovian
- County: Przasnysz
- Gmina: Jednorożec

Kobylaki-Korysze [kɔbɨˈlaki kɔˈrɨʂɛ] is a village in the administrative district of Gmina Jednorożec, within Przasnysz County, Masovian Voivodeship, in east-central Poland.
