= Annowo, Masovian Voivodeship =

Annowo
- Village
- Location within Poland
- Coordinates: 53°16′7″N 20°48′7″E
- Country: Poland
- Voivodeship: Masovian
- County: Przasnysz
- Gmina: Chorzele

Annowo [anˈnɔvɔ] is a village in the administrative district of Gmina Chorzele, within Przasnysz County, Masovian Voivodeship, in east-central Poland.
