= Łazy, Przasnysz County =

Łazy
- Village
- Location within Poland
- Coordinates: 53°13′26″N 20°47′33″E
- Country: Poland
- Voivodeship: Masovian
- County: Przasnysz
- Gmina: Chorzele
- Time zone: UTC+1 (CET)
  - Summer (DST): UTC+2 (CEST)

Łazy [ˈwazɨ] is a village in the administrative district of Gmina Chorzele, within Przasnysz County, Masovian Voivodeship, in north-central Poland.
