= Zaręby, Przasnysz County =

Zaręby
- Village
- Location within Poland
- Coordinates: 53°18′N 21°1′E
- Country: Poland
- Voivodeship: Masovian
- County: Przasnysz
- Gmina: Chorzele
- Population: 940

Zaręby [zaˈrɛmbɨ] is a village in the administrative district of Gmina Chorzele, within Przasnysz County, Masovian Voivodeship, in east-central Poland.
