= Żebry-Idźki =

- Village
- Location within Poland
- Coordinates: 53°2′15″N 20°41′40″E
- Country: Poland
- Voivodeship: Masovian
- County: Przasnysz
- Gmina: Czernice Borowe
- Population: 90

Żebry-Idźki [ˈʐɛbrɨ ˈit͡ɕki] is a village in the administrative district of Gmina Czernice Borowe, within Przasnysz County, Masovian Voivodeship, in east-central Poland.
