= Jarzynny Kierz =

- Village
- Location within Poland
- Coordinates: 53°17′3″N 20°43′24″E
- Country: Poland
- Voivodeship: Masovian
- County: Przasnysz
- Gmina: Chorzele
- Population: 20

Jarzynny Kierz [jaˈʐɨnnɨ ˈkʲɛʂ] is a village in the administrative district of Gmina Chorzele, within Przasnysz County, Masovian Voivodeship, in east-central Poland.
