= Pawłówko, Przasnysz County =

Pawłówko
- Village
- Location within Poland
- Coordinates: 53°6′N 20°44′E
- Country: Poland
- Voivodeship: Masovian
- County: Przasnysz
- Gmina: Czernice Borowe

Pawłówko [paˈvwufkɔ] is a village in the administrative district of Gmina Czernice Borowe, within Przasnysz County, Masovian Voivodeship, in east-central Poland.
