= Dąbrówka Ostrowska =

- Village
- Location within Poland
- Coordinates: 53°16′39″N 20°50′10″E
- Country: Poland
- Voivodeship: Masovian
- County: Przasnysz
- Gmina: Chorzele

Dąbrówka Ostrowska [dɔmˈbrufka ɔsˈtrɔfska] is a village in the administrative district of Gmina Chorzele, within Przasnysz County, Masovian Voivodeship, in East-Central Poland.
