= Bobry, Masovian Voivodeship =

Bobry
- Village
- Location within Poland
- Coordinates: 53°15′57″N 20°50′0″E
- Country: Poland
- Voivodeship: Masovian
- County: Przasnysz
- Gmina: Chorzele

Bobry [ˈbɔbrɨ] is a village in the Administrative District of Gmina Chorzele, within Przasnysz County, Masovian Voivodeship, in east-central Poland.
