= Pawłowo Kościelne =

- Village
- Location within Poland
- Coordinates: 53°4′N 20°43′E
- Country: Poland
- Voivodeship: Masovian
- County: Przasnysz
- Gmina: Czernice Borowe

Pawłowo Kościelne [paˈvwɔvɔ kɔɕˈt͡ɕɛlnɛ] is a village in the administrative district of Gmina Czernice Borowe, within Przasnysz County, Masovian Voivodeship, in east-central Poland.
