= Kadzielnia, Masovian Voivodeship =

Kadzielnia
- Village
- Location within Poland
- Coordinates: 53°5′25″N 20°41′51″E
- Country: Poland
- Voivodeship: Masovian
- County: Przasnysz
- Gmina: Czernice Borowe
- Population: 60

Kadzielnia [kaˈd͡ʑɛlɲa] is a village in the administrative district of Gmina Czernice Borowe, within Przasnysz County, Masovian Voivodeship, in east-central Poland.
