= Kwiatkowo, Masovian Voivodeship =

Kwiatkowo
- Village
- Location within Poland
- Coordinates: 53°19′01″N 21°03′20″E
- Country: Poland
- Voivodeship: Masovian
- County: Przasnysz
- Gmina: Chorzele

Kwiatkowo [kfjatˈkɔvɔ] is a village in the administrative district of Gmina Chorzele, within Przasnysz County, Masovian Voivodeship, in east-central Poland.
