= Bogdany Małe =

Village in Gmina Chorzele, Poland

- Village
- Location within Poland
- Coordinates: 53°14′19″N 20°51′5″E
- Country: Poland
- Voivodeship: Masovian
- County: Przasnysz
- Gmina: Chorzele

Bogdany Małe [bɔɡˈdanɨ ˈmawɛ] is a village in the administrative district of Gmina Chorzele, within Przasnysz County, Masovian Voivodeship, in east-central Poland.
