= Dąbrowa, Przasnysz County =

Dąbrowa
- Village
- Location within Poland
- Coordinates: 53°21′10″N 20°48′43″E
- Country: Poland
- Voivodeship: Masovian
- County: Przasnysz
- Gmina: Chorzele

Dąbrowa [dɔmˈbrɔva] is a village in the administrative district of Gmina Chorzele, within Przasnysz County, Masovian Voivodeship, in east-central Poland.
