= Wierzchowizna =

- Village
- Location within Poland
- Coordinates: 53°17′N 21°11′E
- Country: Poland
- Voivodeship: Masovian
- County: Przasnysz
- Gmina: Chorzele

Wierzchowizna [vjɛʂxɔˈvizna] is a village in the administrative district of Gmina Chorzele, within Przasnysz County, Masovian Voivodeship, in east-central Poland.
