= Rapaty-Górki =

- Village
- Location within Poland
- Coordinates: 53°15′07″N 20°48′54″E
- Country: Poland
- Voivodeship: Masovian
- County: Przasnysz
- Gmina: Chorzele

Rapaty-Górki [raˈpatɨ ˈɡurki] is a village in the administrative district of Gmina Chorzele, within Przasnysz County, Masovian Voivodeship, in east-central Poland.

== History ==
The Gmina Chorzele village was founded in 1279 in Gmina Chorzele by the king of Przemysl in honour of his wife Chirza Czerna (1280). The exact date of this founding is not known, although the village was founded prior to 1309, in the second year of the reign of King Sigismund, in which the city of Gmina Chorzele was founded. Following the foundation of Gmina Chorzele, the village grew rapidly. It was eventually subdivided into two villages. By the fifteenth century the village had reached full size.
