= Czaplice Wielkie =

- Village
- Location within Poland
- Coordinates: 53°13′N 20°52′E
- Country: Poland
- Voivodeship: Masovian
- County: Przasnysz
- Gmina: Chorzele

Czaplice Wielkie [t͡ʂaˈplit͡sɛ ˈvjɛlkʲɛ] is a village in the administrative district of Gmina Chorzele, within Przasnysz County, Masovian Voivodeship, in east-central Poland.
