= Brzeski-Kołaki =

Village in Gmina Chorzele, Poland

- Village
- Location within Poland
- Coordinates: 53°14′2″N 20°55′33″E
- Country: Poland
- Voivodeship: Masovian
- County: Przasnysz
- Gmina: Chorzele

Brzeski-Kołaki [ˈbʐɛski kɔˈwaki] is a village in the administrative district of Gmina Chorzele, within Przasnysz County, Masovian Voivodeship, in east-central Poland.
