= Nakieł =

- Village
- Location within Poland
- Coordinates: 53°08′34″N 21°07′56″E
- Country: Poland
- Voivodeship: Masovian
- County: Przasnysz
- Gmina: Jednorożec
- Website: http://www.jednorozec.pl/

Nakieł [ˈnakʲɛw] is a village in the administrative district of Gmina Jednorożec, within Przasnysz County, Masovian Voivodeship, in east-central Poland.

== History ==
Nakieł was a peasant village founded in the first part of the nineteenth century, and, by the middle of the nineteenth century contained only a few homes.

In 1867 the village became part of the Gmina Jednorożec, and, by 1885, there were eight homes and 65 residents on 71 hectares of cultivated land and 7 hectares of wasteland.

After World War I, in 1921, the census indicated the village contained 10 homes and 59 inhabitants.

== See also ==
- Gmina Jednorożec
- Jednorożec
