= Borkowo-Boksy =

- Village
- Location within Poland
- Coordinates: 53°04′23″N 20°46′14″E
- Country: Poland
- Voivodeship: Masovian
- County: Przasnysz
- Gmina: Czernice Borowe

Borkowo-Boksy [bɔrˈkɔvɔ ˈbɔksɨ] is a village in the administrative district of Gmina Czernice Borowe, within Przasnysz County, Masovian Voivodeship, in east-central Poland.
