= Łaz, Masovian Voivodeship =

Łaz
- Village
- Location within Poland
- Coordinates: 53°17′N 21°0′E
- Country: Poland
- Voivodeship: Masovian
- County: Przasnysz
- Gmina: Chorzele

Łaz [was] is a village in the administrative district of Gmina Chorzele, within Przasnysz County, Masovian Voivodeship, in east-central Poland.
