= Nowa Wieś koło Duczymina =

- Village
- Location within Poland
- Coordinates: 53°17′03″N 20°48′03″E
- Country: Poland
- Voivodeship: Masovian
- County: Przasnysz
- Gmina: Chorzele

Nowa Wieś koło Duczymina [ˈnɔva ˈvjɛɕ ˈkɔwɔ dut͡ʂɨˈmina] ("new village by Duczymin") is a village in the administrative district of Gmina Chorzele, within Przasnysz County, Masovian Voivodeship, in east-central Poland.
