= Turowo, Przasnysz County =

Turowo
- Village
- Location within Poland
- Coordinates: 52°59′N 20°49′E
- Country: Poland
- Voivodeship: Masovian
- County: Przasnysz
- Gmina: Czernice Borowe

Turowo [tuˈrɔvɔ] is a village in the administrative district of Gmina Czernice Borowe, within Przasnysz County, Masovian Voivodeship, in east-central Poland.
