= Kosmowo, Masovian Voivodeship =

Kosmowo
- Village
- Location within Poland
- Coordinates: 53°5′N 20°42′E
- Country: Poland
- Voivodeship: Masovian
- County: Przasnysz
- Gmina: Czernice Borowe

Kosmowo [kɔsˈmɔvɔ] is a village in the administrative district of Gmina Czernice Borowe, within Przasnysz County, Masovian Voivodeship, in east-central Poland.
