= Pierzchały, Przasnysz County =

Pierzchały
- Village
- Location within Poland
- Coordinates: 53°05′05″N 20°46′40″E
- Country: Poland
- Voivodeship: Masovian
- County: Przasnysz
- Gmina: Czernice Borowe

Pierzchały [pjɛʂˈxawɨ] is a village in the administrative district of Gmina Czernice Borowe, within Przasnysz County, Masovian Voivodeship, in east-central Poland.
