= Grąd Rycicki =

Village in Gmina Chorzele, Poland

- Village
- Location within Poland
- Coordinates: 53°13′36″N 20°58′47″E
- Country: Poland
- Voivodeship: Masovian
- County: Przasnysz
- Gmina: Chorzele

Grąd Rycicki [ˈɡrɔnt rɨˈt͡ɕit͡ski] is a village in the administrative district of Gmina Chorzele, within Przasnysz County, Masovian Voivodeship, in east-central Poland.
