= Polon =

Polon may refer to:

- Polon (anime)
- Połoń, a village in Poland
- Eduard Polón (1861–1930), Finnish business leader and political patriot
- Błażyński Polon, a Polish sailplane
