= Borkowo-Falenta =

- Village
- Location within Poland
- Coordinates: 53°04′47″N 20°45′35″E
- Country: Poland
- Voivodeship: Masovian
- County: Przasnysz
- Gmina: Czernice Borowe
- Population: 230

Borkowo-Falenta [bɔrˈkɔvɔ faˈlɛnta] is a village in the administrative district of Gmina Czernice Borowe, within Przasnysz County, Masovian Voivodeship, in east-central Poland.
