= Bagienice, Masovian Voivodeship =

Bagienice
- Village
- Location within Poland
- Coordinates: 53°15′23″N 20°51′32″E
- Country: Poland
- Voivodeship: Masovian
- County: Przasnysz
- Gmina: Chorzele

Bagienice (Polish pronunciation: [baɡʲɛˈɲitsɛ]) is a village in the administrative district of Gmina Chorzele, within Przasnysz County, Masovian Voivodeship, in east-central Poland.
