= Zdziwój Nowy =

- Village
- Location within Poland
- Coordinates: 53°17′17″N 20°45′36″E
- Country: Poland
- Voivodeship: Masovian
- County: Przasnysz
- Gmina: Chorzele

Zdziwój Nowy [ˈzd͡ʑivui̯ ˈnɔvɨ] is a village in the administrative district of Gmina Chorzele, within Przasnysz County, Masovian Voivodeship, in east-central Poland.
