= Budy Rządowe =

- Village
- Location within Poland
- Coordinates: 53°10′N 21°8′E
- Country: Poland
- Voivodeship: Masovian
- County: Przasnysz
- Gmina: Jednorożec
- Website: http://www.jednorozec.pl/

Budy Rządowe [ˈbudɨ ʐɔnˈdɔvɛ] is a village in the administrative district of Gmina Jednorożec, within Przasnysz County, Masovian Voivodeship, in east-central Poland.
