= Ulatowo-Słabogóra =

- Village
- Location within Poland
- Coordinates: 53°10′29″N 21°00′02″E
- Country: Poland
- Voivodeship: Masovian
- County: Przasnysz
- Gmina: Jednorożec

Ulatowo-Słabogóra [ulaˈtɔvɔ swabɔˈɡura] is a village in the administrative district of Gmina Jednorożec, within Przasnysz County, Masovian Voivodeship, in east-central Poland.
