= Chrostowo Wielkie =

- Village
- Location within Poland
- Coordinates: 53°0′17″N 20°42′46″E
- Country: Poland
- Voivodeship: Masovian
- County: Przasnysz
- Gmina: Czernice Borowe
- Population: 260

Chrostowo Wielkie [xrɔsˈtɔvɔ ˈvjɛlkʲɛ] is a village in the administrative district of Gmina Czernice Borowe, within Przasnysz County, Masovian Voivodeship, in east-central Poland.
