= Czarzaste Wielkie =

- Village
- Location within Poland
- Coordinates: 53°14′29″N 20°48′55″E
- Country: Poland
- Voivodeship: Masovian
- County: Przasnysz
- Gmina: Chorzele

Czarzaste Wielkie [t͡ʂaˈʐastɛ ˈvjɛlkʲɛ] is a village in the administrative district of Gmina Chorzele, within Przasnysz County, Masovian Voivodeship, in east-central Poland.
