= Połoń =

- Village
- Location within Poland
- Coordinates: 53°13′N 20°59′E
- Country: Poland
- Voivodeship: Masovian
- County: Przasnysz
- Gmina: Jednorożec
- Website: http://www.jednorozec.pl/

Połoń [ˈpɔwɔɲ] is a village in the administrative district of Gmina Jednorożec, within Przasnysz County, Masovian Voivodeship, in east-central Poland.

== History ==
The first evidence of the existence of the settlement now known as Połoń is recorded in historical documents dated 1526. In 1605 the village was operated under lease, with the villagers paying rent, and, in 1633 the lease was held by Jan Kazimierz Krasiński. In 1781 the village had 21 homes.

During the years 1795–1864, the village was administered by its own village government. In 1867 the village was placed under the governance of the Gmina Jednorożec. A census in 1889 indicated that the village had 51 homes, 319 inhabitants, 1,194 hectares under cultivation, and 60 hectares of uncultivated land.

After World War I, in 1921, Połoń recorded that it contained 71 homes and 417 inhabitants, including two Jews. The grocery store in the village was operated by L. Aleksieja.

== See also ==
- Gmina Jednorożec
- Jednorożec
