= Zagaty, Masovian Voivodeship =

Zagaty
- Village
- Location within Poland
- Coordinates: 53°14′N 20°58′E
- Country: Poland
- Voivodeship: Masovian
- County: Przasnysz
- Gmina: Chorzele

Zagaty [zaˈɡatɨ] is a village in the administrative district of Gmina Chorzele, within Przasnysz County, Masovian Voivodeship, in east-central Poland.
