= Rycice =

- Village
- Location within Poland
- Coordinates: 53°12′40″N 20°52′24″E
- Country: Poland
- Voivodeship: Masovian
- County: Przasnysz
- Gmina: Chorzele
- Population: 340

Rycice [rɨˈt͡ɕit͡sɛ] is a village in the administrative district of Gmina Chorzele, within Przasnysz County, Masovian Voivodeship, in east-central Poland.
