= Czaplice-Piłaty =

Village in Gmina Chorzele, Poland

- Village
- Location within Poland
- Coordinates: 53°12′11″N 20°52′00″E
- Country: Poland
- Voivodeship: Masovian
- County: Przasnysz
- Gmina: Chorzele

Czaplice-Piłaty [t͡ʂaˈplit͡sɛ piˈwatɨ] is a village in the administrative district of Gmina Chorzele, within Przasnysz County, Masovian Voivodeship, in east-central Poland.
