= Nowe Czernice =

- Village
- Location within Poland
- Coordinates: 53°01′58″N 20°44′12″E
- Country: Poland
- Voivodeship: Masovian
- County: Przasnysz
- Gmina: Czernice Borowe

Nowe Czernice [ˈnɔvɛ t͡ʂɛrˈnit͡sɛ] is a village in the administrative district of Gmina Czernice Borowe, within Przasnysz County, Masovian Voivodeship, in east-central Poland.
