= Bugzy-Święchy =

- Village
- Location within Poland
- Coordinates: 53°15′41″N 20°44′56″E
- Country: Poland
- Voivodeship: Masovian
- County: Przasnysz
- Gmina: Chorzele
- Postal code: 06-330

Bugzy-Święchy (Polish pronunciation: [ˈbuɡzɨ ˈɕfjɛ̃xɨ]) is a village in the administrative district of Gmina Chorzele, within Przasnysz County, Masovian Voivodeship, in east-central Poland.
