= Aleksandrowo, Przasnysz County =

Aleksandrowo
- Village
- Location within Poland
- Coordinates: 53°13′22″N 20°52′16″E
- Country: Poland
- Voivodeship: Masovian
- County: Przasnysz
- Gmina: Chorzele
- Time zone: UTC+1 (CET)
  - Summer (DST): UTC+2 (CEST)
- Vehicle registration: WPZ

Aleksandrowo [alɛksanˈdrɔvɔ] is a village in the administrative district of Gmina Chorzele, within Przasnysz County, Masovian Voivodeship, in north-central Poland.
