= Lipowiec, Masovian Voivodeship =

Lipowiec
- Village
- Location within Poland
- Coordinates: 53°12′40″N 20°52′24″E
- Country: Poland
- Voivodeship: Masovian
- County: Przasnysz
- Gmina: Chorzele
- Population: 90

Lipowiec [liˈpɔvjɛt͡s] is a village in the administrative district of Gmina Chorzele, within Przasnysz County, Masovian Voivodeship, in east-central Poland.
