= Parciaki =

- Village
- Holy Trinity church in Parciaki

- Location within Poland
- Coordinates: 53°12′N 21°7′E
- Country: Poland
- Voivodeship: Masovian
- County: Przasnysz
- Gmina: Jednorożec
- Time zone: UTC+1 (CET)
  - Summer (DST): UTC+2 (CEST)
- Vehicle registration: WPZ

Parciaki [parˈt͡ɕaki] is a village in the administrative district of Gmina Jednorożec, within Przasnysz County, Masovian Voivodeship, in north-central Poland.

== History ==
Eleven Polish citizens were murdered by Nazi Germany in the village during World War II.
