= Jedlinka, Poland =

Jedlinka
- Village
- Location within Poland
- Coordinates: 53°18′N 20°47′E
- Country: Poland
- Voivodeship: Masovian
- County: Przasnysz
- Gmina: Chorzele

Jedlinka [jɛˈdlinka] is a village in the administrative district of Gmina Chorzele, within Przasnysz County, Masovian Voivodeship, in east-central Poland.
