= Grójec, Przasnysz County =

Grójec
- Village
- Location within Poland
- Coordinates: 53°3′N 20°49′E
- Country: Poland
- Voivodeship: Masovian
- County: Przasnysz
- Gmina: Czernice Borowe

Grójec [ˈɡrujɛt͡s] is a village in the administrative district of Gmina Czernice Borowe, within Przasnysz County, Masovian Voivodeship, in east-central Poland.
