= Węgra =

- Village
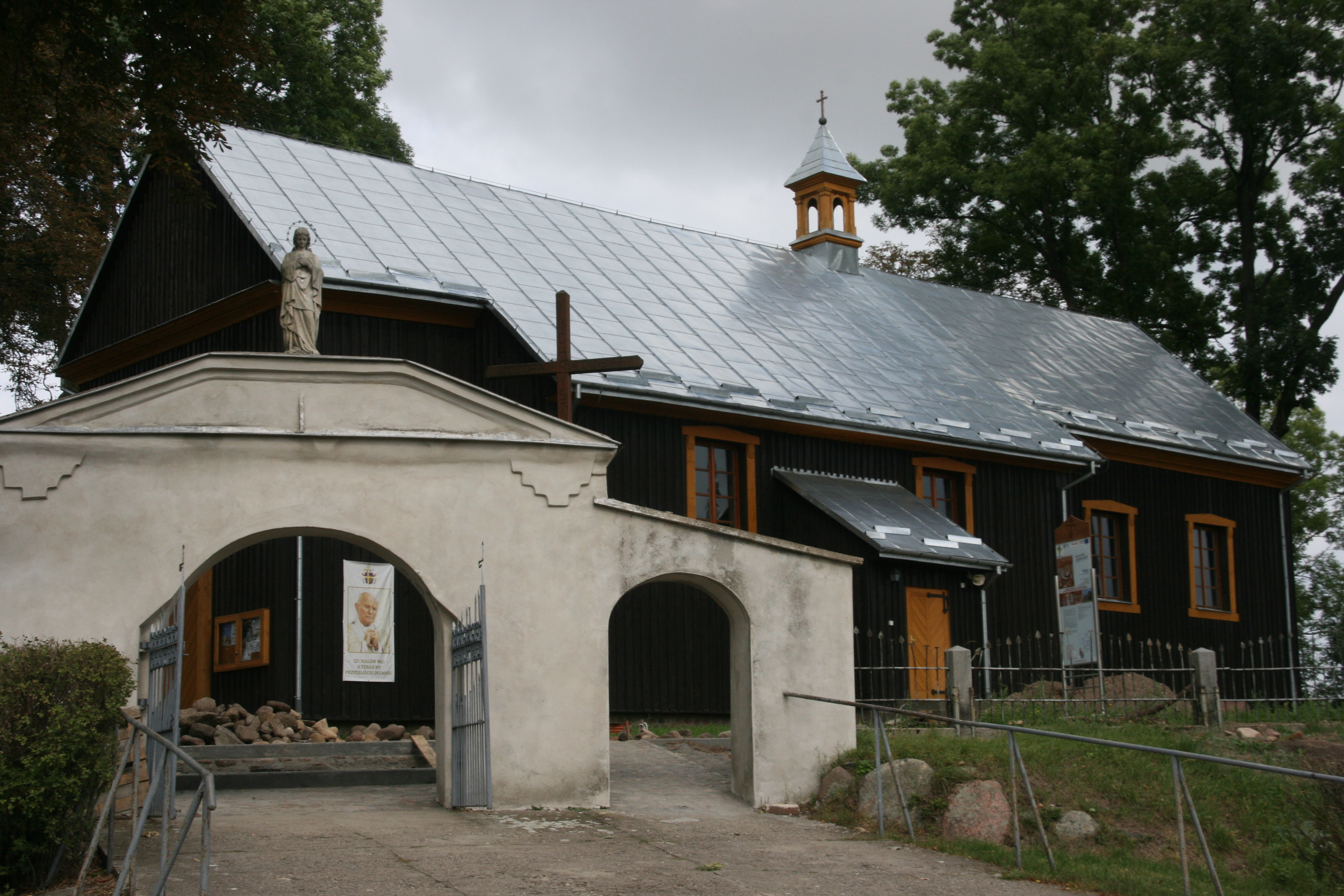
- Parish church of St. John the Baptist

- Location within Poland
- Coordinates: 53°03′03″N 20°45′46″E
- Country: Poland
- Voivodeship: Masovian
- County: Przasnysz
- Gmina: Czernice Borowe

Węgra [ˈvɛŋɡra] is a village in the administrative district of Gmina Czernice Borowe, within Przasnysz County, Masovian Voivodeship, in east-central Poland.
