= Nowa Wieś Zarębska =

- Village
- Location within Poland
- Coordinates: 53°17′06″N 21°08′37″E
- Country: Poland
- Voivodeship: Masovian
- County: Przasnysz
- Gmina: Chorzele

Nowa Wieś Zarębska [ˈnɔva ˈvjɛɕ zaˈrɛmpska] is a village in the administrative district of Gmina Chorzele, within Przasnysz County, Masovian Voivodeship, in east-central Poland.
