= Chorzele =

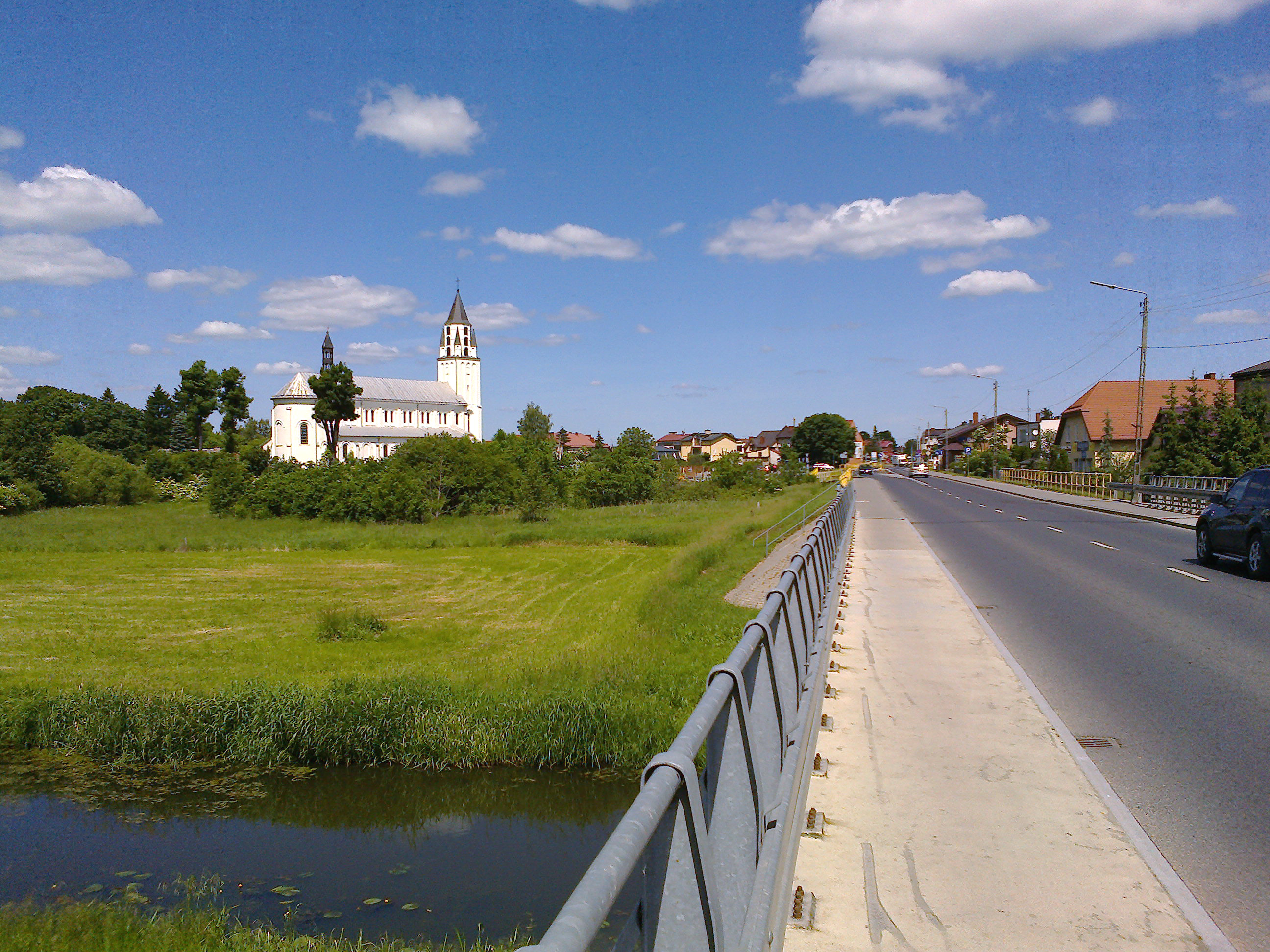
- View towards the town

- Flag Coat of arms

- Location within Poland
- Coordinates: 53°15′N 20°54′E
- Country: Poland
- Voivodeship: Masovian
- County: Przasnysz
- Gmina: Chorzele
- First mentioned: 1444
- Town rights: 1542-1870, 1919

Government
  - Mayor: Beata Szczepankowska (since 2010)

Area
  - Total: 17.51 km^{2} (6.76 sq mi)

Population (31 December 2021)
  - Total: 3,047
  - Density: 174.0/km^{2} (450.7/sq mi)
- Time zone: UTC+1 (CET)
  - Summer (DST): UTC+2 (CEST)
- Postal code: 06-330
- Area code: +48 29
- Car plates: WPZ
- Website: http://www.chorzele.pl/

Chorzele [xɔˈʐɛlɛ] is a town in Przasnysz County, Masovian Voivodeship, Poland, on the Orzyc River.

As of December 2021, the town has a population of 3,047.

The town is crossed by the national road No. 57 Bartoszyce - Pułtusk and provincial roads 614 to Myszyniec and 616 to Ciechanów. The international airport in Szymany is located 25 km (16 mi) north of the city.

== History ==
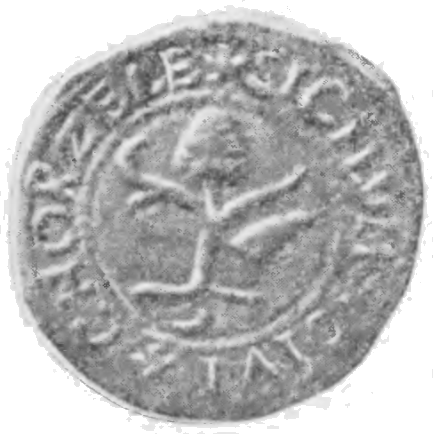
16th-century town seal of Chorzele

The first mention of Chorzele comes from a document of Duke Bolesław IV of Warsaw from 1444. The names comes from the Old Polish word orz or horz, similarly to the name of the Orzyc river. It was a settlement situated on the edge of the forest. It was vested with town rights in 1542. Chorzele was a royal town of the Crown of the Kingdom of Poland, administratively located in the Przasnysz County in the Masovian Voivodeship in the Greater Poland Province. It had trade contacts with Russia. The town was devastated during the Swedish invasion of Poland (Deluge) in the 1655–1656. To help revive the town, in 1690 King John III Sobieski granted new privileges, including annual fairs. The inhabitants fought against the invading Swedes in 1708 during the Great Northern War. Kings Augustus III of Poland and Stanisław August Poniatowski granted new privileges in 1757 and 1776.

In 1795 it became part of the Prussian Partition of Poland after the Third Partition of Poland. In 1807 it was regained by Poles and included within the short-lived Polish Duchy of Warsaw, and in 1815 it became part of Congress Poland in the Russian Partition of Poland. It was a governmental town of Congress Poland, administratively located in the Płock Voivodeship, and then in the Płock Governorate. In the 19th century the industry developed, large livestock fairs took place, and the town experienced a rapid growth of the Jewish population, which settled following the persecution and expulsion of Jews from Russia to the Russian Partition of Poland (see Pale of Settlement). Fights of the Polish November Uprising (1830–1831) were fought in the area. During the January Uprising, on February 3, 1863, Polish insurgents attacked stationed Russian troops in the town, and forced them to withdraw towards Opaleniec. Another clash between Polish insurgents and Russian troops occurred on March 14, 1863. In 1870 the municipal rights were revoked by the Russian administration as punishment for the uprising. In 1905 Chorzele was inhabited by 2,301 Jews, constituting 57% of the population. During World War I Chorzele suffered war damages that eventually limited the development of the town in the interbellum, and from November 1914 to 1918 it was under German occupation. In 1916 Chorzele obtained a railway connection.

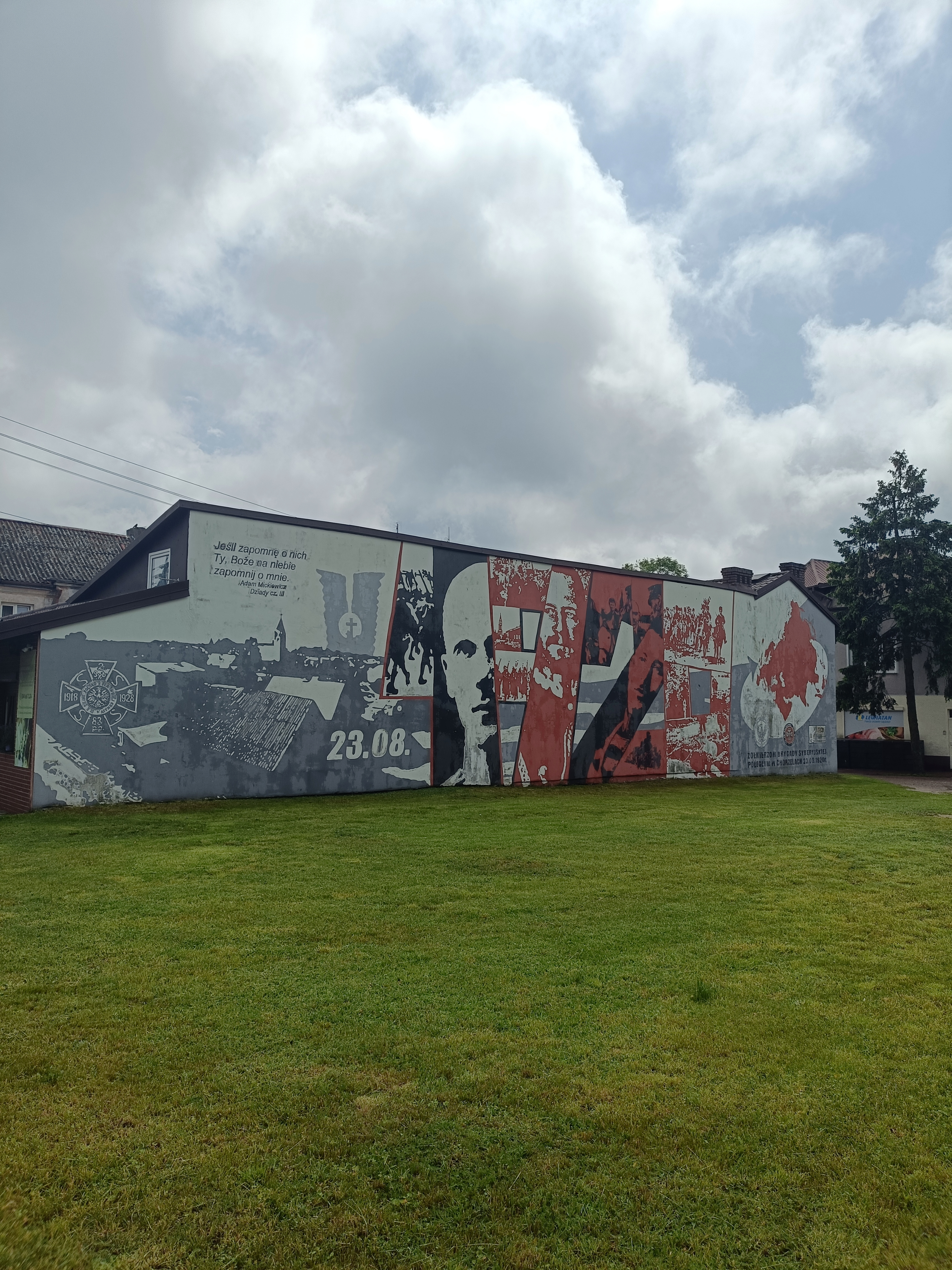
Mural commemorating the Polish victory in the Battle of Chorzele in 1920

After the war, in 1918, Poland regained independence, and in 1919 the town rights were restored. The Battle of Chorzele was fought during the Polish–Soviet War on August 23, 1920. A Polish Border Guard station was located in the town in the interwar period. According to the 1921 census, the town had a population of 2,454, 64.7% Polish and 35.3% Jewish. In 1930, Chorzele was visited by President of Poland, Ignacy Mościcki.

Following the joint German-Soviet invasion of Poland, which started World War II in September 1939, the town was occupied by Germany, which directly annexed it into the Third Reich and renamed it Chorzellern. In late 1939, local Polish priests Andrzej Krysiak and Franciszek Burawski were deported to the Soldau concentration camp and then murdered there. In 1940–1941, the anti-Polish propaganda film Heimkehr was shot in the town. In 1941, the Germans deported the local Jewish population, which was later exterminated in the Holocaust.

On 20 January 1945, the town was captured by Soviet troops of the 32nd Cavalry Division of the 3rd Army. It was afterwards restored to Poland, however with a Soviet-installed communist regime, which then stayed in power until the Fall of Communism in the 1980s. In December 1945, a unit of the Polish underground resistance broke the arrest of the Citizen's Militia and released 14 soldiers of the resistance movement.

In 1975, the Municipality of Chorzele was located within the framework of Ostrołęka Voivodeship, and since 1999 under the Przasnysz County in the Masovian Voivodeship.

== Demographics ==
Detailed data as of 31 December 2021:

Description	All		Women		Men	
Unit	person	percentage	person	percentage	person	percentage
Population	3047	100	1551	50.9%	1496	49.1%
Population density	174.0		88.6		85.4	

=== Number of inhabitants by year ===
Historical population

Year	Pop.	±%
1921	2,454	—
1995	2,643	+7.7%
2000	2,780	+5.2%
2005	2,780	+0.0%

Year	Pop.	±%
2010	2,969	+6.8%
2015	3,030	+2.1%
2020	3,100	+2.3%
2021	3,047	−1.7%

== Monuments ==
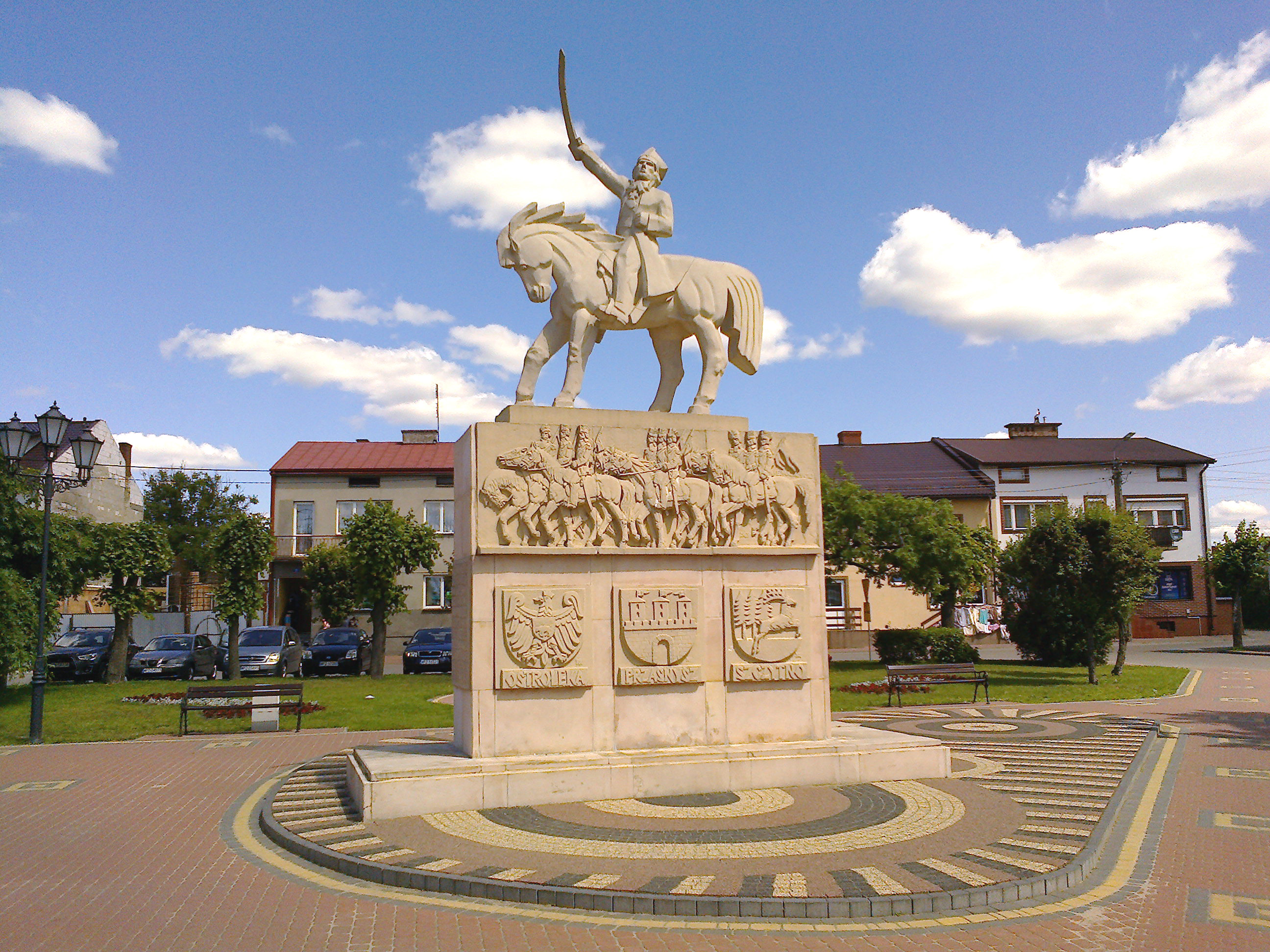
Tadeusz Kościuszko Monument

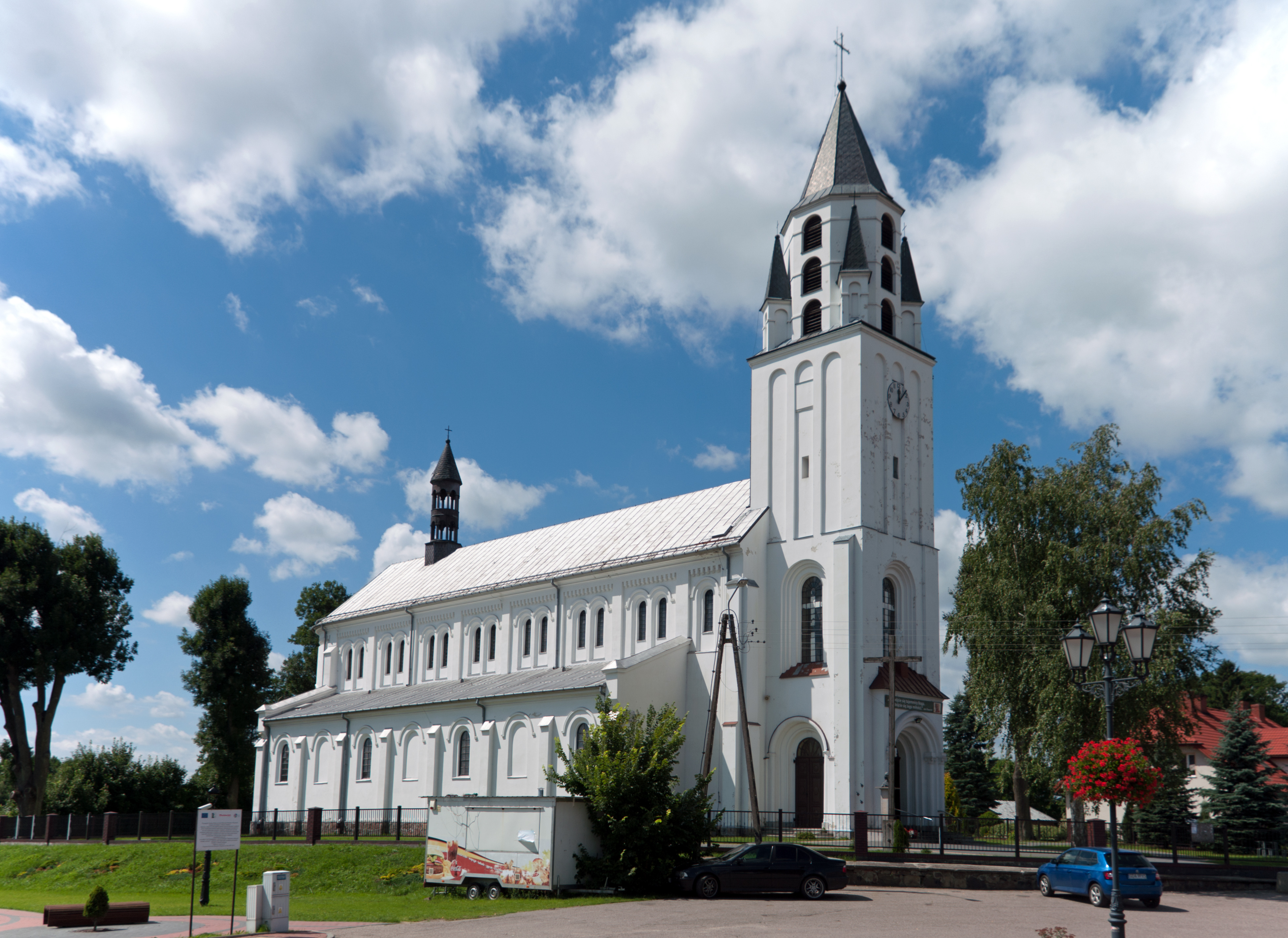
Holy Trinity church

Monuments include:

- Holy Trinity Church from 1878 to 1930.
- A malfunctioning wooden windmill from the 19th century.
- A statue of Tadeusz Kosciuszko.
- A 19th-century Jewish cemetery devastated during the German occupation.

== Culture ==
There are festivals in Chorzele, such as the folklore meeting or Sundays in the city. In addition, art and recitation competitions and a song festival are organized. There is a Public Library in the city. There are also firefighting competitions.

== Mayors of Chorzele ==
- Krzysztof Nieliwodzki (1998-1999)
- Janusz Nidzgorski (1999-2002)
- Andrzej Krawczyk (2002-2006)
- Wojciech Kobyliński (2006-2010)
- Beata Szczepankowska (since 2010)
