= Ulatowo-Dąbrówka =

- Village
- Location within Poland
- Coordinates: 53°10′39″N 20°58′17″E
- Country: Poland
- Voivodeship: Masovian
- County: Przasnysz
- Gmina: Jednorożec

Ulatowo-Dąbrówka [ulaˈtɔvɔ dɔmˈbrufka] is a village in the administrative district of Gmina Jednorożec, within Przasnysz County, Masovian Voivodeship, in east-central Poland.
