= Dzielin =

- Village
- Location within Poland
- Coordinates: 53°2′N 20°45′E
- Country: Poland
- Voivodeship: Masovian
- County: Przasnysz
- Gmina: Czernice Borowe

Dzielin [ˈd͡ʑɛlin] is a village in the administrative district of Gmina Czernice Borowe, within Przasnysz County, Masovian Voivodeship, in east-central Poland.
