= Raszujka =

- Village
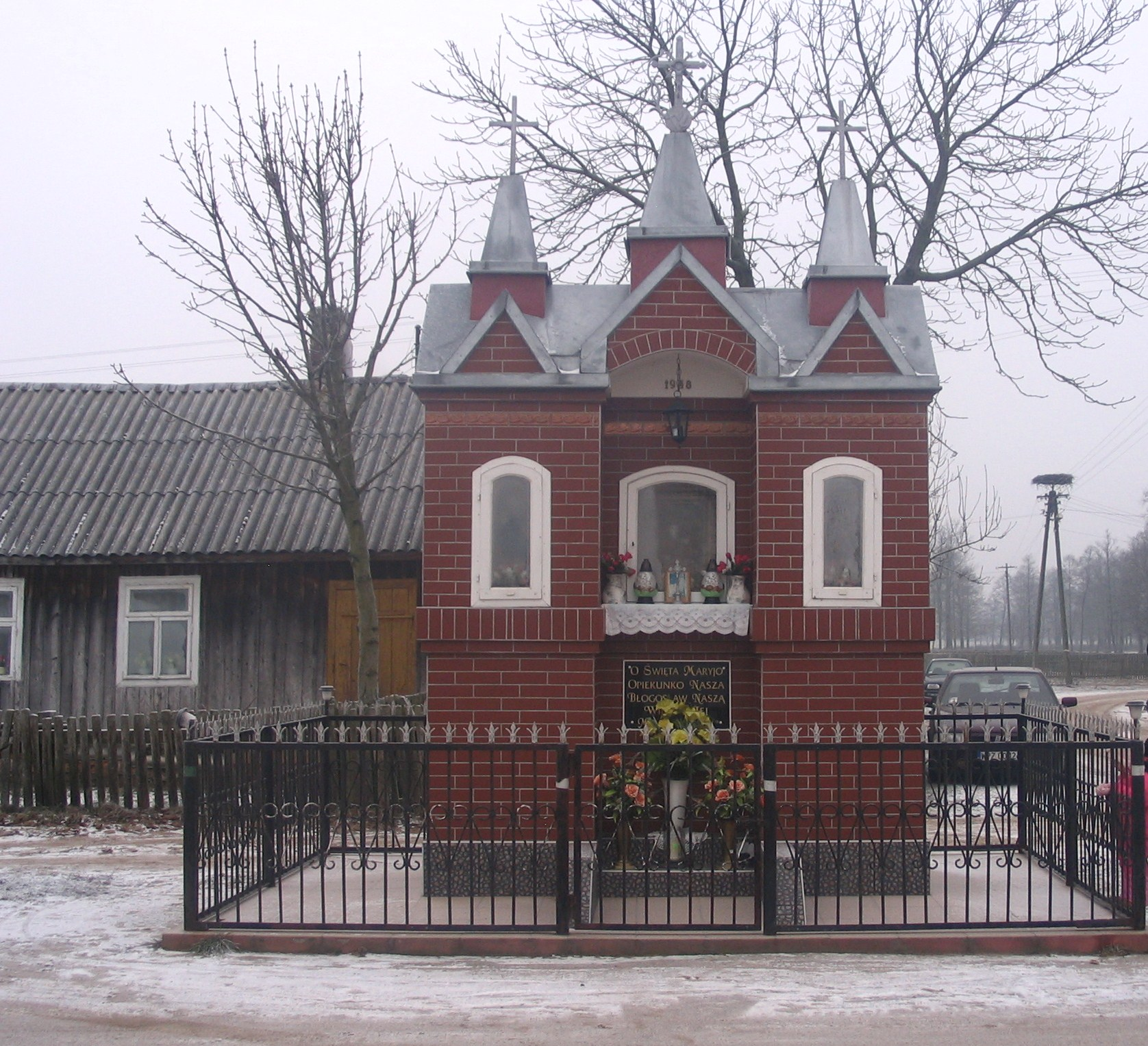

- Location within Poland
- Coordinates: 53°14′41″N 20°59′35″E
- Country: Poland
- Voivodeship: Masovian
- County: Przasnysz
- Gmina: Chorzele

Raszujka [raˈʂui̯ka] is a village in the administrative district of Gmina Chorzele, within Przasnysz County, Masovian Voivodeship, in east-central Poland.
