= Zberoż =

- Village
- Location within Poland
- Coordinates: 53°4′N 20°45′E
- Country: Poland
- Voivodeship: Masovian
- County: Przasnysz
- Gmina: Czernice Borowe

Zberoż [ˈzbɛrɔʂ] is a village in the administrative district of Gmina Czernice Borowe, within Przasnysz County, Masovian Voivodeship, in east-central Poland.
