= Żelazna Rządowa =

- Village
- Location within Poland
- Coordinates: 53°13′51″N 21°7′45″E
- Country: Poland
- Voivodeship: Masovian
- County: Przasnysz
- Gmina: Jednorożec

Żelazna Rządowa [ʐɛˈlazna ʐɔnˈdɔva] is a village in the administrative district of Gmina Jednorożec, within Przasnysz County, Masovian Voivodeship, in east-central Poland.
