= Budki, Przasnysz County =

Budki
- Village
- Location within Poland
- Coordinates: 53°15′N 20°58′E
- Country: Poland
- Voivodeship: Masovian
- County: Przasnysz
- Gmina: Chorzele

Budki [ˈbutki] is a village in the administrative district of Gmina Chorzele, within Przasnysz County, Masovian Voivodeship, in east-central Poland.
