= Krzynowłoga Wielka Commune =

Gmina Krzynowłoga Wielka was a rural gmina (administrative district) existing from 1919 to 1954 in Warsaw Voivodeship. Its seat was Krzynowłoga Wielka.
