= Górki, Przasnysz County =

Górki
- Village
- Location within Poland
- Coordinates: 53°0′33″N 20°46′32″E
- Country: Poland
- Voivodeship: Masovian
- County: Przasnysz
- Gmina: Czernice Borowe
- Population: 110

Górki [ˈɡurki] is a village in the administrative district of Gmina Czernice Borowe, within Przasnysz County, Masovian Voivodeship, in east-central Poland.
