= Lipa, Przasnysz County =

Lipa
- Village
- Location within Poland
- Coordinates: 53°05′01″N 21°01′58″E
- Country: Poland
- Voivodeship: Masovian
- County: Przasnysz
- Gmina: Jednorożec
- Website: www.jednorozec.pl

Lipa [ˈlipa] is a village in the administrative district of Gmina Jednorożec, within Przasnysz County, Masovian Voivodeship, in east-central Poland.

== History ==
Lipa was originally a royal village, first noted in historical documents dated 1475. Because of its special royal status it became a trading post for knights seeking goods for trade.

In 1795 Lipa was established as a governmental village, and, by 1827, there were 38 houses and 252 inhabitants. Lipa was thus, for the times, a relatively large and successful village with craftsmen, beekeepers, the peasants, and a tavern.

During the late nineteenth center, Lipa prospered and grew, and now included two windmills and an inn, 71 homes and 618 residents, who cultivated 1,587 hectares of land and maintained 324 hectares of forest.

During World War I, villagers fought for their liberation from tsarist occupation. A resistance group, called “Polish Military Organisation” (Polska Organizacja Wojskowa) was formed and included a number of the village's residents, including Aleksander Gwiazda, Gwiazda (brother of Aleksandra), Ignacy Pokorski, Wacław Połomski, Aleksander Przybyłek and Wacław Szmytkowski.

In 1921 the village, which was now part of the Gmina Jednorożec, contained 101 homes and 606 inhabitants, and its inhabitants included coopers, carpenters, basket makers, blacksmiths, grocers, and shoemakers.

== See also ==
- Gmina Jednorożec
- Jednorożec
