= Zembrzus Wielki =

- Village
- Location within Poland
- Coordinates: 53°2′N 20°42′E
- Country: Poland
- Voivodeship: Masovian
- County: Przasnysz
- Gmina: Czernice Borowe
- Area: 0.339 km^{2} (0.131 sq mi)
- Population (2015): 66
  - Density: 190/km^{2} (500/sq mi)

Zembrzus Wielki (Polish pronunciation: [ˈzɛmbʐuz ˈvjɛlkʲi]) is a village in the administrative district of Gmina Czernice Borowe, within Przasnysz County, Masovian Voivodeship, in east-central Poland.
