= Opaleniec =

- Village
- Location within Poland
- Coordinates: 53°17′N 20°55′E
- Country: Poland
- Voivodeship: Masovian
- County: Przasnysz
- Gmina: Chorzele

Opaleniec [ɔpaˈlɛɲɛt͡s] is a village in the administrative district of Gmina Chorzele, within Przasnysz County, Masovian Voivodeship, in east-central Poland.

== History ==
The village existed in 1550 and was so-called church village. Before World War I, border markets were held twice a year in Opaleniec. During the interwar period, near Opaleniec, a German-Polish border ran (Opaleniec / Opalenietz was in East Prussia), there was a customs office in the village.

== Notable residents ==
- Emil Badorrek (1910–1944), German Luftwaffe pilot
