= Gmina Czernice Borowe =

Gmina Czernice Borowe Czernice Borowe Commune
- Gmina
- Flag Coat of arms
- Interactive map of Gmina Czernice Borowe
- Coordinates (Czernice Borowe): 53°1′53″N 20°43′7″E
- Country: Poland
- Voivodeship: Masovian
- County: Przasnysz
- Seat: Czernice Borowe

Area
  - Total: 120.31 km^{2} (46.45 sq mi)

Population (2013)
  - Total: 3,933
  - Density: 32.69/km^{2} (84.67/sq mi)
- Website: http://www.czerniceborowe.pl/

Gmina Czernice Borowe is a rural gmina (administrative district) in Przasnysz County, Masovian Voivodeship, in east-central Poland. Its seat is the village of Czernice Borowe, which lies approximately 12 kilometres (7 mi) west of Przasnysz and 93 km (58 mi) north of Warsaw.

The gmina covers an area of 120.31 square kilometres (46.5 sq mi), and as of 2006 its total population is 4,029 (3,933 in 2013).

== Villages ==
Gmina Czernice Borowe contains the villages and settlements of Borkowo-Boksy, Borkowo-Falenta, Chojnowo, Chrostowo Wielkie, Czernice Borowe, Dzielin, Górki, Grójec, Jastrzębiec, Kadzielnia, Kosmowo, Miłoszewiec, Nowe Czernice, Obrębiec, Olszewiec, Pawłówko, Pawłowo Kościelne, Pierzchały, Rostkowo, Szczepanki, Turowo, Węgra, Załogi, Zberoż, Żebry-Idźki, Żebry-Kordy and Zembrzus Wielki.

== Neighbouring gminas ==
Gmina Czernice Borowe is bordered by the gminas of Dzierzgowo, Grudusk, Krasne, Krzynowłoga Mała, Opinogóra Górna, Przasnysz and Regimin.
