= Olszewiec, Masovian Voivodeship =

Olszewiec
- Village
- Location within Poland
- Coordinates: 53°3′N 20°48′E
- Country: Poland
- Voivodeship: Masovian
- County: Przasnysz
- Gmina: Czernice Borowe

Olszewiec [ɔlˈʂɛvjɛt͡s] is a village in the administrative district of Gmina Czernice Borowe, within Przasnysz County, Masovian Voivodeship, in east-central Poland.
