= Gmina Jednorożec =

Gmina Jednorożec Jednorożec Commune
- Gmina
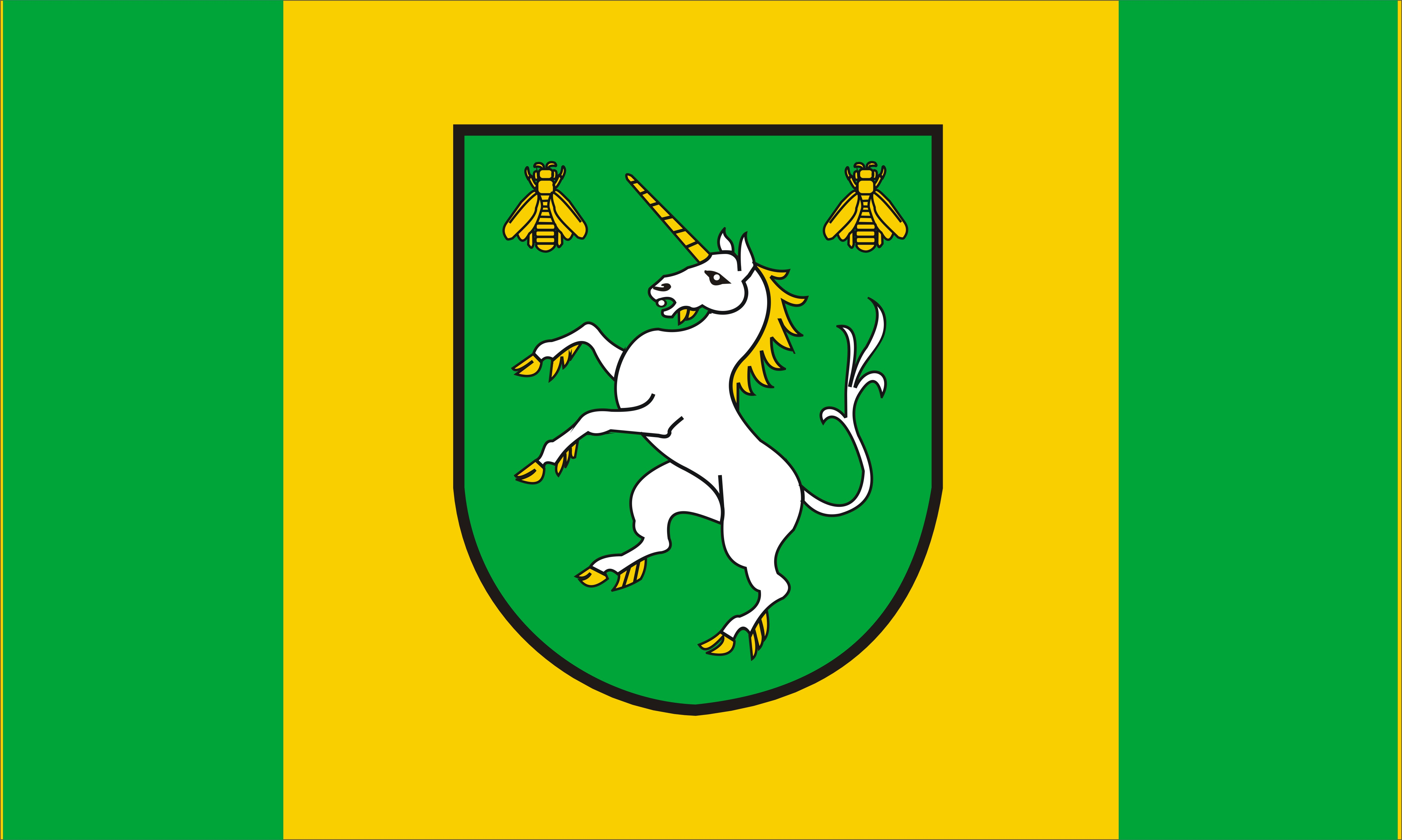
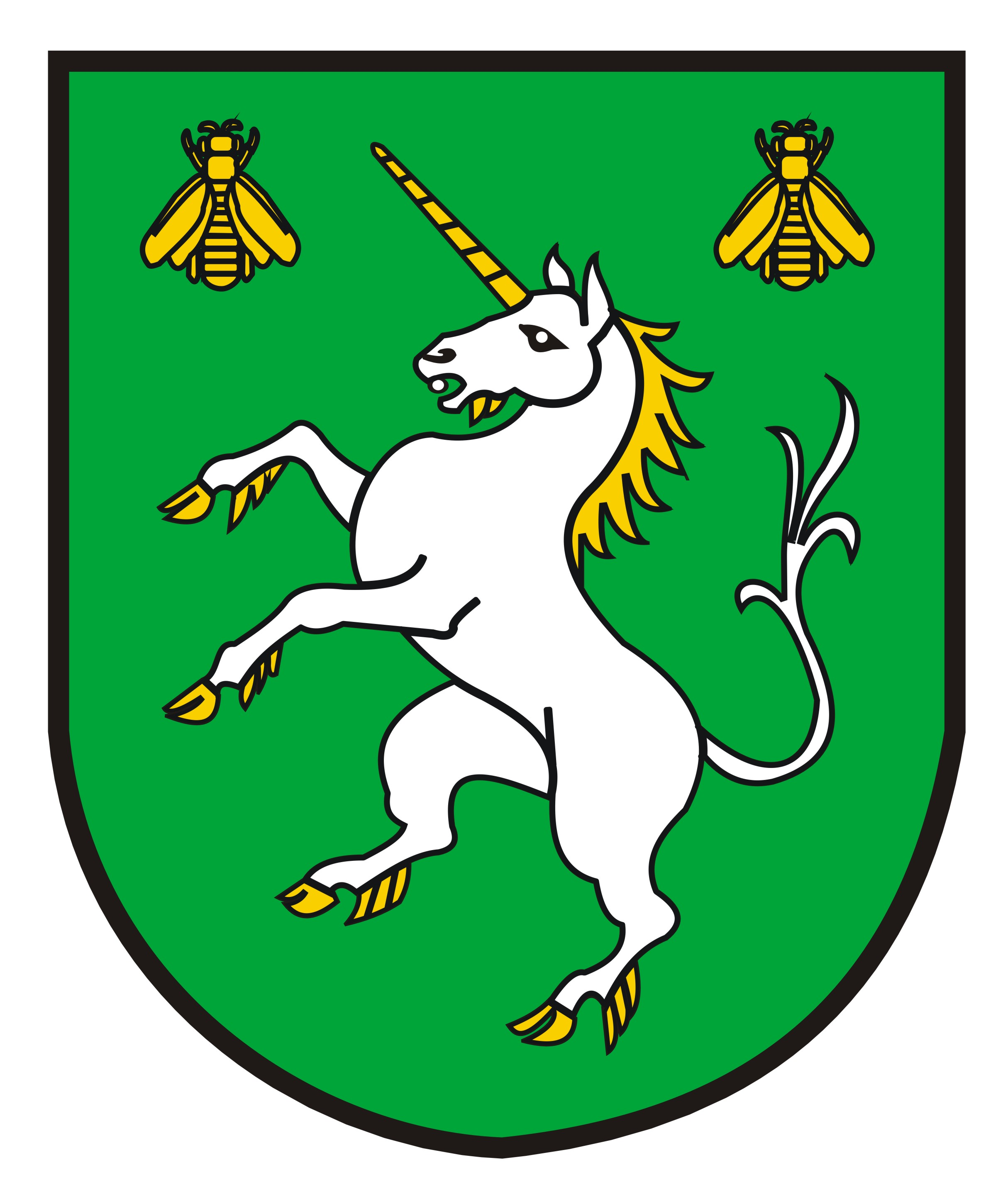
- Flag Coat of arms
- Interactive map of Gmina Jednorożec
- Coordinates (Jednorożec): 53°8′37″N 21°3′12″E
- Country: Poland
- Voivodeship: Masovian
- County: Przasnysz
- Seat: Jednorożec

Area
  - Total: 231.57 km^{2} (89.41 sq mi)

Population (2013)
  - Total: 7,309
  - Density: 31.56/km^{2} (81.75/sq mi)
- Website: http://www.jednorozec.pl/

Gmina Jednorożec is a rural gmina (administrative district) in Przasnysz County, Masovian Voivodeship, in east-central Poland. Its seat is the village of Jednorożec, which lies approximately 19 kilometres (12 mi) north-east of Przasnysz and 103 km (64 mi) north of Warsaw.

The gmina covers an area of 231.57 square kilometres (89.4 sq mi), and as of 2006 its total population is 7,192 (7,309 in 2013).

== History ==
In 1867 the gmina was established with Jednorożec as its seat. Gmina Jednorożec contained 586 houses and 4,376 inhabitants (in 1882) and was contained within an area of 35,391 hectares. In the Jednorożec gmina were the chapel, the office of the municipality, the municipal court, post border guards, forestry office, four tar factories, three windmills, and two inns.

== Villages ==
Gmina Jednorożec contains the villages and settlements of Budy Rządowe, Drążdżewo Nowe, Dynak, Jednorożec, Kobylaki-Czarzaste, Kobylaki-Konopki, Kobylaki-Korysze, Kobylaki-Wólka, Lipa, Małowidz, Nakieł, Obórki, Olszewka, Parciaki, Połoń, Stegna, Ulatowo-Dąbrówka, Ulatowo-Pogorzel, Ulatowo-Słabogóra, Żelazna Prywatna and Żelazna Rządowa.

== Coat of arms ==
The gmina was named Jednorożec (meaning “unicorn”) based on the local legend of a beekeeper who saw a unicorn in the area which was, at the time, a royal hunting preserve. According to the legend, Prince Janusz III Mazowiecki ordered the building of a hunting lodge on the spot, which he named Jednorożec (unicorn).

The coat of arms and the municipal flag consists of a unicorn, a mythical beast symbolizing wisdom, intelligence, courage, speed, nobility, and peace, accompanied by two bees. The unicorn is shown in the position of a Polish “battle” horse. The color green symbolizes the area’s forested Kurpie past, as well as the current “green” values of the local inhabitants, and the green color also refers to the area as part of what was once “Poland’s Green Lungs.”

== Gmina seat ==
The village of Jednorożec is the seat of the Gmina Jednorożec (administrative district) in Przasnysz County.

The municipal office is located in Jednorożec at ul. Reborn 14, 06-323 Jednorożec, and may be contacted by phone or e-mail.

Web address: www.jednorozec.pl

Current departments include: • Mayor • Secretary • Treasurer • Finance and Budget Office • Investment and Development Team • Head of the Office of Civil Status • Independent Workplace Affairs and Local Government Personnel • Independent Position for Defense, Civil Protection and Economic Crisis Management • Independent Workplace - Computer Science • Stand-alone post for Land Reclamation • Project Coordinator

== Neighbouring gminas ==
Gmina Jednorożec is bordered by the gminas of Baranowo, Chorzele, Krasnosielc, Krzynowłoga Mała, Płoniawy-Bramura and Przasnysz, all of which lie in the Kurpie region of Poland.

== See also ==
- Jednorożec
- Kurpie
