= Gmina Chorzele =

Gmina Chorzele Chorzele Commune
- Gmina
- Flag Coat of arms

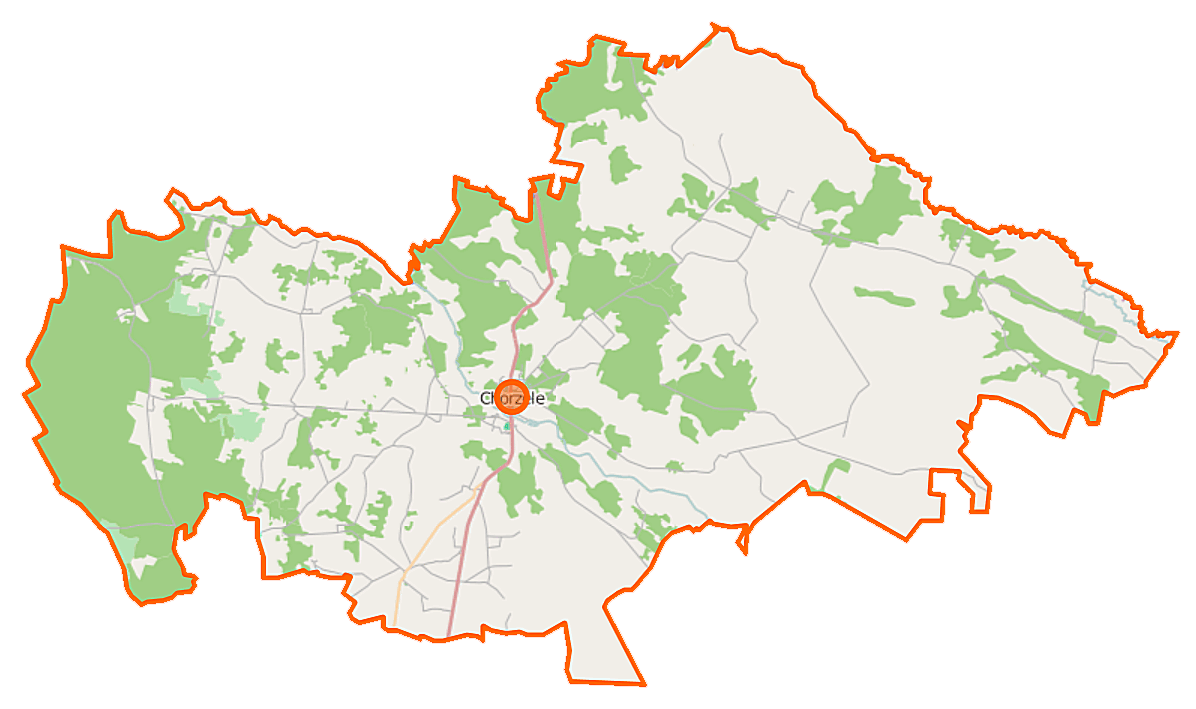
- Coordinates (Chorzele): 53°15′N 20°54′E
- Country: Poland
- Voivodeship: Masovian
- County: Przasnysz
- Seat: Chorzele

Area
  - Total: 371.53 km^{2} (143.45 sq mi)

Population (2013)
  - Total: 10,235
  - Density: 27.548/km^{2} (71.350/sq mi)
  - Urban: 2,939
  - Rural: 7,296
- Website: http://www.gminachorzele.pl/

Gmina Chorzele is an urban-rural gmina (administrative district) in Przasnysz County, Masovian Voivodeship, in east-central Poland. Its seat is the town of Chorzele, which lies approximately 26 kilometres (16 mi) north of Przasnysz and 115 km (71 mi) north of Warsaw.

The gmina covers an area of 371.53 square kilometres (143.4 sq mi), and as of 2006 its total population is 10,117 (out of which the population of Chorzele amounts to 2,783, and the population of the rural part of the gmina is 7,334).

== Villages ==
Apart from the town of Chorzele, Gmina Chorzele contains the villages and settlements of:

- Aleksandrowo
- Annowo
- Bagienice
- Binduga
- Bobry
- Bogdany Małe
- Bogdany Wielkie
- Brzeski-Kołaki
- Budki
- Bugzy Płoskie
- Bugzy-Jarki
- Bugzy-Święchy
- Czaplice Wielkie
- Czaplice-Furmany
- Czaplice-Piłaty
- Czarzaste Małe
- Czarzaste Wielkie
- Dąbrowa
- Dąbrówka Ostrowska
- Duczymin
- Dzierzęga-Nadbory
- Gadomiec-Chrzczany
- Gadomiec-Miłocięta
- Gadomiec-Peronie
- Grąd Rycicki
- Jarzynny Kierz
- Jedlinka
- Krukowo
- Krzynowłoga Wielka
- Kwiatkowo
- Łaz
- Łazy
- Lipowiec
- Liwki
- Mącice
- Niskie Wielkie
- Nowa Wieś koło Duczymina
- Nowa Wieś Zarębska
- Opaleniec
- Opiłki Płoskie
- Poścień-Wieś
- Poścień-Zamion
- Pruskołęka
- Przątalina
- Przysowy
- Rapaty-Górki
- Rapaty-Sulimy
- Rapaty-Żachy
- Raszujka
- Rawki
- Rembielin
- Rycice
- Rzodkiewnica
- Ścięciel
- Skuze
- Sosnówek
- Stara Wieś
- Wasiły-Zygny
- Wierzchowizna
- Wólka Zdziwójska
- Zagaty
- Zaręby
- Zdziwój Nowy
- Zdziwój Stary

== Neighbouring gminas ==
Gmina Chorzele is bordered by the gminas of Baranowo, Czarnia, Dzierzgowo, Janowo, Jednorożec, Krzynowłoga Mała and Wielbark.
