= Czernice Borowe =

- Village
- Location within Poland
- Coordinates: 53°1′53″N 20°43′7″E
- Country: Poland
- Voivodeship: Masovian
- County: Przasnysz
- Gmina: Czernice Borowe
- Population: 480

Czernice Borowe [t͡ʂɛrˈnit͡sɛ bɔˈrɔvɛ] is a village in Przasnysz County, Masovian Voivodeship, in east-central Poland. It is the seat of the gmina (administrative district) called Gmina Czernice Borowe.

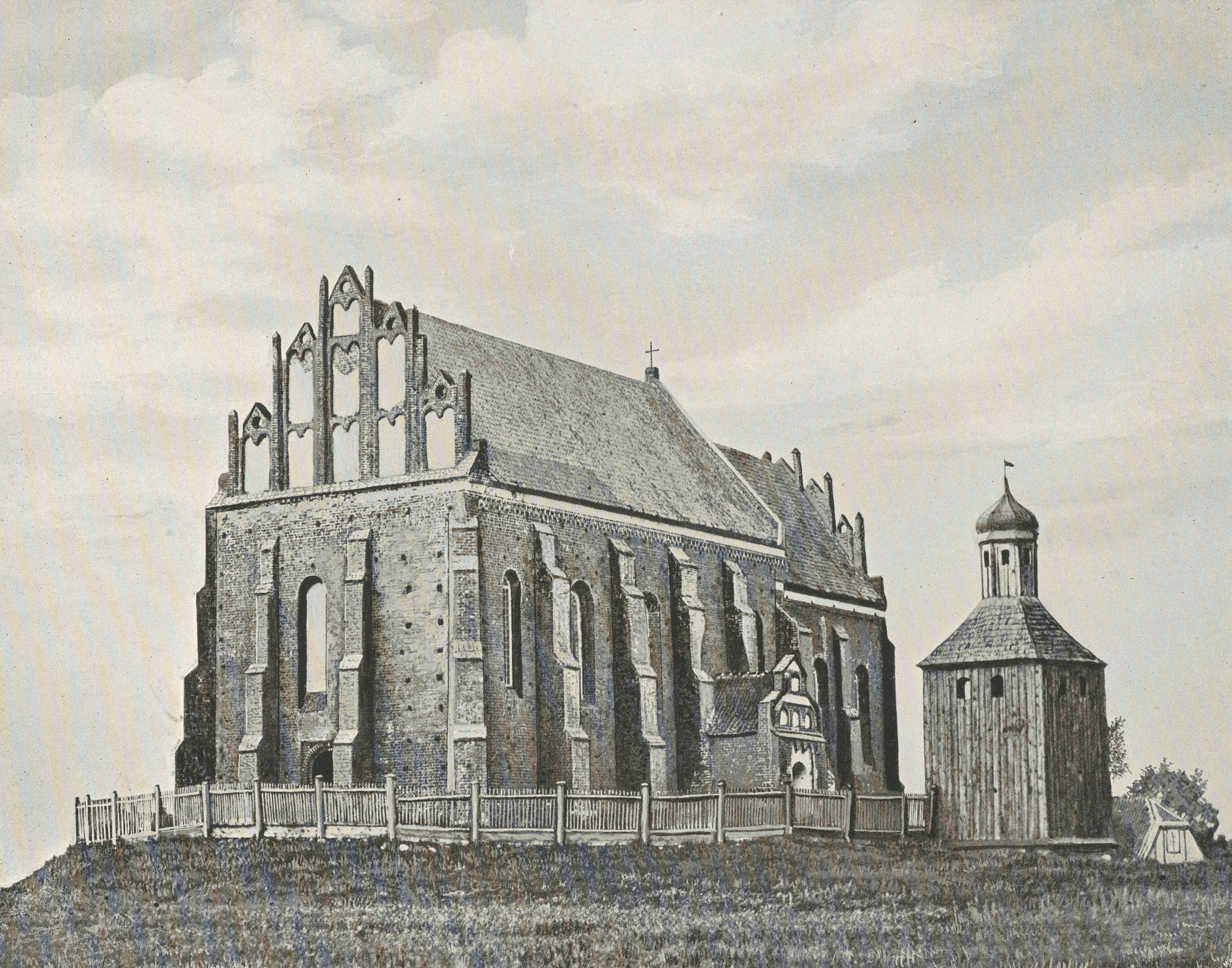
Church of Saint Achatius and the Companions of Martyrs, before 1899
