= Krzynowłoga Wielka =

- Village
- Location within Poland
- Coordinates: 53°13′N 20°51′E
- Country: Poland
- Voivodeship: Masovian
- County: Przasnysz
- Gmina: Chorzele

Krzynowłoga Wielka [kʂɨnɔˈvwɔɡa ˈvjɛlka] is a village in the administrative district of Gmina Chorzele, within Przasnysz County, Masovian Voivodeship, in east-central Poland.
