= Jednorożec =

- Village
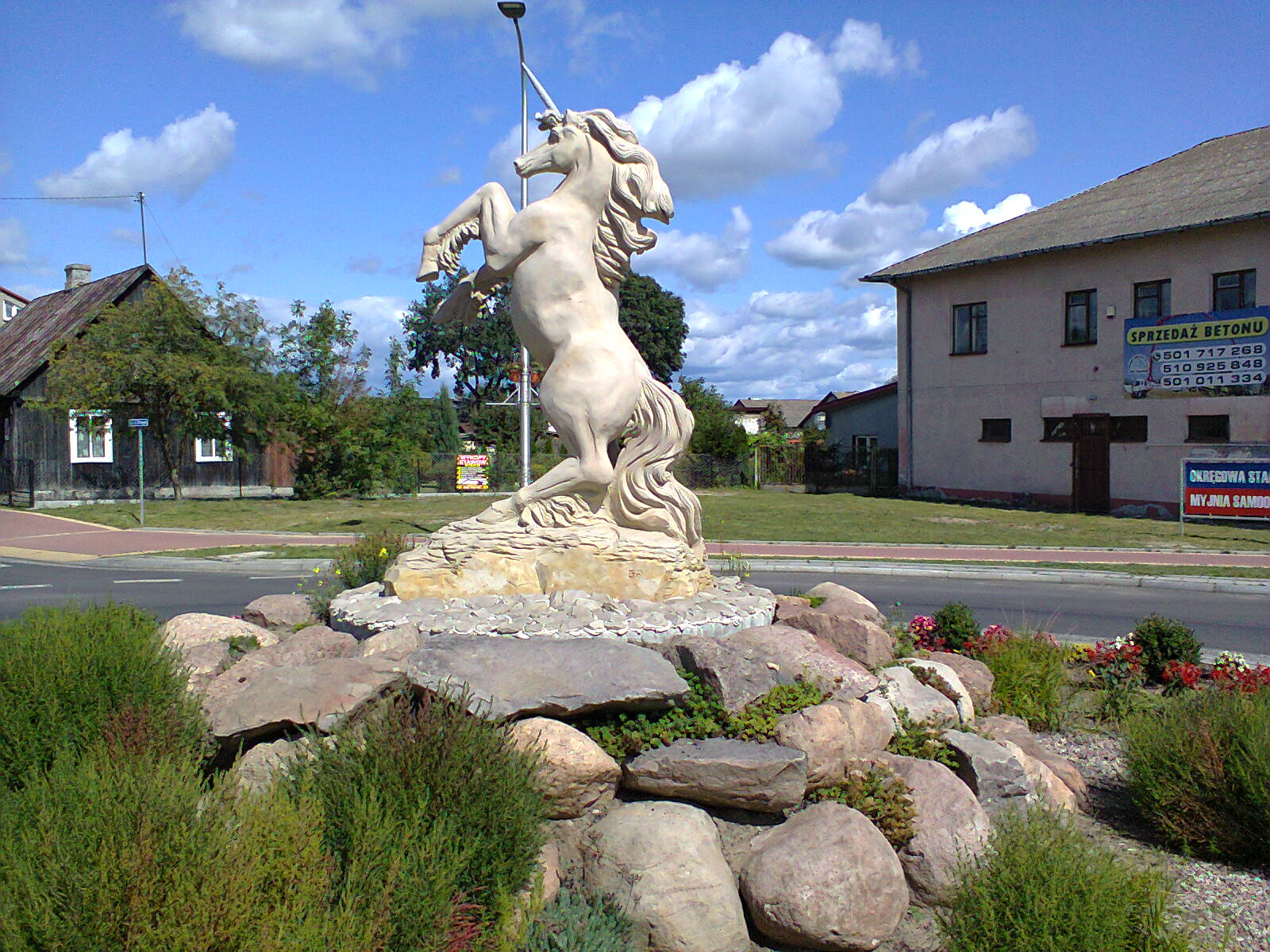
- Unicorn statue in Jednorożec

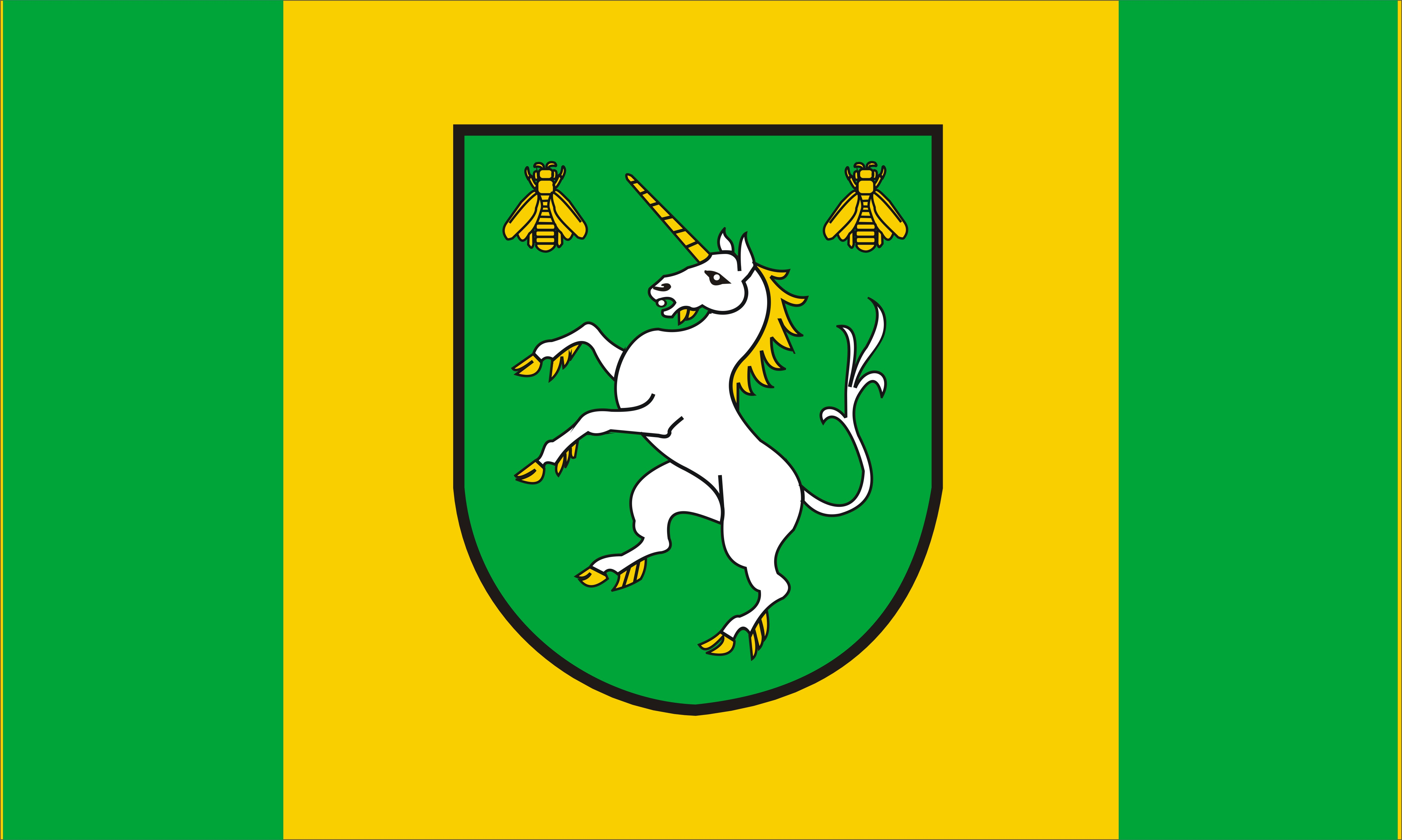
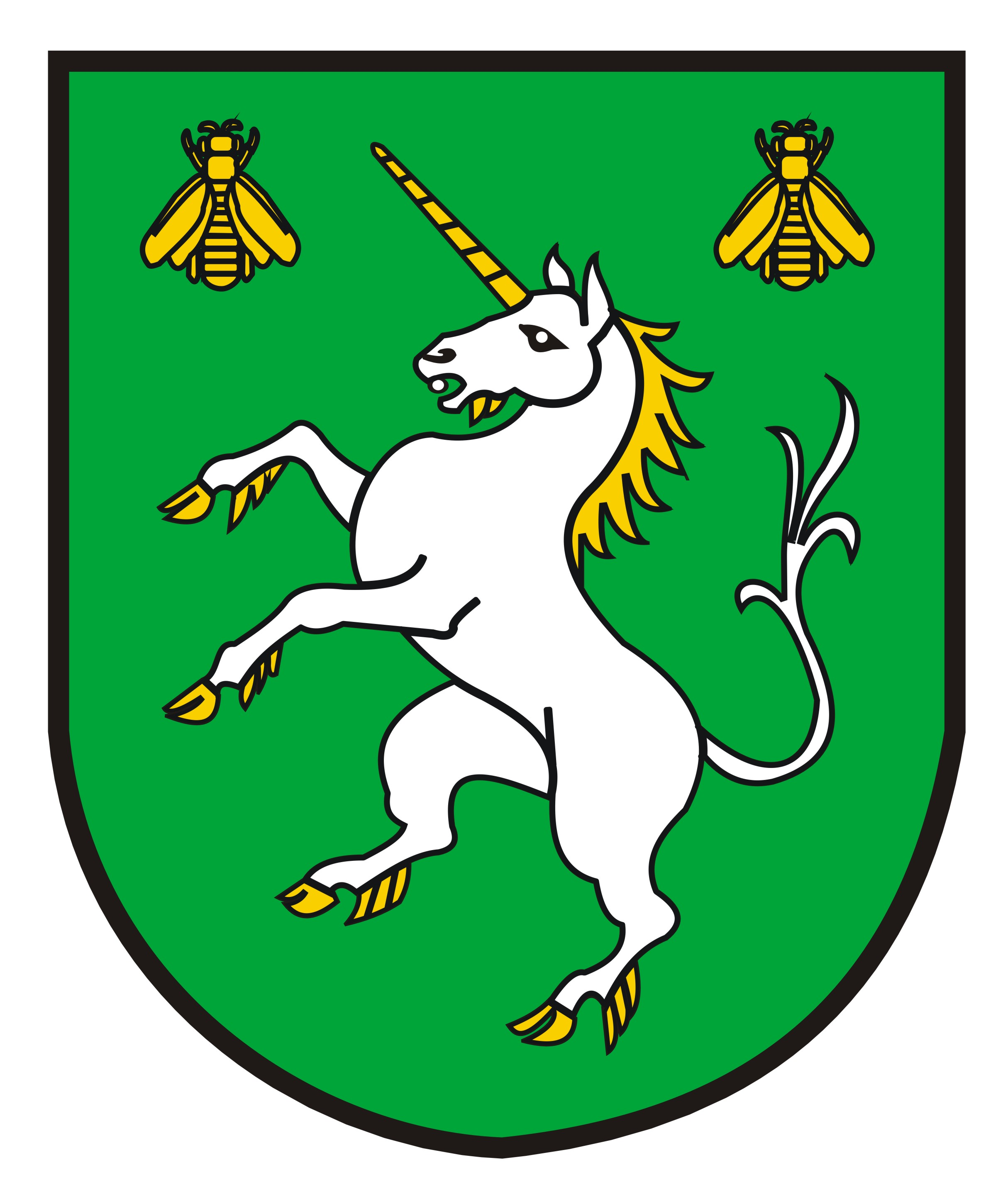
- Flag Coat of arms

- Location within Poland
- Coordinates: 53°8′N 21°3′E
- Country: Poland
- Voivodeship: Masovian
- Powiat: Przasnysz
- Gmina: Jednorożec

Population (2004)
  - Total: 1,800
- Time zone: UTC+1 (CET)
  - Summer (DST): UTC+2 (CEST)
- Postal code: 06-323
- Car plates: WPZ
- Website: www.jednorozec.pl

Jednorożec ([jɛdnɔˈrɔʐɛt͡s]) is a village in Przasnysz County, Mazovian Voivodeship, Poland. It is one of the centres of the ethnocultural region of Kurpie in the historic region of Masovia.

== Etymology ==
The village was named based on the local legend of a beekeeper who saw a unicorn in the area, which was at the time a royal hunting preserve. According to the legend, Duke Janusz III of Masovia ordered the building of a hunting lodge on the spot, which he named Jednorożec, meaning "unicorn."

The coat of arms and the municipal flag of Jednorożec consist of a unicorn accompanied by two bees. The unicorn is shown in the position of a Polish battle horse. The color green symbolizes the area's forested Kurpie past, as well as the current "green" values of the local inhabitants, and the green color also refers to the area as part of what was once "Poland's Green Lungs."

== Government ==
The village of Jednorożec is the seat of the Gmina Jednorożec (administrative district) in Przasnysz County.

The Jednorożec municipal office is located at ul. Odrodzenia 14, 06-323 Jednorożec.

Current departments include:

- Mayor
- Secretary
- Treasurer
- Finance and Budget Office
- Investment and Development Team
- Head of the Office of Civil Status
- Independent Workplace Affairs and Local Government Personnel
- Independent Position for Defense, Civil Protection and Economic Crisis Management
- Independent Workplace - Computer Science
- Stand-alone post for Land Reclamation
- Project Coordinator

== History ==
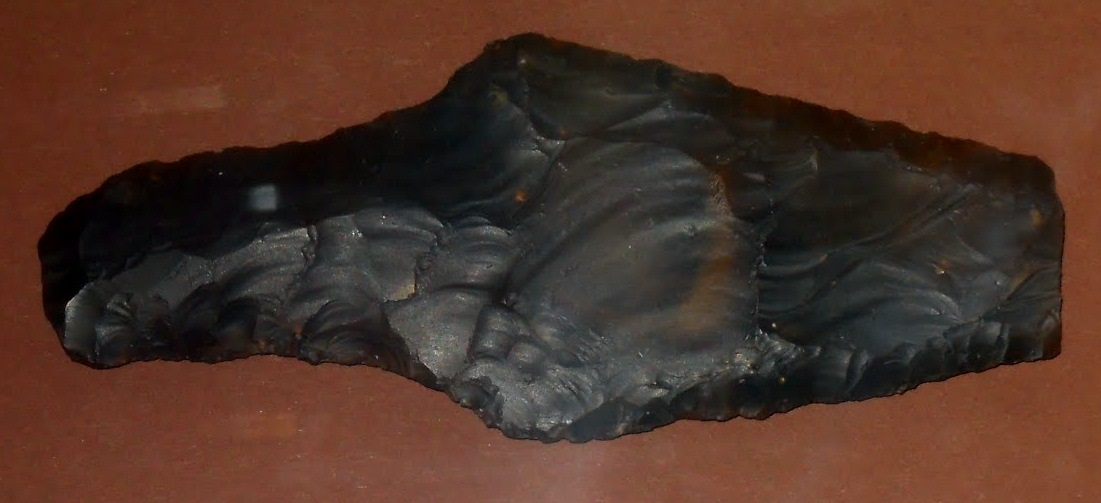
A Mierzanowice culture dagger found in Jednorożec

The area now known as Jednorożec was part of a royal estate in the Kurpie forest, and contained no permanent residents in the second half of the 16th century, only meadows and small huts of beekeepers. Beekeeping was highly regulated by law and beekeepers were required to provide "forty hands of honey" (40 rączek miodu) per year as tribute to the estate. In addition, they were required to pay the estate a rent and to serve as serfs for three days during harvest time. Nearby neighbors in Lipa and Małowidz, however, were required to serve as serfs three days a week.

Between 1609 and 1616 the heavily forested area was destroyed by violent storms and forest fires which put the beekeepers out of business. Beekeepers who suffered severe losses appealed to the royal court and were provided sixteen hectares of land, allowed the right to bear arms, and, along with settlers in Lipa and Małowidz, were removed from serfdom by the court. This special status and privilege, first started here, was later extended to other settlement areas in the Puszcza Zagajnica forest of Kurpie, and marked the beginning of agriculture in the area.

The Jednorożec settlement was officially incorporated as a village on August 7, 1650, by a decree from King John II Casimir Vasa, which allowed the beekeepers and farmers, who were already settled there, the official title to their land. Jednorożec survived the Swedish invasion of Poland during the Second Northern War in the mid-17th century. The village grew from approximately 40 families in the early 1700s to 80 families in 1781, and Jednorożec then became the second largest settlement of the parish, after Chorzele. A census in 1827 indicated the village's population was 693 inhabitants housed in 111 homes.

A resolution of the Duchy of Warsaw, dated March 12, 1808, allowed the creation of parochial schooling in Jednorożec, and, in 1809, the first school opened in the village in an old building. A newly built school was funded and established in 1817, and the teacher, John Krajewski, received 300 złoty a year, plus contributions. School attendance was low and often interrupted by the children having to remain at home to help with farm chores.

During the November Uprising and the January Uprising of the years 1863–1864, many of the young men of the village joined the insurgency. During the January Uprising, the surrounding forests provided shelter to the insurgents. It is in this area, near Drążdżewo, the commander of the insurgents hid Zygmunt Padlewski with his division after Padlewski's defeat at Myszyniec. Russian czarist troops moved into the area, and a battle was fought which resulted in Padlewski losing the battle with 50 of his insurgents killed in action or drowned while escaping.

In 1867 a gmina (commune) was established with Jednorożec as its seat. Gmina Jednorożec contained 586 houses and 4,376 inhabitants (in 1882) and was contained within an area of 35,391 hectares. In the Jednorożec gmina were the chapel, the office of the municipality, the municipal court, post border guards, forestry office, four tar factories, three windmills, and two inns.

The village prospered well until the middle of the 19th century when natural disasters (drought, fire, hailstones) and resultant soil depletion caused an economic crisis. In addition, on May 18, 1848, a fire, initially caused by lightning, burned down 80 houses and injured 50 people. The economic situation became so desperate the church urged parishioners to "cease drinking vodka." Education suffered during this period of Russian czarist occupation when the Jednorożec school was directed to teach all courses in the Russian language, which was strongly resented and opposed by the villagers. In addition, since villagers now had not the money to pay for school tuition, attendance fell to twenty percent by 1890. In 1889, Jednorożec contained around 118 farms and there were also 45 families with no land. In 1890 villagers refused to pay taxes, which resulted in the arrival of Russian troops to collect taxes by force.

Severe economic hardship continued through the end of the 19th century, causing many of the inhabitants to emigrate to the United States or to seek seasonal work in Prussia.

=== 20th century ===
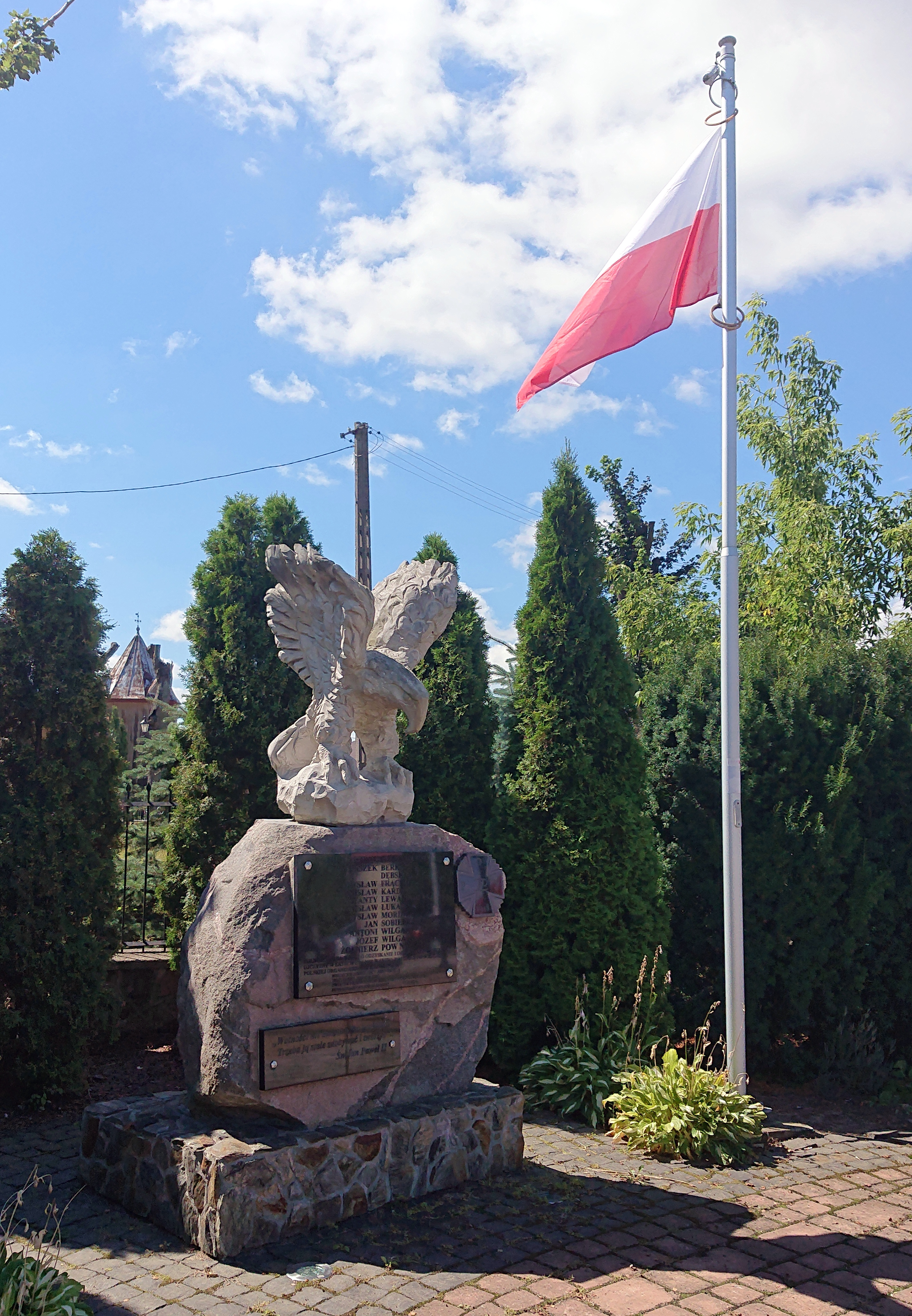
Polish Military Organisation Monument in Jednorożec

When World War I occurred, inhabitants of Jednorożec and nearby villages in the gmina were displaced and in turmoil in November and December 1914 when Germans and Russians fought fierce battles near Przasnysz. Many fled to nearby settlements or hid in the woods until the fighting was over. Another fight broke out in early spring 1915. Until then, Jednorożec was occupied by Tsarist troops. German forces attacked on Feb. 17, 1915 in the direction of Jednorożec with the objective of attacking Przasnysz. As a result of heavy fighting on 24 February Przasnysz was captured, but soon the Russians went into a counteroffensive, but were not able to oust the Germans from the area. In early March, when the Russians attacked the Germans, Jednorożec was on the front lines and, by March 1915, more than half of the village was destroyed. A Polish resistance group, called "Polish Military Organisation" (Polska Organizacja Wojskowa) was formed during the war and included a number of the village's residents, including Franciszek Berk, Stanisław Kardaś, Władysław Mordwa, Jan Sobieraj, Antoni Wilga and Józef Wilga.

When, in August 1915 residents began returning to Jednorożec, which was now under German occupation until 1918, there were only three remaining buildings: the parsonage, a house and a granary. Inhabitants were dying of starvation, and efforts were made to reconstruct the village. Peace eventually returned to the area until August 1920, when, for a few days, the area was occupied by Soviet troops.

Residents quickly rebuilt after the devastation of the village in 1914–1915. Jednorożec in the interwar period once again became economically strong and a thriving village with 160 houses and 869 inhabitants. All were of Polish nationality and observed the Catholic faith.

A monument on the main street in village is dedicated to all those who emigrated from the village to America during the mass emigration period of 1870–1910.

Following the German-Soviet invasion of Poland, which started World War II in September 1939, the village was occupied by Germany. 46 Polish citizens were murdered by Nazi Germany in the village during World War II.

=== Today ===
Modern Jednorożec is largely agricultural. Today, residents in the village live in new homes alongside refurbished and preserved older homes.

Historic sites, monuments and buildings are well preserved by the residents, and the nearby cemetery is well-tended.

Celebrants during the 2001 festival

In June 2001 a festival was held to celebrate the 300th anniversary of some of the village's families whose Jednorożec roots were traced back to 1701. The celebration was attended, not only by the local residents, but by Jednorożec descendants from America who came to pay honor to their heritage.

== Historic Jednorożec families ==
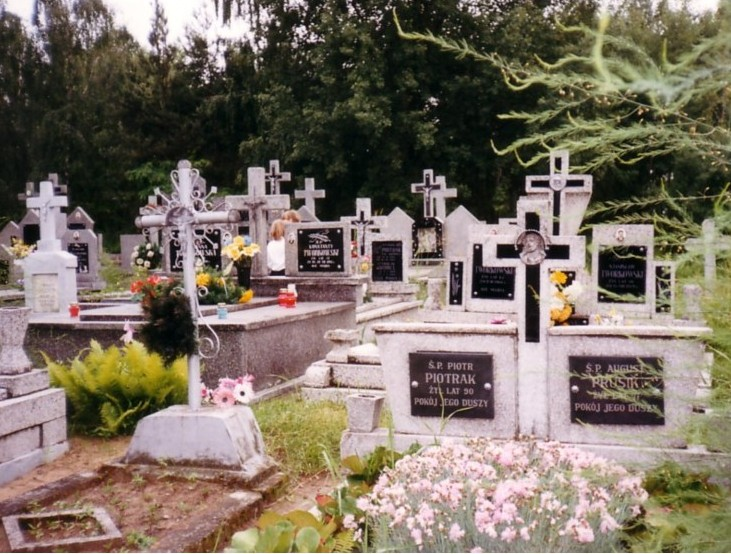
Honoring Jednorożec ancestors

Family surnames of those born in Jednorożec during the period 1700 to 1890 include:

Antosiak, Bakula, Berk, Bilek, Bitkiem, Blaszkiewicz, Bolinski, Cesarz, Chudzik, Deptula, Duda, Dybinski, Forman, Frontczak, Giardow, Godlewski, Grabowski, Gwiazda, Jozwik, Kardas, Kiec, Kieszczyk, Krajewski, Krawczyk, Krulak, Kuligowski, Kulpan, Kuta, Maka, Maluchnik, Matusiak, Matwicki, Merchel, Mordwa, Mortwionek, Nowotka, Nowotkow, Obrebski, Olender, Opalach, Orzol, Ososki, Pazdrag, Piorkowski, Piotrak, Podym, Pogorzelski, Prusik, Przybylek, Przybytek, Renof, Rykoski, Sasin, Sedrowski, Sidwa, Sierpienski, Sobieraj, Sobiski, Sopech, Stancel, Stefaniak, Suchowiecki, Symolon, Szczepanik, Szewczyk, Szlaga, Sztambor, Wilga, Wroblow, Zaleski, Zokewski, Zygmunt.

== Churches ==
Church of the Assumption of the Blessed Virgin Mary

Four churches located in Jednorożec serve the Catholic population of the village and surrounding areas:

- Christ Redeemer, Polon 74
- Saint Anthony, Olszewka 79
- Saint Florian, ul. Koscielna 1 A
- Saint Stanislaus Bishop and Martyr, Parciaki 28

== Local newspapers and publications ==
- Głos Gminy Jednorożec
- Źródła do dziejów Ziemi Jednorożeckiej
- Słowa najprostsze
