= Przasnysz County =

Przasnysz County Powiat przasnyski
- County
- Flag Coat of arms

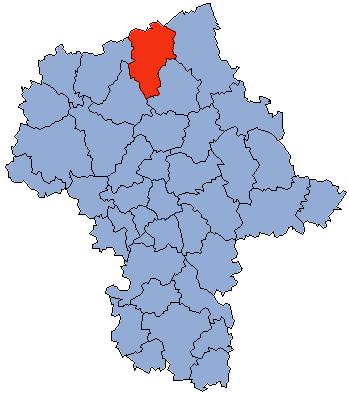
- Location within the voivodeship

- Division into gminas
- Coordinates (Przasnysz): 53°1′N 20°53′E
- Country: Poland
- Voivodeship: Masovian
- Seat: Przasnysz
- Gminas: Total 7 (incl. 1 urban): Przasnysz; Gmina Chorzele; Gmina Czernice Borowe; Gmina Jednorożec; Gmina Krasne; Gmina Krzynowłoga Mała; Gmina Przasnysz

Area
  - Total: 1,217.82 km^{2} (470.20 sq mi)

Population (2019)
  - Total: 52,676
  - Density: 43.254/km^{2} (112.03/sq mi)
  - Urban: 20,352
  - Rural: 32,324
- Car plates: WPZ
- Website: www.powiat-przasnysz.pl

Przasnysz County (Polish: powiat przasnyski) is a unit of territorial administration and local government (powiat) in Masovian Voivodeship, east-central Poland. It came into being on 1 January 1999, as a result of the Polish local government reforms passed in 1998. Its administrative seat and largest town is Przasnysz, which lies 90 kilometres (56 mi) north of Warsaw. The only other town in the county is Chorzele, lying 26 km (16 mi) north of Przasnysz. The county covers an area of 1,217.82 square kilometres (470.2 sq mi). As of 2019, its total population is 52,616, out of which the population of Przasnysz is 17,264, that of Chorzele is 3,088, and the rural population is 32,324.

== Neighbouring counties ==
Przasnysz County is bordered by Szczytno County to the north, Ostrołęka County to the east, Maków County to the south-east, Ciechanów County to the south-west, Mława County to the west and Nidzica County to the north-west.

== Administrative divisions ==
The county is subdivided into seven gminas (one urban, one urban-rural and five rural). These are listed in the following table, in descending order of population.

Gmina	Type	Area (km^{2})	Population (2019)	Seat
Przasnysz	urban	25.2	17,264	
Gmina Chorzele	urban-rural	371.5	10,181	Chorzele
Gmina Przasnysz	rural	183.9	7,225	Przasnysz *
Gmina Jednorożec	rural	231.6	7,139	Jednorożec
Gmina Czernice Borowe	rural	120.3	3,783	Czernice Borowe
Gmina Krasne	rural	100.9	3,636	Krasne
Gmina Krzynowłoga Mała	rural	184.4	3,448	Krzynowłoga Mała
* seat not part of the gmina
