= Aleksander Kakowski =

Polish politician, diplomat, Cardinal and Archbishop

His Eminence Aleksander Kakowski
- Cardinal, Archbishop of Warsaw
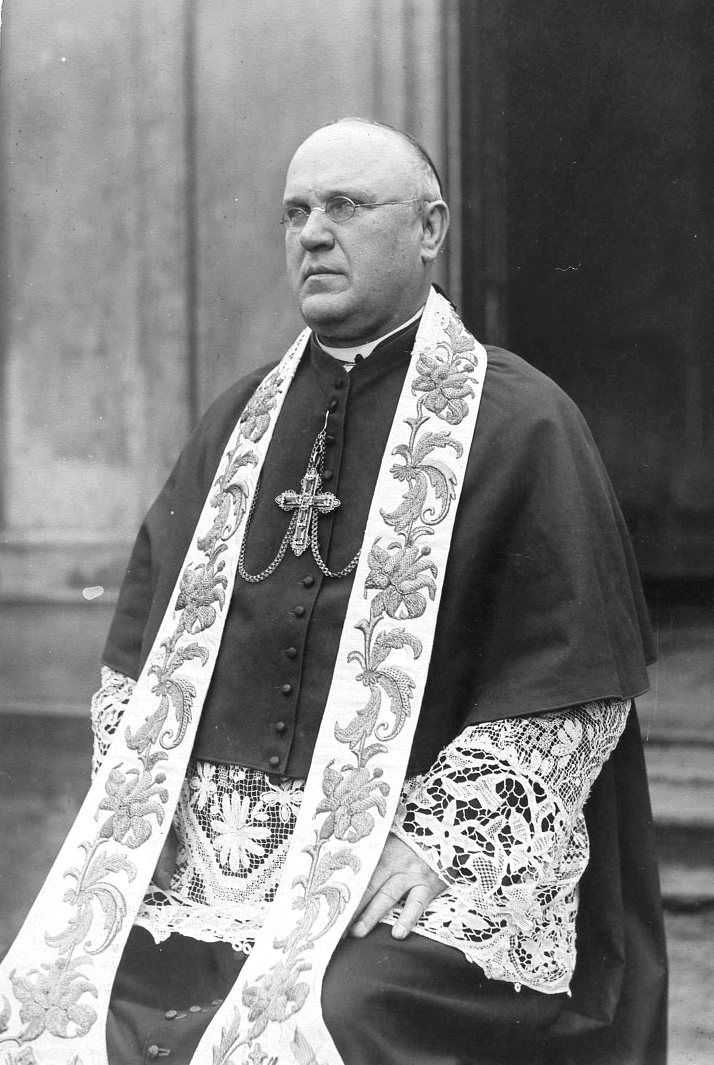
- Church: Catholic Church
- Archdiocese: Warsaw
- Appointed: 7 May 1913
- In office: 1913-1938
- Predecessor: Wincenty Teofil Popiel
- Successor: August Hlond
- Other post: Cardinal-Priest of Sant’Agostino

Orders
- Ordination: 30 May 1886
- Consecration: 22 June 1913 by Stanisław Kazimierz Zdzitowiecki
- Created cardinal: 15 December 1919 by Benedict XV
- Rank: Cardinal-Priest

Personal details
- Born: 5 February 1862 Dębiny, Płock Governorate, Congress Poland
- Died: 30 December 1938 (aged 76)
- Motto: Operare sperare

- Coat of arms

Aleksander Kakowski (Polish pronunciation: [alɛˈksandɛr kaˈkɔfskʲi]; 5 February 1862 – 30 December 1938) was a Polish politician, diplomat, a member of the Regency Council and, as Cardinal and Archbishop of Warsaw, the last titular Primate of the Kingdom of Poland before Poland fully regained its independence in 1918.

== Early life ==
He was born on 5 February 1862 in Dębiny near Przasnysz, the son of Franciszek Kakowski and Paulina Ossowska. He was ordained a priest on 30 May 1886 in Warsaw, by Cardinal Wincenty Chościak-Popiel. The following year he became one of the professors at the Warsaw Theological Seminary. In 1910 he became Rector of the Saint Petersburg Roman Catholic Theological Academy, and on 22 July 1913 he was ordained a bishop by Stanisław Zdzitowiecki. On 14 September 1913 he became the archbishop of Warsaw in St. John's Cathedral, thus becoming the titular primate of the Kingdom of Poland.

== World War I and the Regency Council ==
After the outbreak of World War I, he remained in Warsaw and in 1917, he was appointed to be a member of the Regency Council, a semi-independent and temporary highest authority of the Kingdom of Poland, recreated by the Central Powers as part of their Mitteleuropa plan. Kakowski was one of three members of that body, which served as a provisional head of state (hence the word "regency" in its name).

== Relations with Rome ==
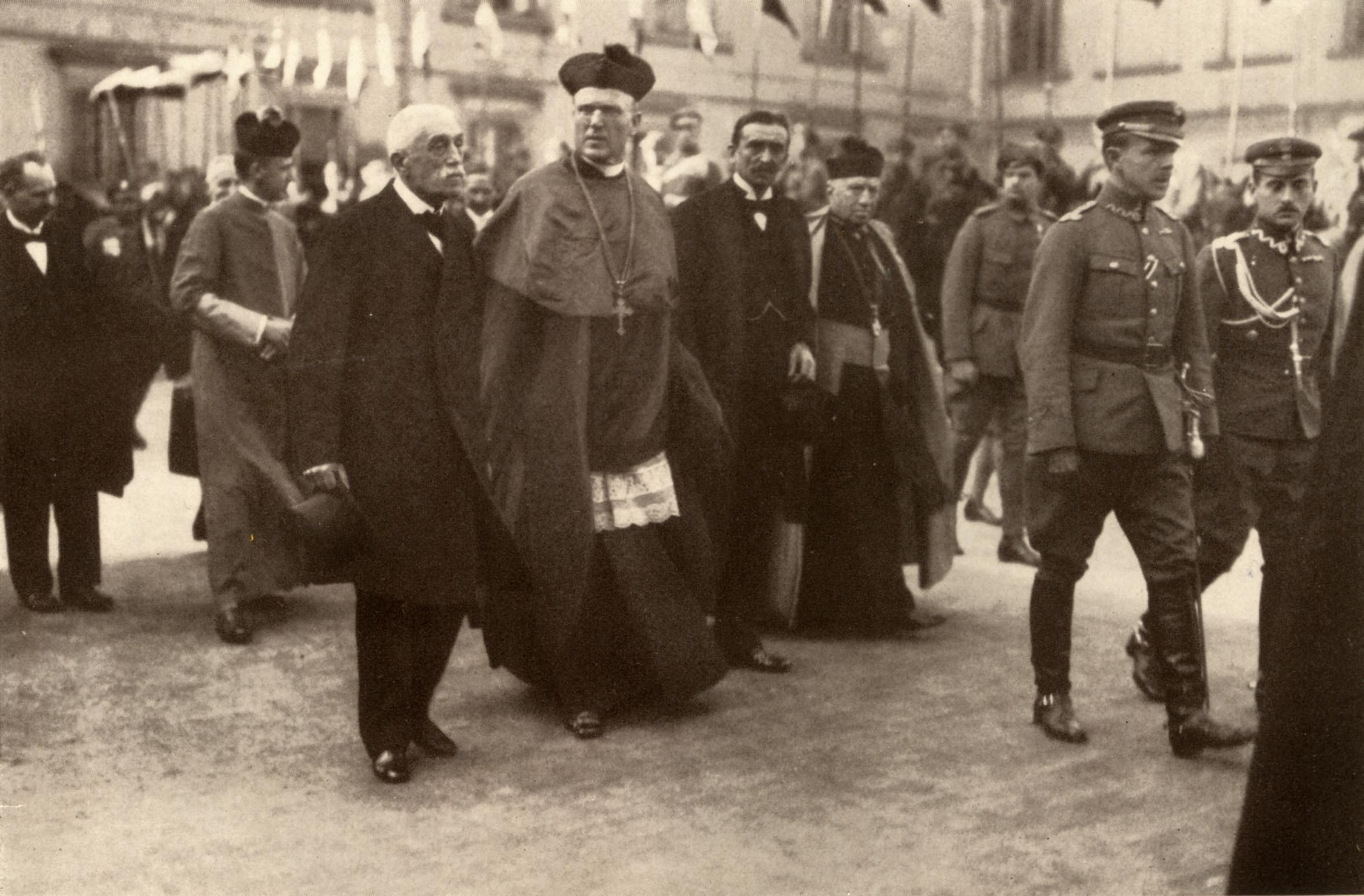
Archbishop Kakowski with other members of the Regency Council in 1917

On 28 November 1919, he was the main consecrator of Achille Ratti, the papal nuncio to Poland who later became Pope Pius XI. On 15 December, Kakowski himself was made a cardinal. During his service as the Archbishop of Warsaw, Kakowski promoted the creation of a strong Catholic press. He was one of the authors of the success of Rycerz Niepokalanej, one of the most popular newspapers in prewar Poland. He was also the main creator of the theological faculty at the Warsaw University and of the Catholic Action movement. For his role in liberating Poland from foreign occupation, he was awarded the Order of the White Eagle, the highest Polish decoration, in 1925; in July 1938, he even briefly appeared as the head of that order's chapter. In 1930, he also became a "bailiff of honour and devotion" of the Order of St John of Jerusalem. His successor, August Hlond, was to reintroduce the title of Primate of Poland after the Second World War, but Kakowski continued to style himself Primate of the Kingdom of Poland until his death, on 30 December 1938.

Catholic Church titles
| Preceded by Wincenty Chościak-Popiel | Archbishop of Warsaw; 1913-1938 | Succeeded by August Hlond |
| Preceded by Jan Paweł Woronicz | Primate of Poland; 1916-1938 | Succeeded by none |
| Preceded by Sebastiano Martinelli | Cardinal Priest of Sant'Agostino; 1919-1938 | Succeeded by Agustín Parrado y García |
