= Stanisław Kazimierz Zdzitowiecki =

Polish Roman Catholic bishop

- Bishop of Włocławek
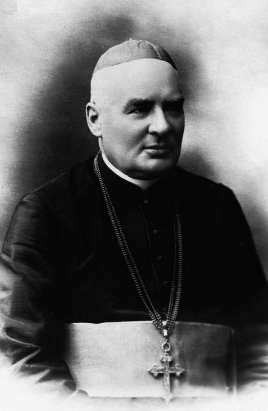
- Appointed: 9 June 1902
- Predecessor: Aleksander Kazimierz Bereśniewicz
- Successor: Władysław Paweł Krynicki

Orders
- Ordination: 23 July 1877 by Wincenty Teofil Popiel
- Consecration: 23 November 1902 by Jerzy Józef Szembek

Personal details
- Born: 12 February 1854; Barczkowice
- Died: 11 February 1927 (aged 72)

Stanisław Kazimierz Zdzitowiecki (12 February 1854 – 11 February 1927) was a bishop of Włocławek from 1902 to 1927.

== Biography ==
Zdzitowiecki was born to Wincent and Julia Zdzitowiecki (née Parska) in 1854 in Barczkowice. After completing school in Piotrków, he began to attend the seminary in Warsaw in 1872. He was ordained a priest on 23 July 1877 by Wincenty Teofil Popiel, Archbishop of Warsaw.

After working as a priest in various parishes in the Archdiocese of Warsaw, Zdzitowiecki was sent to Rome, where he obtained a doctorate from the Pontifical Gregorian University in 1882. He was later assigned to work under the bishop of Sandomierz, Antoni Ksawery Sotkiewicz. While working under Sotkiewicz, Zdzitowiecki was chancellor of the diocesan curia of the Diocese of Sandomierz and a professor at the diocesan seminary located there. He was also appointed a canon of the cathedral chapter of Sandomierz. Upon the death of Sotkiewicz, he was made diocesan administrator of the Diocese of Sandomierz.

On 9 June 1902, Zdzitowiecki was appointed Bishop of Kujawy-Kaliska by Leo XIII; he was consecrated on 23 November 1902 in St. Petersburg by Jerzy Józef Szembek and had his ingress in December the same year. During his tenure as bishop, Pius X – at Zdzitowiecki's request – granted Włocławek Cathedral the title of minor basilica in 1909. He died in 1927 and was buried in Włocławek Cathedral.
