= Aleksander Kazimierz Bereśniewicz =

Roman Catholic bishop (1823 – 1902)

- Bishop of Kujawy-Kaliska
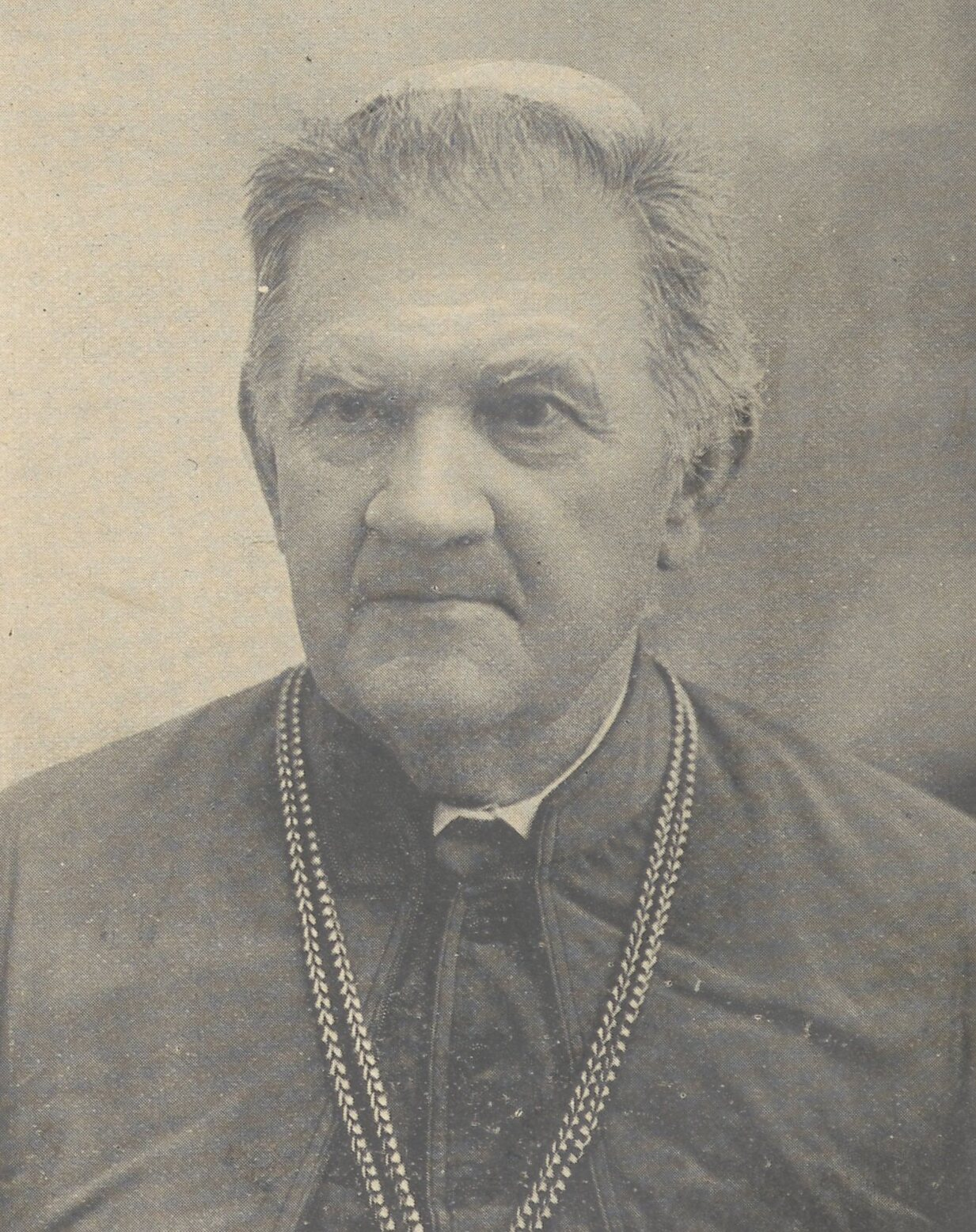
- Appointed: 15 March 1882
- Predecessor: Wincenty Teofil Popiel
- Successor: Stanisław Kazimierz Zdzitowiecki
- Previous posts: Apostolic administrator of Samogitia (1875 – 1883); Auxiliary bishop of Samogitia (1858 – 1875); Titular bishop of Maximianopolis (1858 – 1875)

Orders
- Ordination: 10 September 1847
- Consecration: 27 February 1859 by Wacław Żyliński

Personal details
- Born: 16 June 1823 Szwelnia
- Died: 4 June 1902 (aged 78) Włocławek

Aleksander Kazimierz Bereśniewicz (16 June 1823 – 4 June 1902) was a Roman Catholic bishop of the Diocese of Kujawy-Kaliska from 1882 to 1902.

== Biography ==
Bereśniewicz was born in Szwelnia. When he was 10 years old, he began his education with the Bernardines in Dotnuva. He was later educated at Kėdainiai. In 1839, he began attending the diocesan seminary of the Diocese of Samogitia, located in Varniai. He first learnt theology at the theological academy in Vilnius, transferring to Saint Petersburg Roman Catholic Theological Academy in 1842. After obtaining a magister degree in theology, he was appointed a professor of dogmatic theology and of the Latin language for the diocesan seminary at Varniai on 16 September 1845. He was ordained a priest on 10 September 1847.

In 1850, Bereśniewicz was appointed regent of the diocesan seminary in Varniai. He moved to Vilnius in 1853 at the request of the Russian government, where he was made the prefect of a school. He was appointed auxiliary bishop of the Diocese of Samogitia and titular bishop of Maximianopolis by Pope Pius IX in 1858; he was consecrated on 27 February 1859 in St. Petersburg by Wacław Żyliński. He served as rector of the Saint Petersburg Roman Catholic Theological Academy between 1860 and 1864, and was appointed vicar capitular of the Diocese of Samogitia in 1875.

Bereśniewicz was appointed bishop of the Diocese of Kujawy-Kaliska on 15 March 1882. He assumed control of the diocese on 1 July 1883. During his tenure as bishop of Kujawy-Kaliska, he rebuilt the diocesan seminary and helped to renovate the cathedral in Włocławek. On 8 March 1897, Pope Leo XIII appointed Bereśniewicz a prelate of the papal household and an assistant to the papal throne. He resigned as bishop of Kujawy-Kaliska on 15 March 1902 and died in Włocławek on 4 June of the same year. He was buried at the cathedral in Włocławek.
