= Karwacki =

Karwacki (feminine: Karwacka; plural: Karwaccy) is a surname of Polish language origin. People with this surname include:

- David Karwacki (born 1965), Canadian politician
- Krysten Karwacki (born 1991), Canadian curler
- Marlena Karwacka (born 1997), Polish racing cyclist
- Robert L. Karwacki (1933–2014), justice of the Maryland Court of Appeals

== See also ==
- Wyrąb Karwacki, a village in the administrative district of Gmina Przasnysz, within Przasnysz County, Masovian Voivodeship, Poland
