= Dębiny, Przasnysz County =

Dębiny
- Village
- Location within Poland
- Coordinates: 53°3′20″N 20°59′39″E
- Country: Poland
- Voivodeship: Masovian
- County: Przasnysz
- Gmina: Przasnysz
- Population: 90

Dębiny [dɛmˈbinɨ] is a village in the administrative district of Gmina Przasnysz, within Przasnysz County, Masovian Voivodeship, in east-central Poland.

In 2005 the village had a population of 90.

Cardinal Aleksander Kakowski was born here.
