= Oględa =

- Village
- Location within Poland
- Coordinates: 53°5′N 20°53′E
- Country: Poland
- Voivodeship: Masovian
- County: Przasnysz
- Gmina: Przasnysz

Oględa [ɔˈɡlɛnda] is a village in the administrative district of Gmina Przasnysz, within Przasnysz County, Masovian Voivodeship, in east-central Poland.
