= Święte Miejsce, Masovian Voivodeship =

Święte Miejsce
- Village
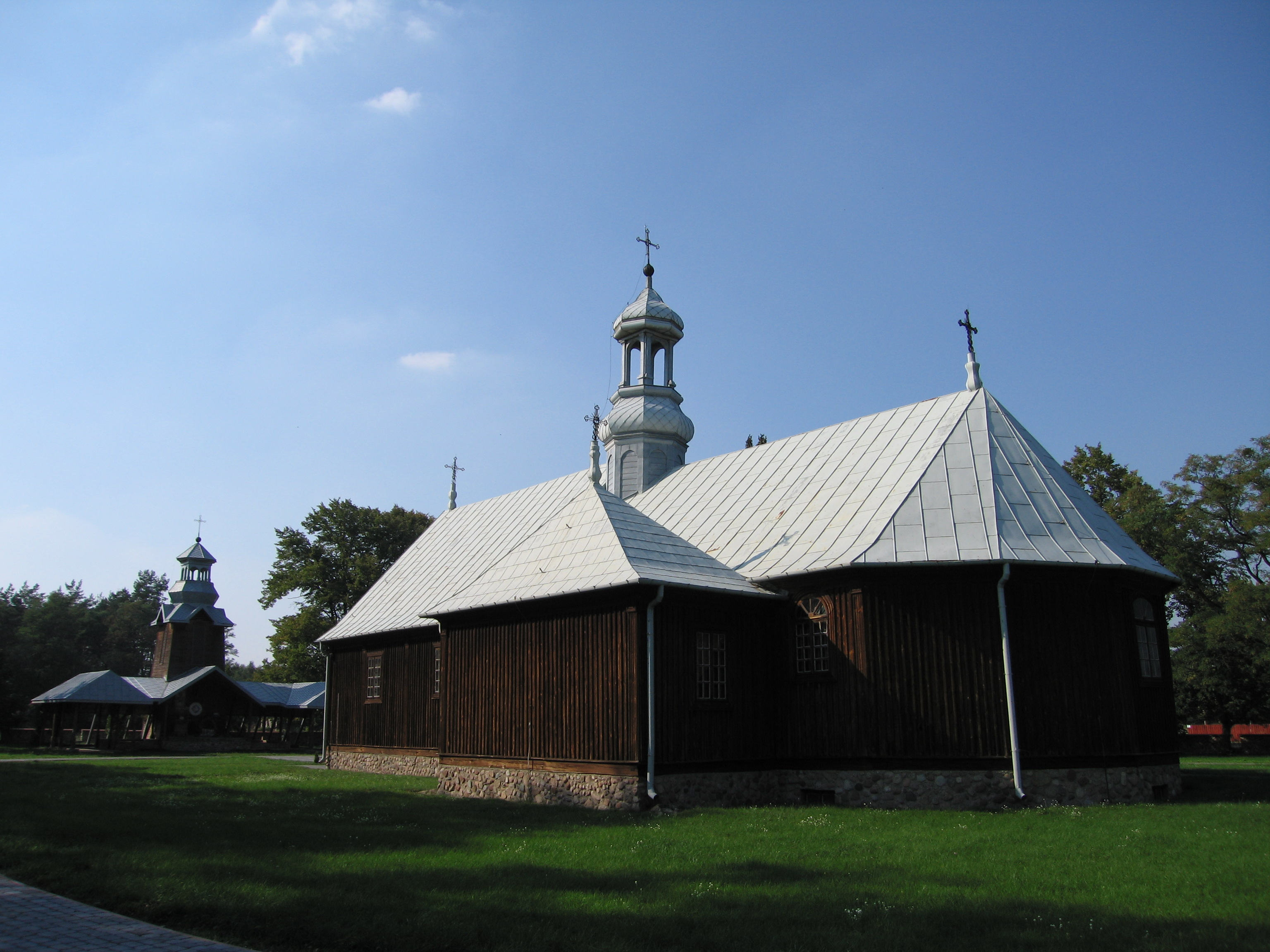
- Church of the Nativity of the Virgin Mary

- Location within Poland
- Coordinates: 53°3′12″N 20°57′59″E
- Country: Poland
- Voivodeship: Masovian
- County: Przasnysz
- Gmina: Przasnysz

Population
  - Total: 11

Święte Miejsce (Polish pronunciation: [ˈɕfjɛntɛ ˈmjɛjst͡sɛ]) is a village in the administrative district of Gmina Przasnysz, within Przasnysz County, Masovian Voivodeship, in east-central Poland.
