= Karwacz, Masovian Voivodeship =

Karwacz
- Village
- Location within Poland
- Coordinates: 53°0′32″N 20°57′29″E
- Country: Poland
- Voivodeship: Masovian
- County: Przasnysz
- Gmina: Przasnysz

Karwacz [ˈkarvat͡ʂ] is a village in the administrative district of Gmina Przasnysz, within Przasnysz County, Masovian Voivodeship, in east-central Poland.
