= Polny Młyn =

- Village
- Location within Poland
- Coordinates: 53°02′12″N 20°56′06″E
- Country: Poland
- Voivodeship: Masovian
- County: Przasnysz
- Gmina: Przasnysz

Polny Młyn [ˈpɔlnɨ ˈmwɨn] is a village in the administrative district of Gmina Przasnysz, within Przasnysz County, Masovian Voivodeship, in east-central Poland.
