= Brzezice, Masovian Voivodeship =

Brzezice
- Settlement
- Location within Poland
- Coordinates: 53°3′6″N 20°51′57″E
- Country: Poland
- Voivodeship: Masovian
- County: Przasnysz
- Gmina: Przasnysz

Brzezice [bʐɛˈʑit͡sɛ] is a settlement in the administrative district of Gmina Przasnysz, within Przasnysz County, Masovian Voivodeship, in east-central Poland.
