= Gmina Przasnysz =

Gmina Przasnysz Przasnysz Commune
- Gmina
- Coat of arms
- Interactive map of Gmina Przasnysz
- Coordinates (Przasnysz): 53°1′N 20°53′E
- Country: Poland
- Voivodeship: Masovian
- County: Przasnysz
- Seat: Przasnysz

Area
  - Total: 183.91 km^{2} (71.01 sq mi)

Population (2013)
  - Total: 7,351
  - Density: 39.97/km^{2} (103.5/sq mi)
- Website: http://www.przasnysz.pl/

Gmina Przasnysz is a rural gmina (administrative district) in Przasnysz County, Masovian Voivodeship, in east-central Poland. Its seat is the town of Przasnysz, although the town is not part of the territory of the gmina.

The gmina covers an area of 183.91 square kilometres (71.0 sq mi), and as of 2006 its total population is 7,165 (7,351 in 2013).

== Villages ==
Gmina Przasnysz contains the villages and settlements of Annopol, Bartniki, Bogate, Brzezice, Cegielnia, Cierpigórz, Dębiny, Dobrzankowo, Emowo, Fijałkowo, Frankowo, Golany, Góry Karwackie, Gostkowo, Grabowo, Helenowo-Gadomiec, Janin, Józefowo, Karbówko, Karwacz, Kijewice, Klewki, Księstwo, Leszno, Lisiogóra, Mchówko, Mchowo, Mirów, Nowa Krępa, Nowe Helenowo, Obrąb, Oględa, Osówiec Kmiecy, Osówiec Szlachecki, Patołęka, Polny Młyn, Sątrzaska, Sierakowo, Stara Krępa, Stare Helenowo, Święte Miejsce, Szla, Trzcianka, Wandolin, Wielodróż, Wygoda, Wyrąb Karwacki, Zakocie and Zawadki.

== Neighbouring gminas ==
Gmina Przasnysz is bordered by the town of Przasnysz and by the gminas of Czernice Borowe, Jednorożec, Krasne, Krzynowłoga Mała and Płoniawy-Bramura.
