= Osówiec Szlachecki =

- Village
- Location within Poland
- Coordinates: 53°05′00″N 20°56′00″E
- Country: Poland
- Voivodeship: Masovian
- County: Przasnysz
- Gmina: Przasnysz

Osówiec Szlachecki (Polish pronunciation: [ɔˈsuvjɛts ʂlaˈxɛtskʲi]) is a village in the administrative district of Gmina Przasnysz, within Przasnysz County, Masovian Voivodeship, in east-central Poland.
