= Mchowo, Masovian Voivodeship =

Mchowo
- Village
- Location within Poland
- Coordinates: 53°4′5″N 20°51′39″E
- Country: Poland
- Voivodeship: Masovian
- County: Przasnysz
- Gmina: Przasnysz

Mchowo [ˈmxɔvɔ] is a village in the administrative district of Gmina Przasnysz, within Przasnysz County, Masovian Voivodeship, in east-central Poland.
