= Cegielnia, Przasnysz County =

Cegielnia
- Village
- Location within Poland
- Coordinates: 53°3′7″N 20°57′11″E
- Country: Poland
- Voivodeship: Masovian
- County: Przasnysz
- Gmina: Przasnysz
- Population: 50

Cegielnia [t͡sɛˈɡʲɛlɲa] is a village in the administrative district of Gmina Przasnysz, within Przasnysz County, Masovian Voivodeship, in east-central Poland.
