= Patołęka =

- Settlement
- Location within Poland
- Coordinates: 53°4′N 20°54′E
- Country: Poland
- Voivodeship: Masovian
- County: Przasnysz
- Gmina: Przasnysz

Patołęka [patɔˈwɛŋka] is a settlement in the administrative district of Gmina Przasnysz, within Przasnysz County, Masovian Voivodeship, in east-central Poland.
