= Helenowo-Gadomiec =

- Settlement
- Location within Poland
- Coordinates: 52°58′18″N 21°2′2″E
- Country: Poland
- Voivodeship: Masovian
- County: Przasnysz
- Gmina: Przasnysz

Helenowo-Gadomiec [xɛlɛˈnɔvɔ ɡaˈdɔmjɛt͡s] is a settlement in the administrative district of Gmina Przasnysz, within Przasnysz County, Masovian Voivodeship, in east-central Poland.
