= Frankowo, Masovian Voivodeship =

Frankowo
- Village
- Location within Poland
- Coordinates: 53°1′59″N 20°59′55″E
- Country: Poland
- Voivodeship: Masovian
- County: Przasnysz
- Gmina: Przasnysz

Frankowo [franˈkɔvɔ] is a village in the administrative district of Gmina Przasnysz, within Przasnysz County, Masovian Voivodeship, in east-central Poland.
