= Janin, Masovian Voivodeship =

Janin
- Settlement
- Location within Poland
- Coordinates: 52°58′07″N 20°51′37″E
- Country: Poland
- Voivodeship: Masovian
- County: Przasnysz
- Gmina: Przasnysz

Janin [ˈjanin] is a settlement in the administrative district of Gmina Przasnysz, within Przasnysz County, Masovian Voivodeship, in east-central Poland.
