= Nowa Krępa, Przasnysz County =

Nowa Krępa
- Settlement
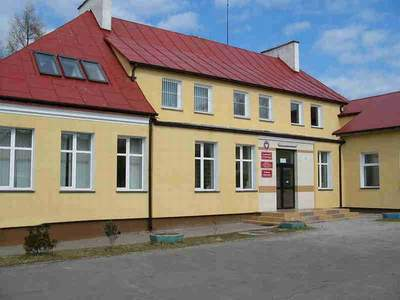
- School in Nowa Krępa

- Location within Poland
- Coordinates: 53°03′00″N 20°58′00″E
- Country: Poland
- Voivodeship: Masovian
- County: Przasnysz
- Gmina: Przasnysz
- Population: 40

Nowa Krępa [ˈnɔva ˈkrɛmpa] is a settlement in the administrative district of Gmina Przasnysz. It is situated within Przasnysz County, Masovian Voivodeship, in east-central Poland.
