= Stara Krępa =

- Village
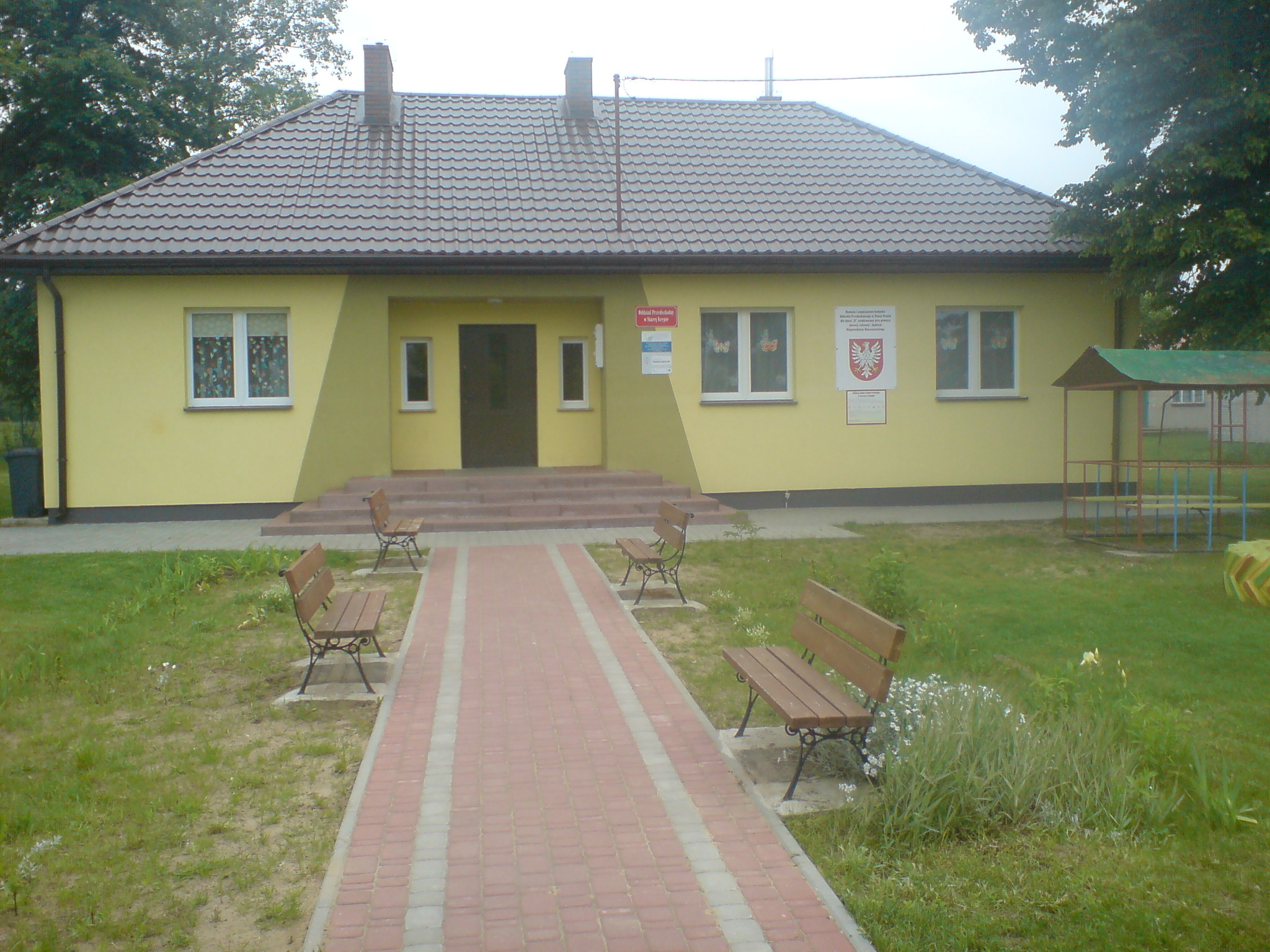

- Location within Poland
- Coordinates: 53°03′33″N 20°57′49″E
- Country: Poland
- Voivodeship: Masovian
- County: Przasnysz
- Gmina: Przasnysz

Stara Krępa [ˈstara ˈkrɛmpa] is a village in the administrative district of Gmina Przasnysz, within Przasnysz County, Masovian Voivodeship, in east-central Poland.
