= Józefowo, Przasnysz County =

Józefowo
- Settlement
- Location within Poland
- Coordinates: 52°59′12″N 20°58′54″E
- Country: Poland
- Voivodeship: Masovian
- County: Przasnysz
- Gmina: Przasnysz

Józefowo (Polish pronunciation: [juzɛˈfɔvɔ]) is a settlement in the administrative district of Gmina Przasnysz, within Przasnysz County, Masovian Voivodeship, in east-central Poland.
