= Gostkowo, Przasnysz County =

Gostkowo
- Village
- Location within Poland
- Coordinates: 52°58′N 20°55′E
- Country: Poland
- Voivodeship: Masovian
- County: Przasnysz
- Gmina: Przasnysz

Gostkowo [ɡɔstˈkɔvɔ] is a village in the administrative district of Gmina Przasnysz, within Przasnysz County, Masovian Voivodeship, in east-central Poland.
