= Fijałkowo =

- Village
- Location within Poland
- Coordinates: 52°59′50″N 20°59′32″E
- Country: Poland
- Voivodeship: Masovian
- County: Przasnysz
- Gmina: Przasnysz
- Population (approx.): 100

Fijałkowo [fijau̯ˈkɔvɔ] is a village in the administrative district of Gmina Przasnysz, within Przasnysz County, Masovian Voivodeship, in east-central Poland.
