= Nowe Helenowo =

- Village
- Location within Poland
- Coordinates: 52°58′32″N 21°00′43″E
- Country: Poland
- Voivodeship: Masovian
- County: Przasnysz
- Gmina: Przasnysz

Nowe Helenowo [ˈnɔvɛ xɛlɛˈnɔvɔ] is a village in the administrative district of Gmina Przasnysz, within Przasnysz County, Masovian Voivodeship, in east-central Poland.
