= Grabowo, Przasnysz County =

Grabowo
- Village
- Location within Poland
- Coordinates: 53°02′49″N 20°58′11″E
- Country: Poland
- Voivodeship: Masovian
- County: Przasnysz
- Gmina: Przasnysz

Grabowo [ɡraˈbɔvɔ] is a village in the administrative district of Gmina Przasnysz, within Przasnysz County, Masovian Voivodeship, in east-central Poland.
