= Wandolin =

- Village
- Location within Poland
- Coordinates: 53°02′01″N 20°55′43″E
- Country: Poland
- Voivodeship: Masovian
- County: Przasnysz
- Gmina: Przasnysz
- Population: 20

Wandolin [vanˈdɔlin] is a village in the administrative district of Gmina Przasnysz, within Przasnysz County, Masovian Voivodeship, in east-central Poland.
