= Stare Helenowo =

- Village
- Location within Poland
- Coordinates: 52°58′25″N 20°59′44″E
- Country: Poland
- Voivodeship: Masovian
- County: Przasnysz
- Gmina: Przasnysz

Stare Helenowo [ˈstarɛ xɛlɛˈnɔvɔ] is a village in the administrative district of Gmina Przasnysz, within Przasnysz County, Masovian Voivodeship, in east-central Poland.
