= Kijewice, Masovian Voivodeship =

Kijewice
- Village
- Location within Poland
- Coordinates: 53°3′34″N 20°50′12″E
- Country: Poland
- Voivodeship: Masovian
- County: Przasnysz
- Gmina: Przasnysz

Kijewice [kijɛˈvit͡sɛ] is a village in the administrative district of Gmina Przasnysz, within Przasnysz County, Masovian Voivodeship, in east-central Poland.
