= Mirów, Przasnysz County =

Mirów
- Village
- Location within Poland
- Coordinates: 53°02′46″N 20°49′53″E
- Country: Poland
- Voivodeship: Masovian
- County: Przasnysz
- Gmina: Przasnysz

Mirów [ˈmiruf] is a village in the administrative district of Gmina Przasnysz, within Przasnysz County, Masovian Voivodeship, in east-central Poland.
