= Księstwo, Masovian Voivodeship =

Księstwo
- Settlement
- Location within Poland
- Coordinates: 52°59′05″N 20°59′53″E
- Country: Poland
- Voivodeship: Masovian
- County: Przasnysz
- Gmina: Przasnysz

Księstwo [ˈkɕɛ̃stfɔ] is a settlement in the administrative district of Gmina Przasnysz, within Przasnysz County, Masovian Voivodeship, in east-central Poland.
