= Karbówko =

- Village
- Location within Poland
- Coordinates: 53°3′N 20°54′E
- Country: Poland
- Voivodeship: Masovian
- County: Przasnysz
- Gmina: Przasnysz

Karbówko [karˈbufkɔ] is a village in the administrative district of Gmina Przasnysz.
