= Klewki, Masovian Voivodeship =

Klewki
- Village
- Location within Poland
- Coordinates: 53°1′3″N 20°49′57″E
- Country: Poland
- Voivodeship: Masovian
- County: Przasnysz
- Gmina: Przasnysz

Klewki [ˈklɛfki] is a village in the administrative district of Gmina Przasnysz, within Przasnysz County, Masovian Voivodeship, in east-central Poland.
