= Lisiogóra =

- Village
- Location within Poland
- Coordinates: 52°57′N 20°56′E
- Country: Poland
- Voivodeship: Masovian
- County: Przasnysz
- Gmina: Przasnysz

Lisiogóra [liɕɔˈɡura] is a village in the administrative district of Gmina Przasnysz, within Przasnysz County, Masovian Voivodeship, in east-central Poland. In the census of 2021 it was determined to have a population of 105.
