= Zawadki, Masovian Voivodeship =

Zawadki
- Village
- Location within Poland
- Coordinates: 53°2′N 20°57′E
- Country: Poland
- Voivodeship: Masovian
- County: Przasnysz
- Gmina: Przasnysz

Zawadki [zaˈvatki] is a village in the administrative district of Gmina Przasnysz, within Przasnysz County, Masovian Voivodeship, in east-central Poland.
