= Góry Karwackie =

- Village
- Location within Poland
- Coordinates: 53°3′N 20°58′E
- Country: Poland
- Voivodeship: Masovian
- County: Przasnysz
- Gmina: Przasnysz

Góry Karwackie [ˈɡurɨ karˈvat͡skʲɛ] is a village in the administrative district of Gmina Przasnysz, within Przasnysz County, Masovian Voivodeship, in east-central Poland.
