= Wygoda, Przasnysz County =

Wygoda
- Village
- Location within Poland
- Coordinates: 53°3′N 20°55′E
- Country: Poland
- Voivodeship: Masovian
- County: Przasnysz
- Gmina: Przasnysz

Wygoda [vɨˈɡɔda] is a village in the administrative district of Gmina Przasnysz, within Przasnysz County, Masovian Voivodeship, in east-central Poland.
