= Wyrąb Karwacki =

- Village
- Location within Poland
- Coordinates: 53°1′N 21°0′E
- Country: Poland
- Voivodeship: Masovian
- County: Przasnysz
- Gmina: Przasnysz
- Time zone: UTC+1 (CET)
  - Summer (DST): UTC+2 (CEST)

Wyrąb Karwacki [ˈvɨrɔmp karˈvat͡ski] is a village in the administrative district of Gmina Przasnysz, within Przasnysz County, Masovian Voivodeship, in east-central Poland.

Five Polish citizens were murdered by Nazi Germany in the village during World War II.
