= Włocławek Cathedral =

- Cathedral Basilica of St. Mary of the Assumption
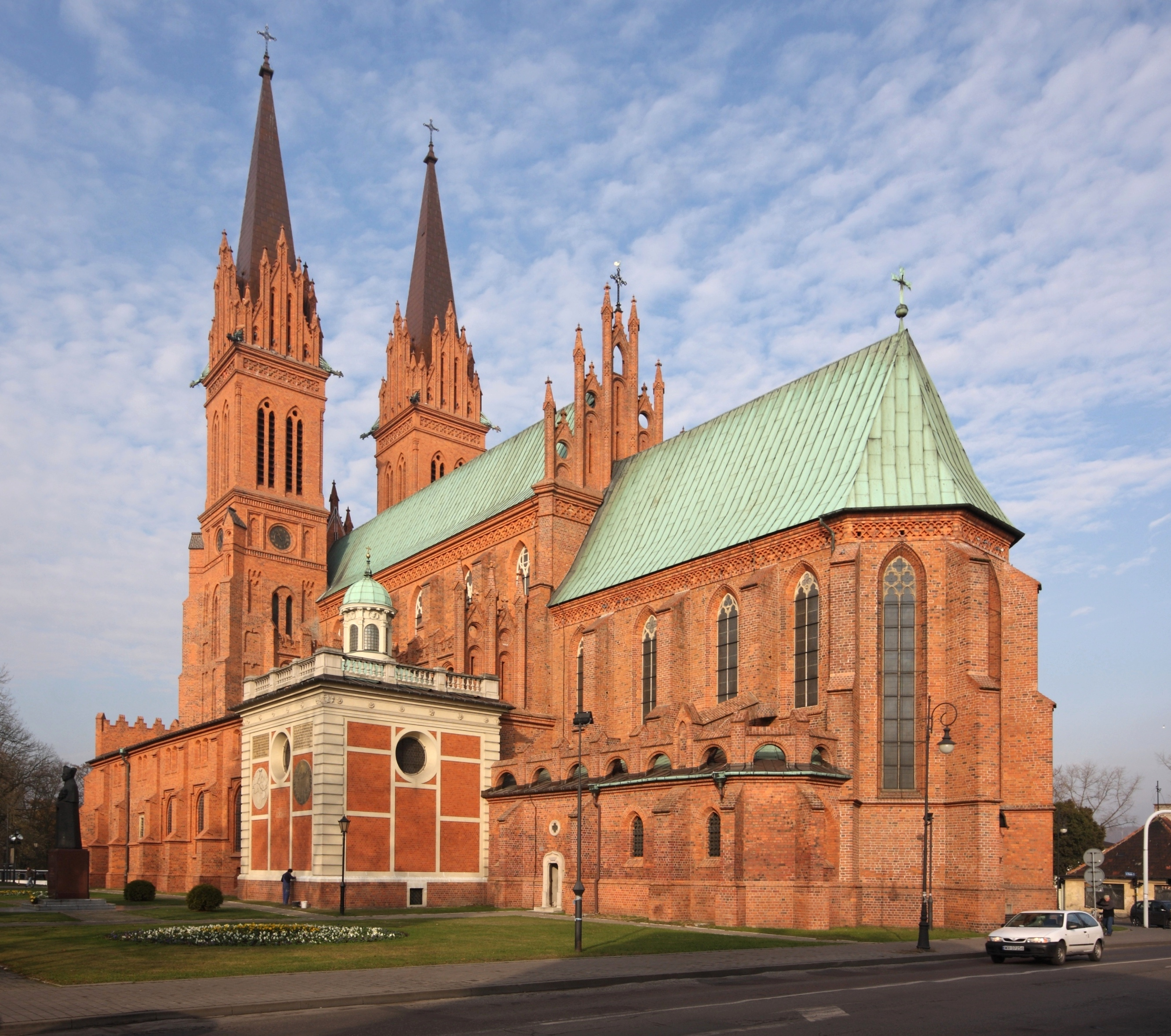
- Włocławek Cathedral
- 52.661°N 19.068°E
- Country: Poland
- Denomination: Catholic

Architecture
- Style: Gothic, neo-Gothic

Administration
- Diocese: Włocławek

Historic Monument of Poland
- Designated: 2018-12-10
- Reference no.: Dz. U. z 2018 r. poz. 2421

The Basilica Cathedral of St. Mary of the Assumption is a large Gothic building situated in the Polish city of Włocławek located near to the Vistula River. Construction on the cathedral began in the 1340s, and it was consecrated in 1411. It was still under construction in the 15th and at the beginning of the 16th century, until its completion in 1526. It is one of the greatest treasure troves of funerary art in Poland next to the cathedrals in Gniezno, Poznań and Kraków.

In the years 1883–1901, the building was heavily regothicised, including exchange of details and elevation of both towers. It is a three-nave temple with a narrower and much lower presbytery. Among the monuments located inside, the following deserve particular attention: stained-glass windows from 1360, the tombstone of bishop Peter of Bnin from 1494, a wooden statue of Our Lady from the early fifteenth century and the painting of the Assumption of the Blessed Virgin Mary by John the Great from around 1480.

== Background information and the history of the cathedral ==
=== The first places of worship in Wloclawek ===
When Wloclawek became a bishopric, there may already have been two places of worship in the city. One of them was probably a castle chapel, and the other was St. John the Baptist Church with which the parish functioned that was administered then by Benedictines. The castle chapel, which was under the auspices of the prince, played the role of the first cathedral. According to the chronicler Jan Dlugosz, bishop Swidger (around 1133) equipped the new cathedral in Wloclawek, and adapted the castle chapel which was dedicated to St. Mary of the Assumption. However, the first written information about the cathedral in Wloclawek comes only from 1185.

Because of its location the cathedral often suffered damage. The waters of the Vistula River, and fires also contributed to its destruction, which finally led to the building of a new cathedral under the guidance of the bishop Michal Godziemba (1222-1252). He decided to set up the new cathedral in place of the first cathedral. It is not known for certain when this second cathedral was set up. It was probably a three-aisle building made of stone in the Romanesque style with a wooden ceiling. It lasted until 1329 when the Teutonic Knights destroyed it. It was located to the southeast of the castle, near Gdanska, Bednarska and Zamcza streets. According to sources, some of the building material from the demolition of the burnt cathedral (granite stone) was used to build the tenement house at 2 Bednarska Street.

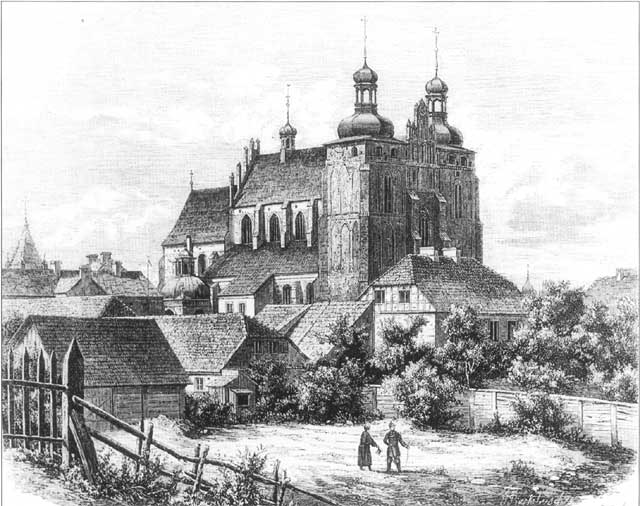
Wloclawek's Cathedral in 1863, view from the estuary of Zglowiaczka river, picture by Adolf Kozarski

Research into the history of the first cathedrals in Wloclawek is as yet incomplete. It requires further investigation and excavations. The situation is slightly better when it comes to the third – still extant– basilica cathedral.

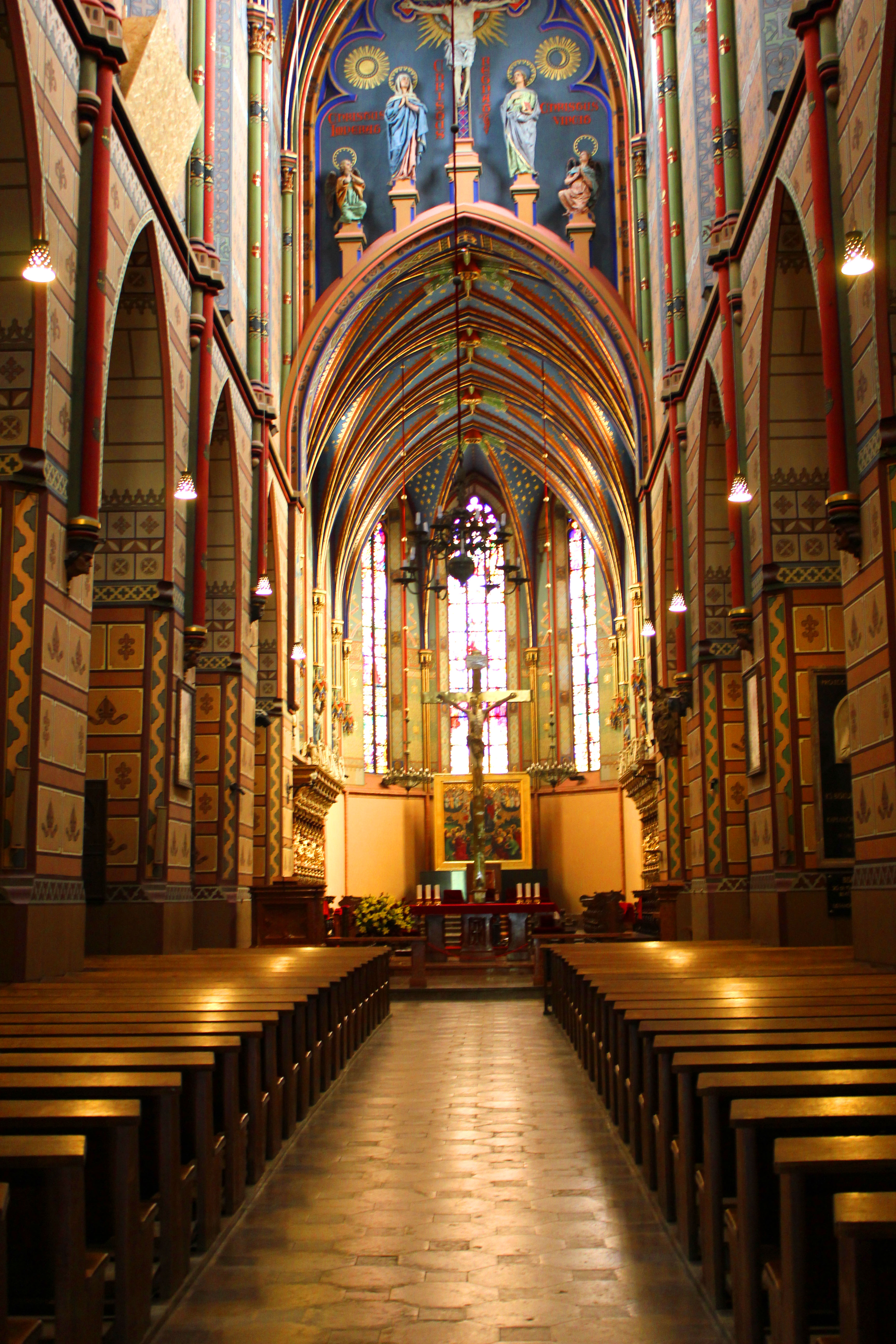
Interior

=== The current cathedral ===
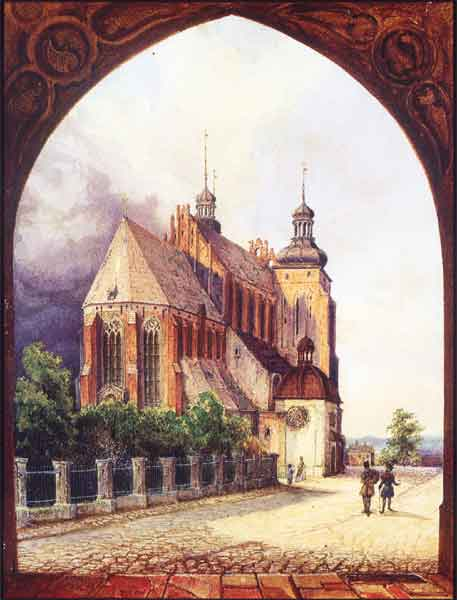
The cathedral in 1842, picture by Georg Ferdinand Gregorivovus

The history of the cathedral of St. Mary of the Assumption begins during the episcopate of Bishop Maciej of Golancz (1323-1364). He was a canon of Wloclawek, Gniezno, Poznan, Plock, Cracow, and Wroclaw. Maciej was the first initiator and the builder of the cathedral.

On 7 May 1329 Teutonic troops captured Wloclawek, and destroyed the borough, concentrating in particular on the bishop's property. The Teutonic Knights forbade restoring the bishop's town and the cathedral on pain of death.

On 24 August 1330 Maciej of Golancz decided to sign a pact with the Grand Master of the Teutonic Knights, Werner von Orseln, who allowed him to resume public religious activities. To this end, a small church beyond the city was built as a temporary solution. But Maciej Golanczewski still wanted to build a cathedral, and collected funds and created plans to do so. On 25 March 1340 he consecrated the cornerstone to begin building the new cathedral. During the next 25 years, the construction on the walls of the cathedral was ongoing; Maciej's nephew - Zbylut (1365-1383) succeeded to the bishopric, and continued building the cathedral. The details of the construction process are uncertain. The first stage, including the presbytery, southern vestry and treasury, were most likely completed under the guidance of Maciej Golanczewski. During Zbylut's incumbency in the diocese the roofs of the lofts and vestry were finished, and the high altar with the figure of the Mother of God was set up.

The chronicler Jan Długosz noted in "Roczniki" the beginning of the construction of the present-day cathedral, initiated by Bishop Maciej Pałuka from Gołańcza, who was to lay the foundation stone on 25 March 1340. The construction started in a new place outside the city, near the Vistula escarpment. In 1350 the altar of St. John and Andrew was erected and equipped. First, a long presbytery and the southern sacristy were erected, followed by the construction of the main body after 1358. Following the death of Bishop Maciej Pałuka, the construction was continued after 1364 by his nephew, Bishop Zbylut of Gołańcza.

=== Changes made to the cathedral ===
On 13 May 1411 a ceremonious consecration of the cathedral attended by the king of Poland Wladyslaw Jagiello took place. But the cathedral was not yet finished. Construction continued over the course of the next centuries.

The body of the main nave was completed at the beginning of the 15th century. The origins of the modest shape of the cathedral are a subject of discussion among art historians, who, for example, propose the view that the cathedral in Gniezno was used as a model, or that similar patterns should be sought among buildings originating from the tradition formed in the artistic environment of the Upper Rhineland, including the church of the Cistercian Abbey in Salem. In 1392, an expenditure on roofing was recorded. In 1411 the cathedral was consecrated by Bishop Jan Kropidło. In the fifteenth and sixteenth centuries, works on the tower and chapels continued. Four-armed star-shaped ceilings from the turn of the 14th and 15th centuries come from the architectural tradition of the Teutonic Order. Twenty-two quarters of Gothic stained-glass windows from the presbytery have been preserved to this day, currently displayed in the Chapel of St. Barbara.

Chapels started to be built around the main body of the church in the second half of the 15th century. At the southern nave, the St. Martin's Chapel and the Chapter House were built in 1527, and the Cibavit Chapel in 1541. In the first quarter of the 16th century, two of the chapels (the chapel of the Blessed Virgin Mary and the one opposite St. Casimir) were rebuilt in the Mannerist style. They were covered with domes with lanterns.

There are mentions that prelates and canons of the chapter in Wloclawek gave up part of their income for the further building and conservation of the cathedral. In the second part of the 15th century work was started on the chapels around the main body of the church. Next to the southern nave, St. Martin's Chapel and chapterhouse were built in 1527 and the Cibavit chapel in 1541. At the beginning of the 16th century these two chapels were remodelled in the Mannerist style which included covering them with cupolas with lanterns. Over time, the cathedral needed renovation. In the second part of the 18th century the roof was renovated while in the 19th century the cathedral was regothicised. The bishop Wincenty Teofil Chosciak wanted the cathedral to look more monumental and decided to enlarge the towers. The works began in 1878. They enlarged the towers, and finished them off with pointed cupolas.

The roof was renovated in the second half of the 18th century. In 1891, Konstanty Wojciechowski began work on the rebuilding of the cathedral. According to his design, a chapel was added along the northern nave as well as the western porch, thus obtaining a symmetrical arrangement of the building. The towers, originally not higher than the roof of the main nave, and later covered with bubble domes, were extended by two soaring floors in neo-Gothic style. The works also consisted of replacing numerous elements of decoration of the interior, which obliterated the original Gothic character of the cathedral. A large portion of modern equipment was also removed. The works were completed in 1902. In 1907 the cathedral was honoured with the title of minor basilica. The title was given by the Pope Pius X.

An important event in the history of the cathedral was the visit of Pope John Paul II, who stayed in Wloclawek on 6 and 7 June 1991 during his fourth journey to his home country.

== Interior ==
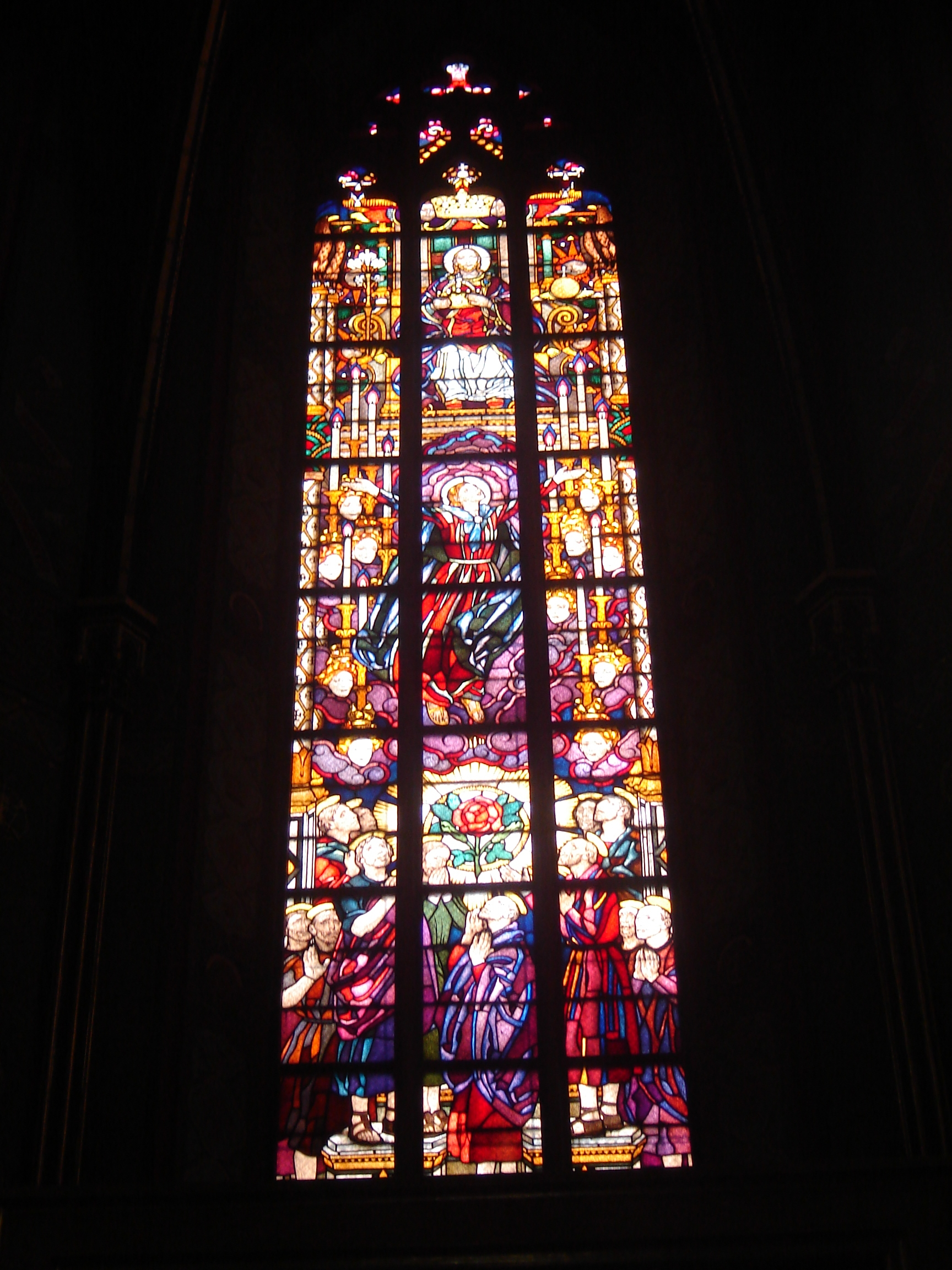
Stained glass in the basilica cathedral

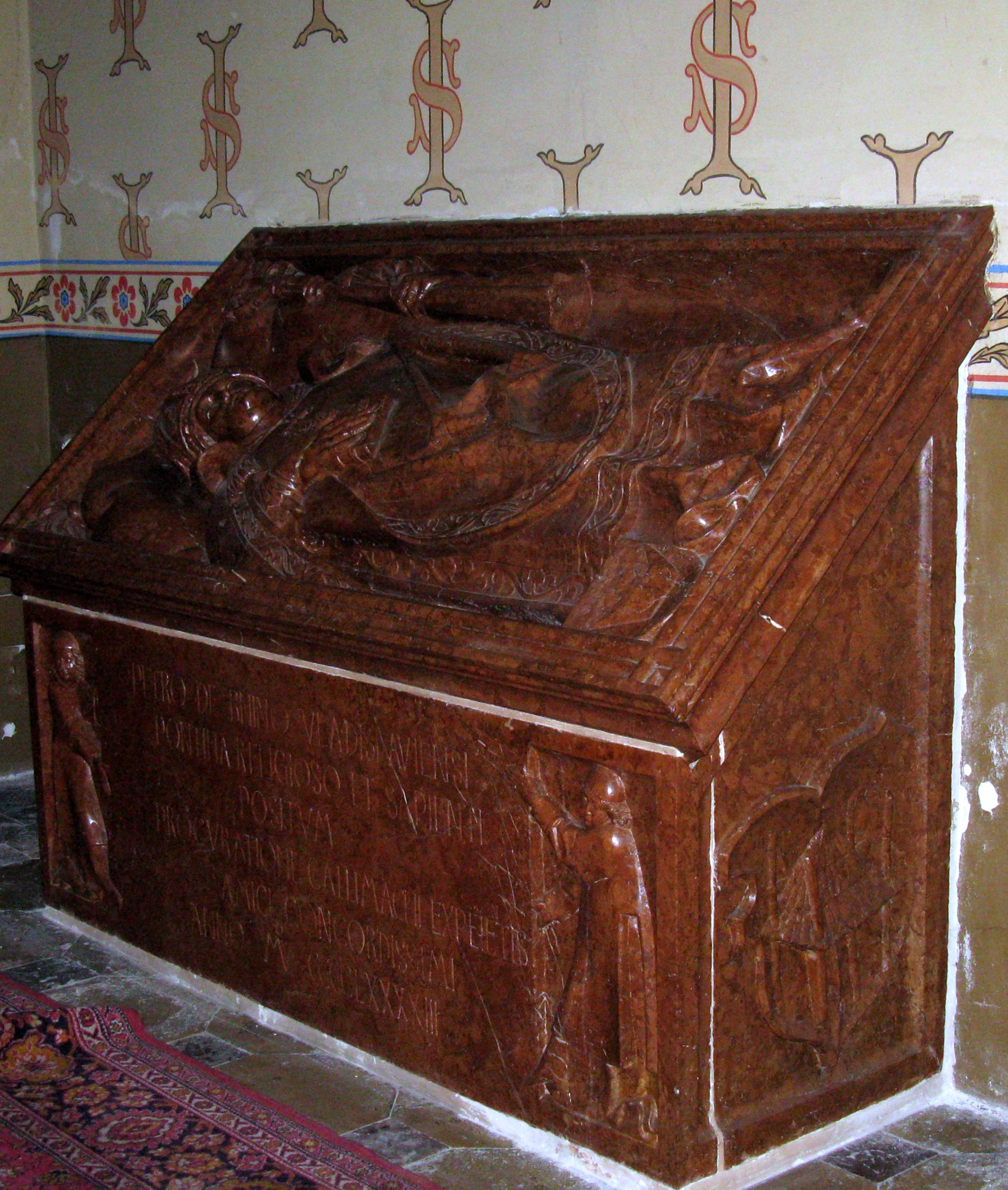
Tomb of the bishop Piotr from Bnin by Veit Stoss

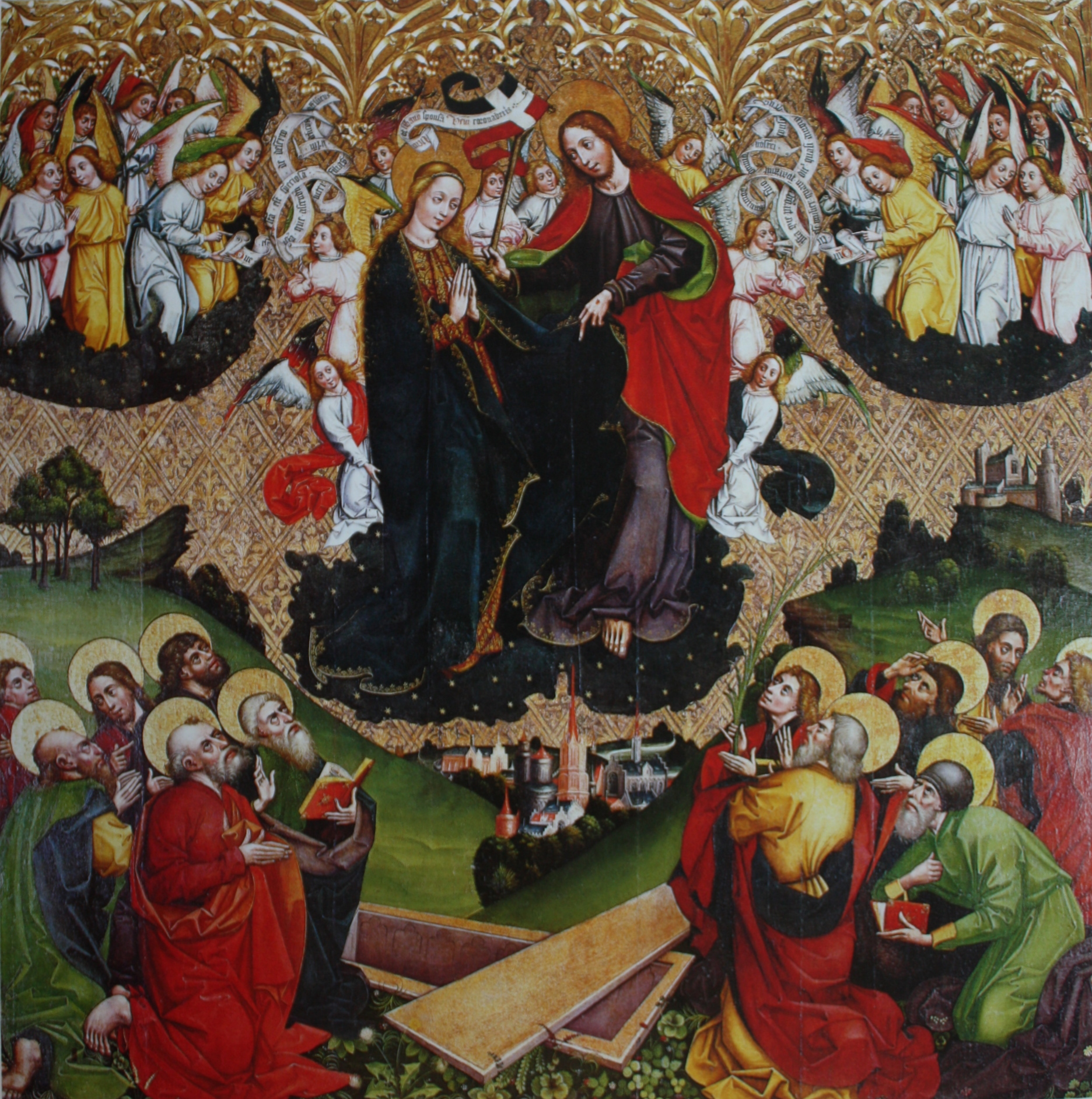
The Assumption of St. Mary by Jan Wielki from 1480

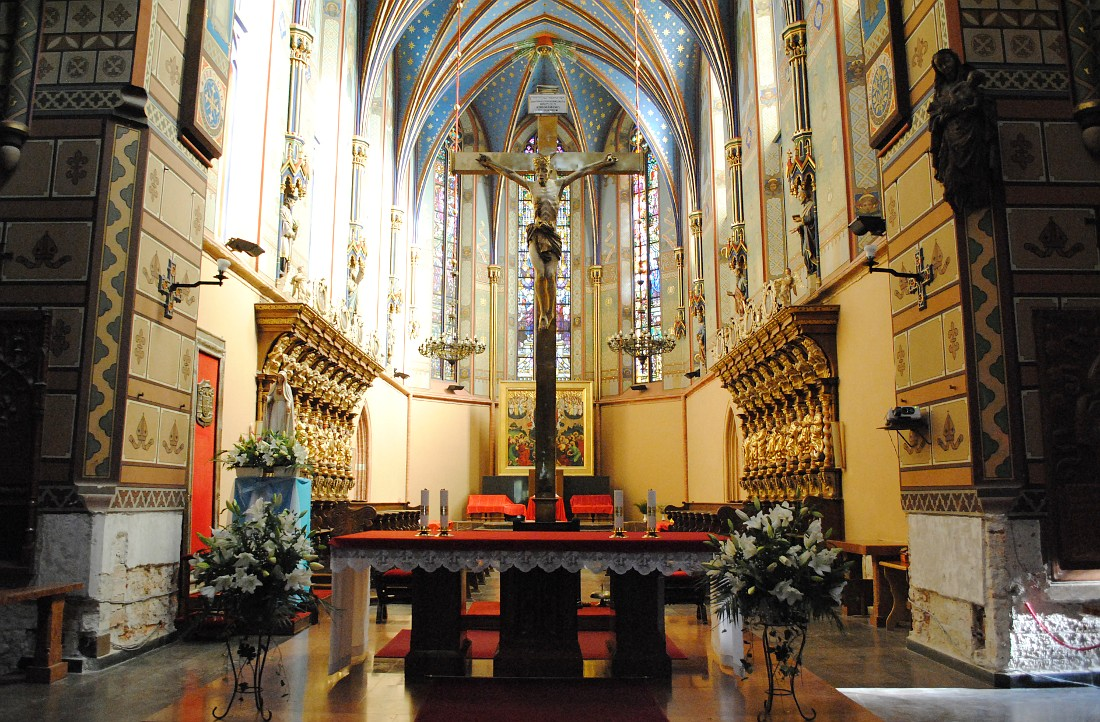
The presbytery in the cathedral

- The interior is decorated with polychrome by brothers Stanislaw and Zdzislaw Jasinski, created in 1900–1901.
- There are stained-glass windows by Józef Mehoffer (1938) in the presbytery window, of which the middle window shows the Assumption of the Virgin Mary
- Gothic stained-glass windows from around 1350, partially preserved to this day in the Chapel of Saint Barbara (originally in the presbytery)
- The tombstone of Bishop Piotr of Bnin in St. Joseph's Chapel, made in red marble by Wit Stwosz in 1494.
- A Gothic painting of the Assumption of Mary of the Warta River attributed to John the Great, dated 1475.
- Renaissance marble tombstone of Bishop Krzesław of Kurozwęki from 1516.
- Renaissance bronze tombstone of Bishop Jan Karnkowski from 1536.
- Wooden Gothic sculpture of Our Lady dating back to the early fifteenth century.
- The group of the Last Supper from 1505, polychromed.
- The Great Cathedral Cross, standing at the entrance to the presbytery, founded in the early 17th century.
- Baroque stalls from 1683.
- A neo-Gothic Group of the Crucifixion is located on an arch above the entrance to the presbytery.

Until 2012, first in the chancel and. since the 1970s, in the chapel of the Annunciation of the Blessed Virgin Mary, there was a seven-arm candlestick, 310 cm high and 380 cm wide, cast in bronze in 1596 by the Riga Conviser Hans Meyer for St. Peter's Church in Riga. The monument was transferred to Włocławek during World War II together with a group of German settlers from Latvia, who were resettled as part of the Heim ins Reich action. In February 2012, the candle stick returned to Riga in accordance with the agreement with the authorities of the Republic of Latvia on the repatriation of cultural assets.

On 10 April 2011, a plaque commemorating the victims of the catastrophe of Tu-154 in Smolensk was unveiled in the cathedral.

In 2018, the cathedral was inscribed on the list of historical monuments as part of the '100 Historical Monuments for the Century of Independence' campaign.

The three-aisle interior is maintained in the gothic style, but has baroque and neo-Gothic elements in it. The cathedral contains some great pieces of art from different centuries, including the following:

- The tomb of Piotr of Bnin Moszczynski, dating from about 1496, funded by Kallimach and made by the famous sculptor Veit Stoss. It is now located in St. Joseph's chapel. Examples of Renaissance art such as the tombstone of bishop Krzeslaw Kurozwecki made of marble in 1516 and the tombstone of bishop Jan Karnkowski made in 1536
- Wooden sculptures of the Mother of God from the beginning of the 15th century and a polychrome group of the Last Supper from 1505
- An early baroque sepulchral memorial of two bishops Pstrokonski and Lubienski from 1629 by Augustin von Oyen. It was made of multicolour marble and alabaster, and is situated in the eastern Manneristic niche. In the entrance of the niche, there is a great portal from the 17th century
- Gothic stained glass from about 1360 made probably in Toruń and funded by the bishop Zbylut Golanczewski
- Art Nouveau stained glass designed by Jozef Mehoffer made in 1938/1939
- Assumption of the Blessed Virgin Mary – a picture dating to around 1475 ascribed to Francis of Sieradz
- The Assumption of St. Mary by Jan Wielki from 1480
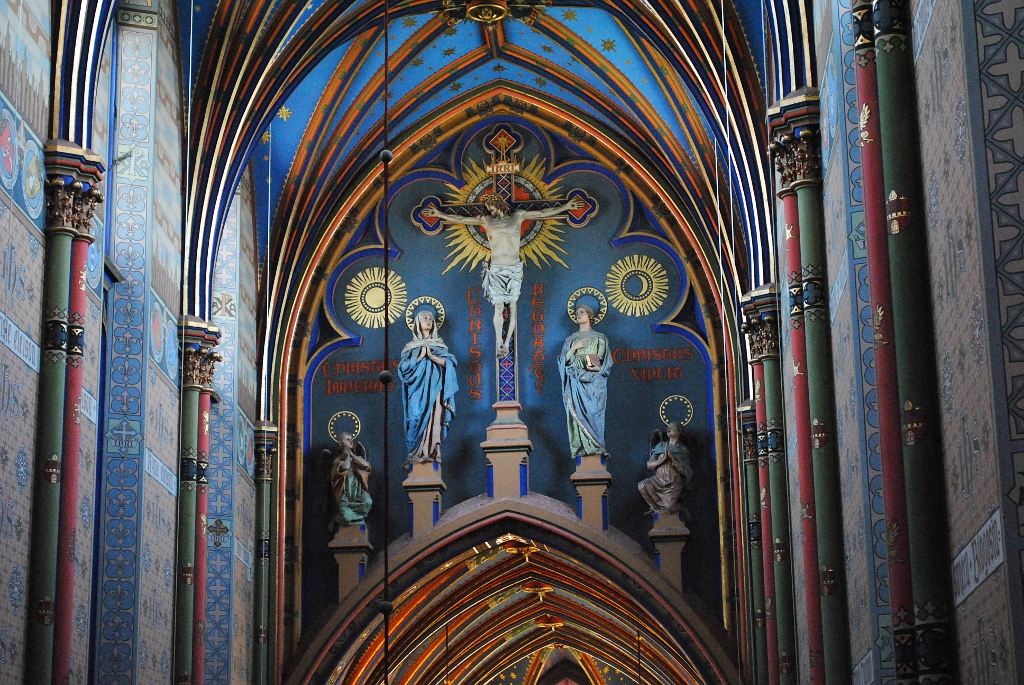
Neo-Gothic group of the Crucifixion

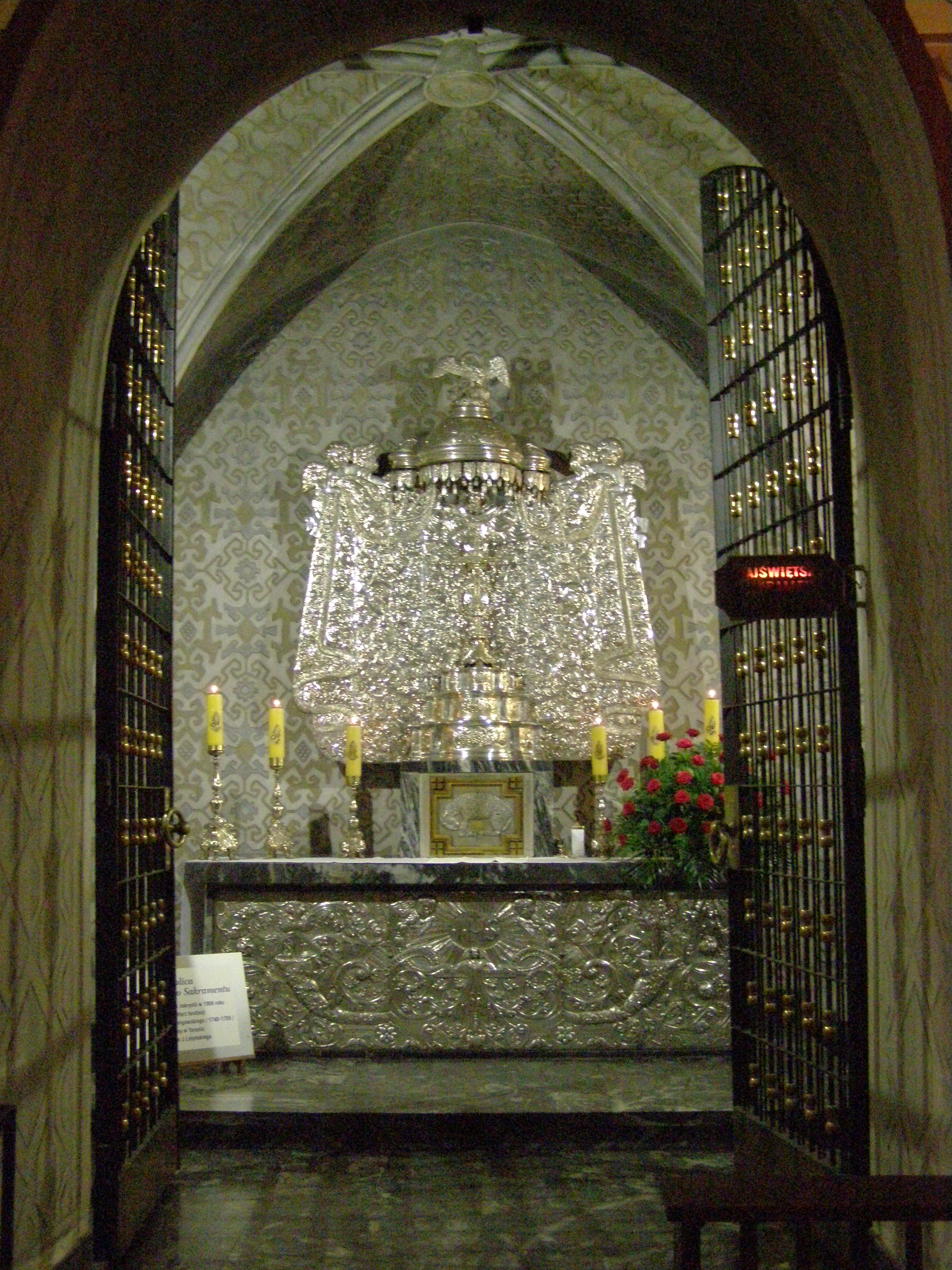
Blessed Sacrament Chapel

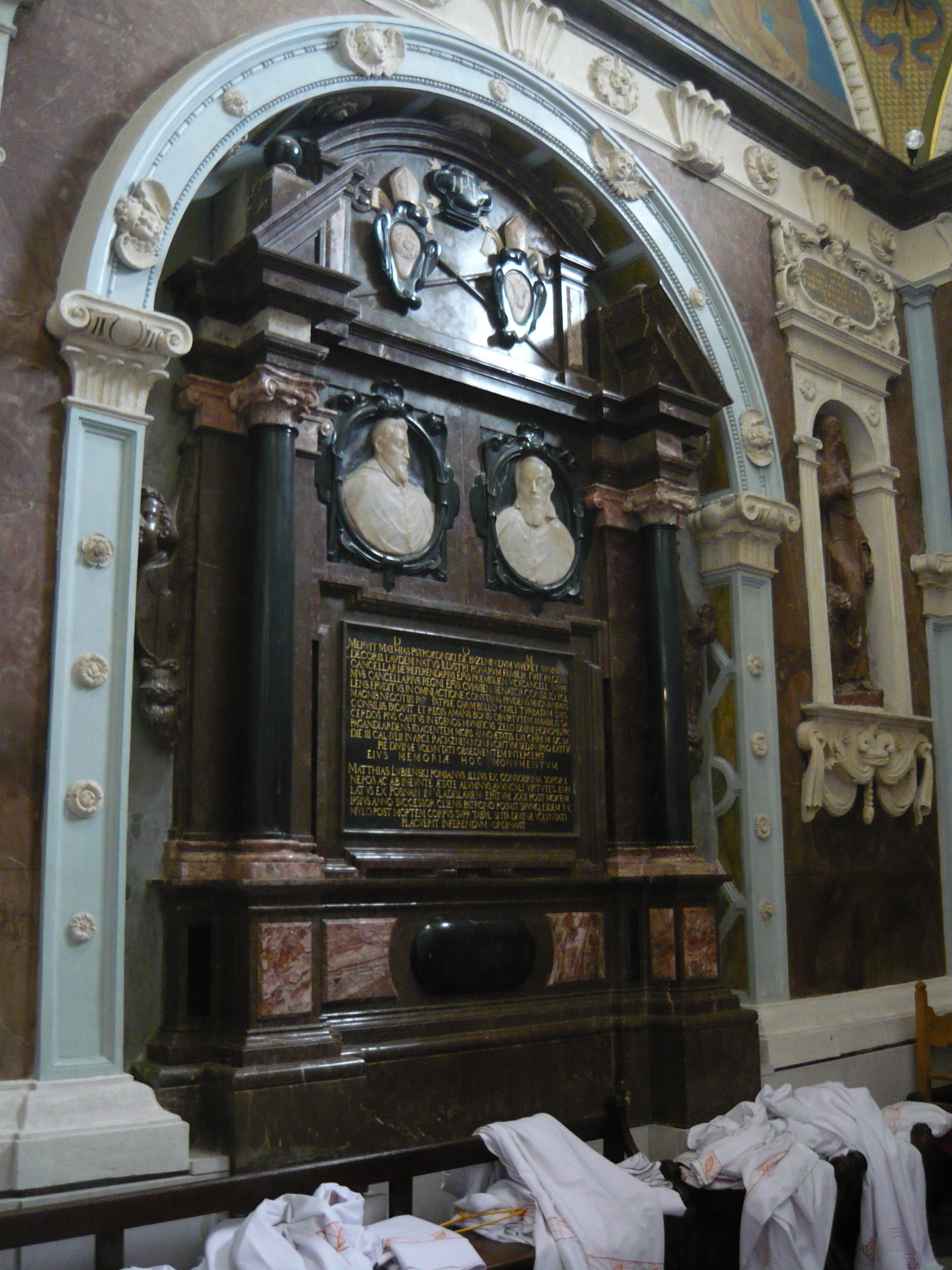
Memorial in the side aisle of Włocławek Cathedral

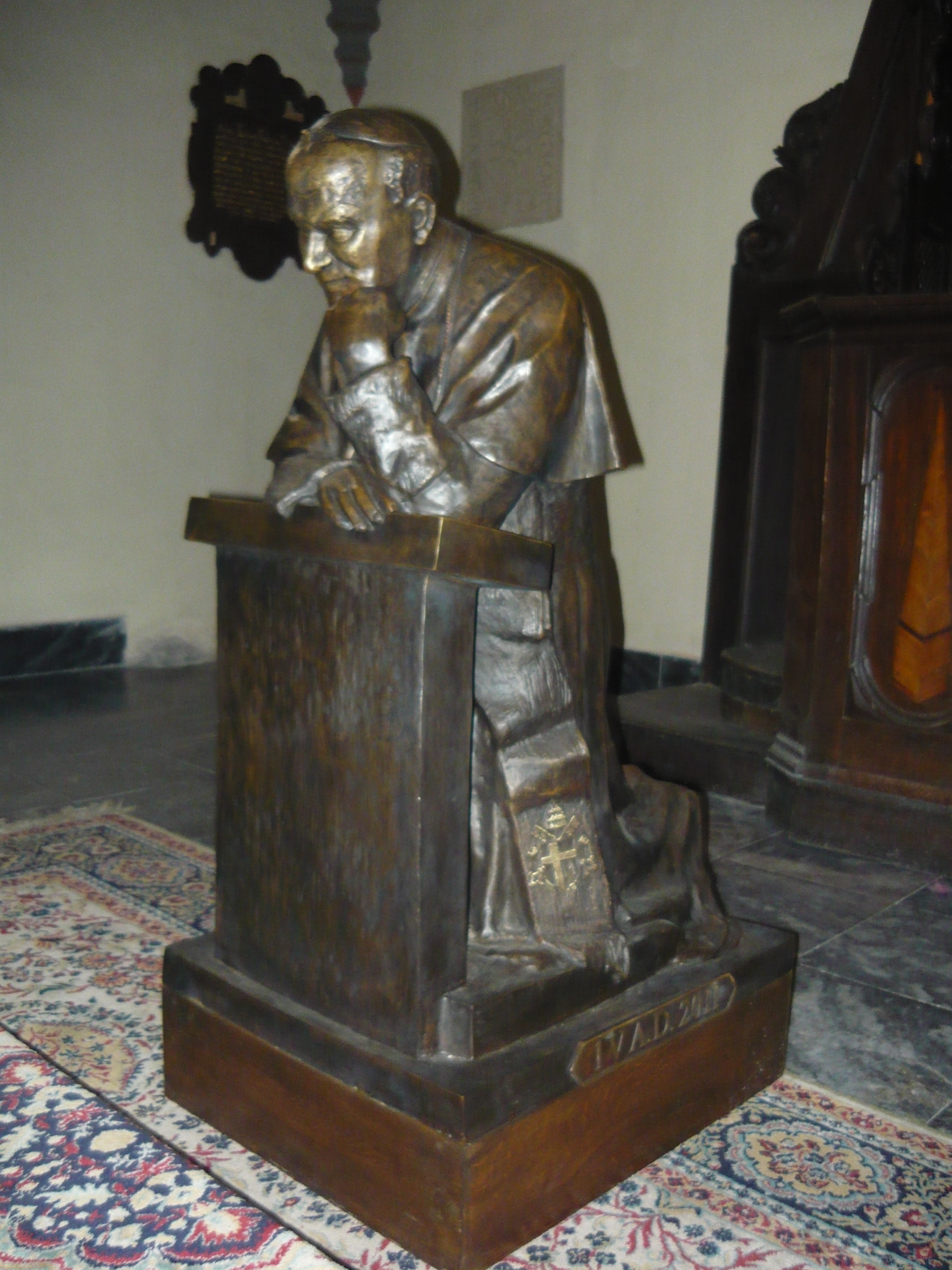
Monument to John Paul II in one of the side aisles of the Cathedral of the Assumption

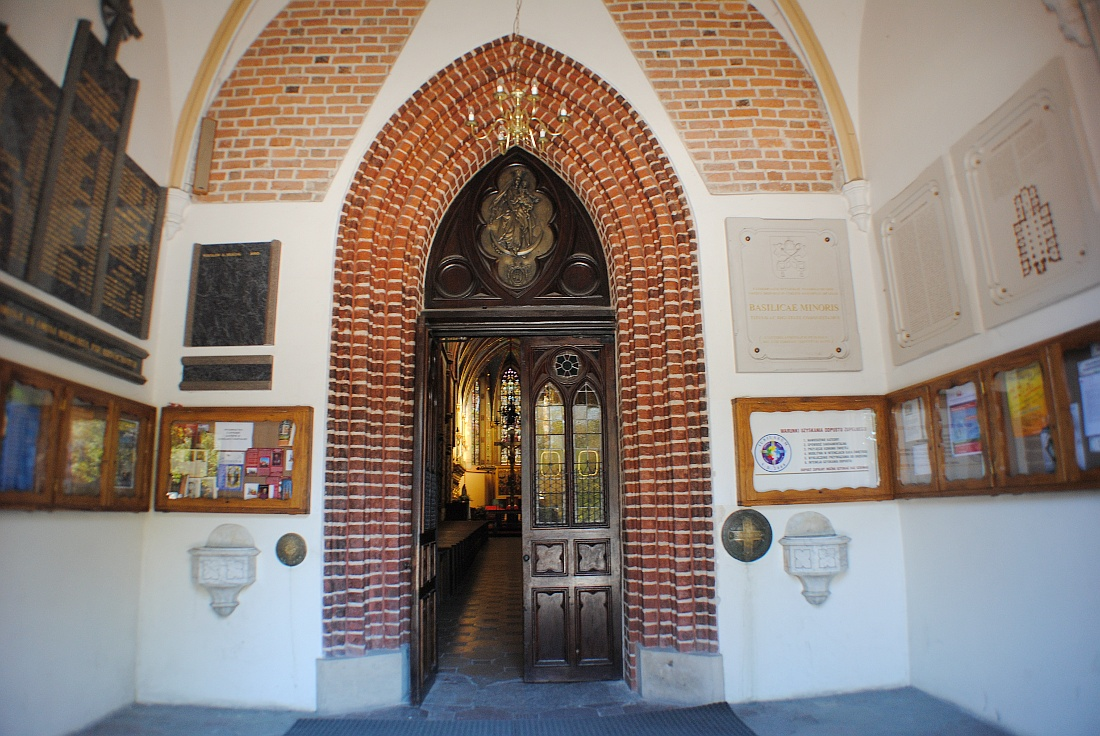
The Porch of the Cathedral

== The organization of the church ==
In 2015 Michal Krygier became the new parish priest.

Paweł Skowron - vicar

Sebastian Adamczyk - vicar

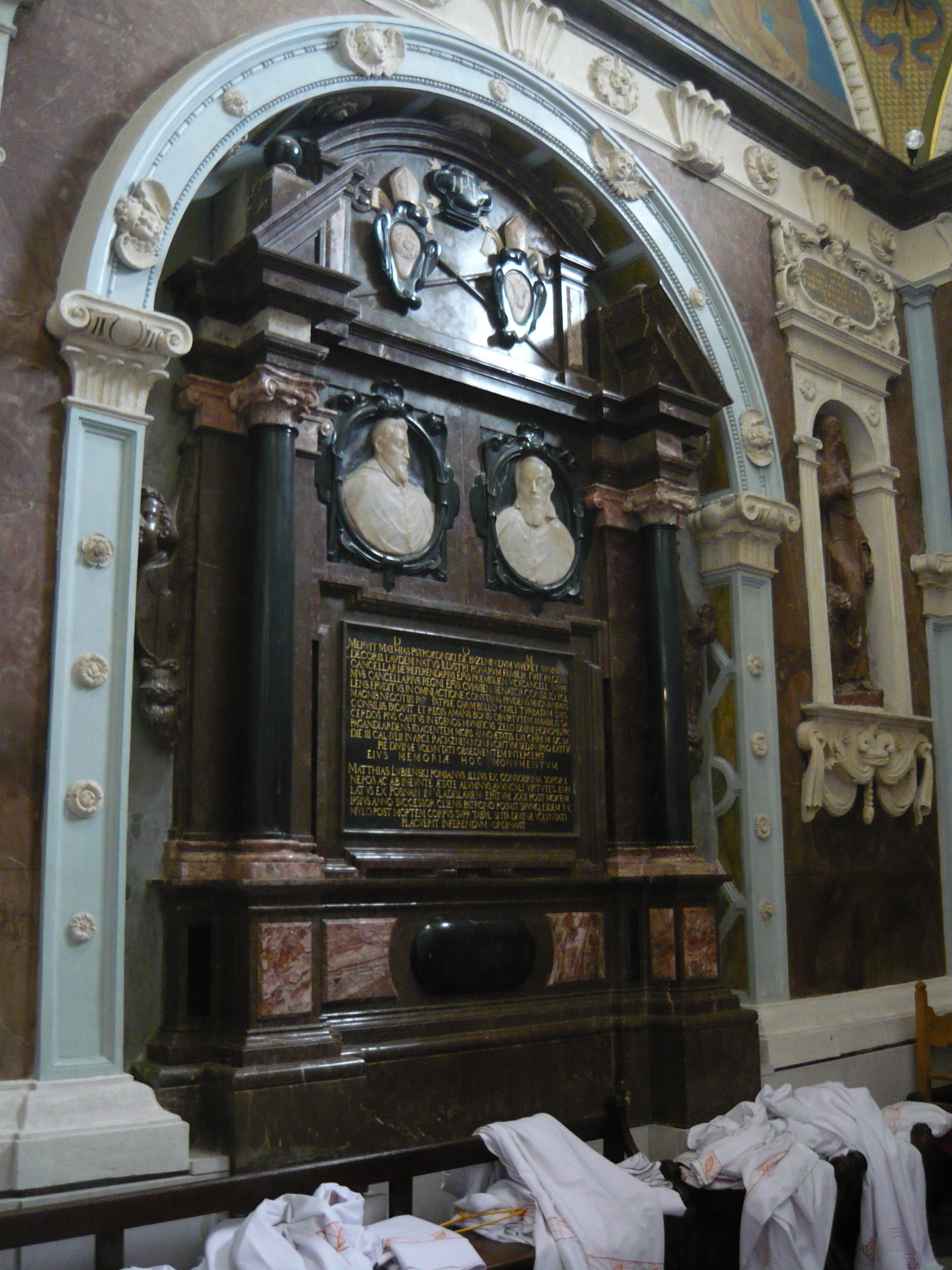
Monument to Mateusz Pstrokonski and Mateusz Lubienski in Wloclawek cathedral's aisle.

== The choir ==
When the orchestra which had functioned in the cathedral since the 18th century closed down, the priest Leon Moczyński formed a choir out of seminarians. After some time, some people from the city expressed willingness to join in. Therefore, the cathedral had two choirs – the one formed by priests, and the mixed one formed by lay boys and men. They often performed together as cathedral choirs.

In 1925 part of the choir broke away from the cathedral and became the Association of Former Cathedral Choirs “Lute” (Lutnia) (which still exists today). The priest Andrzej Nodzynski reformed the cathedral choir and continued to work with it.

In 1938 Tadeusz Guzenda became the conductor of the choir. In the 60s he formed, alongside the male choir, a female one. When the priest Zbigniew Szygenda was conductor, he united both choirs. Since 1983 Jozef Nowak has been the conductor of the choir that consists of 45 people.

== Masses and sightseeing ==
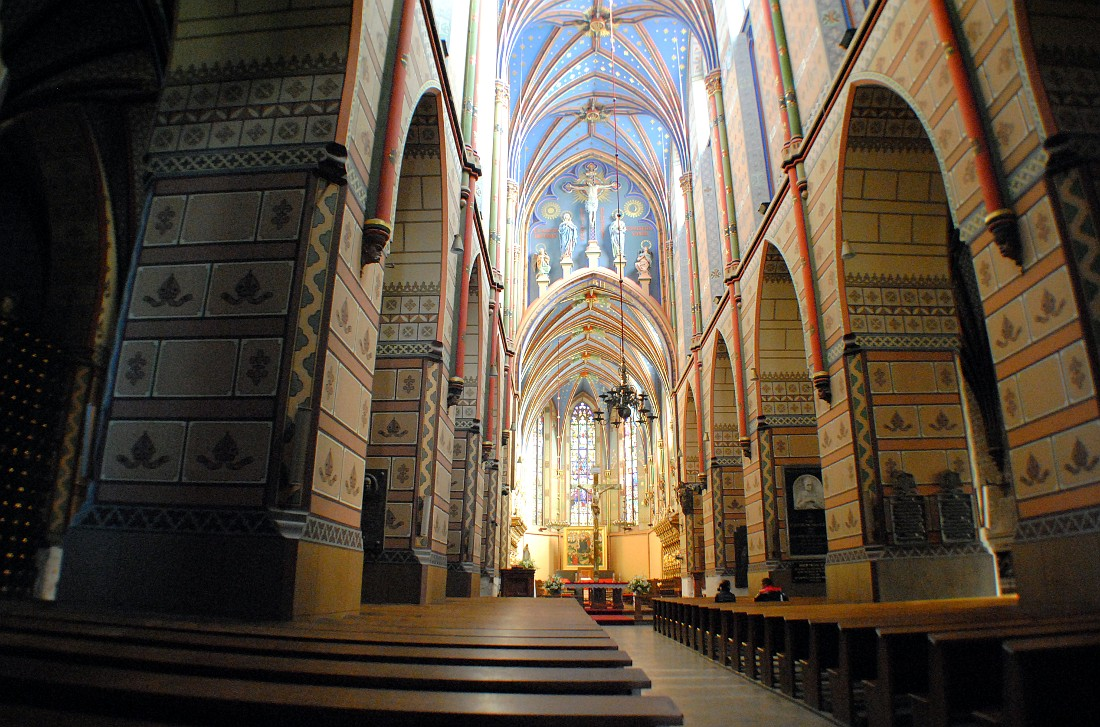
Main aisle

1. Monday: 7am Mass; 4pm Benediction and the Bead-roll and litany to St. Joseph 6pm Mass
2. Tuesday: 7am Mass; 4pm Benediction and service to Blessed Bishop Michal Kozal, the patron of Wloclawek 6pm Mass
3. Wednesday: 7am Mass; 4pm Benediction and Novena to Our Lady of Perpetual Help 6pm Mass
4. Thursday: 7am Mass; 4pm Benediction and the Prayer for priestly vocation through the intercession of John Paul II 6pm Mass
5. Friday: 7am Mass; 4pm Benediction and Chaplet of the Divine Mercy 6pm Mass
6. Saturday: 7am Mass; 6pm Mass
7. Sunday: 7am Mass; 8am Mass; 9.30am Mass; 11am Mass; with children and youth; 12.30pm Mass; 6pm Mass

There is an option to tour the cathedral with a guide on the following days: Tuesday: 9am-3pm; Wednesday and Thursday: 10am-4pm; Friday: 9am-3pm, Saturday: 9am-2pm. The cost of the tour for the entire group is 30 PLN.

== Gallery ==
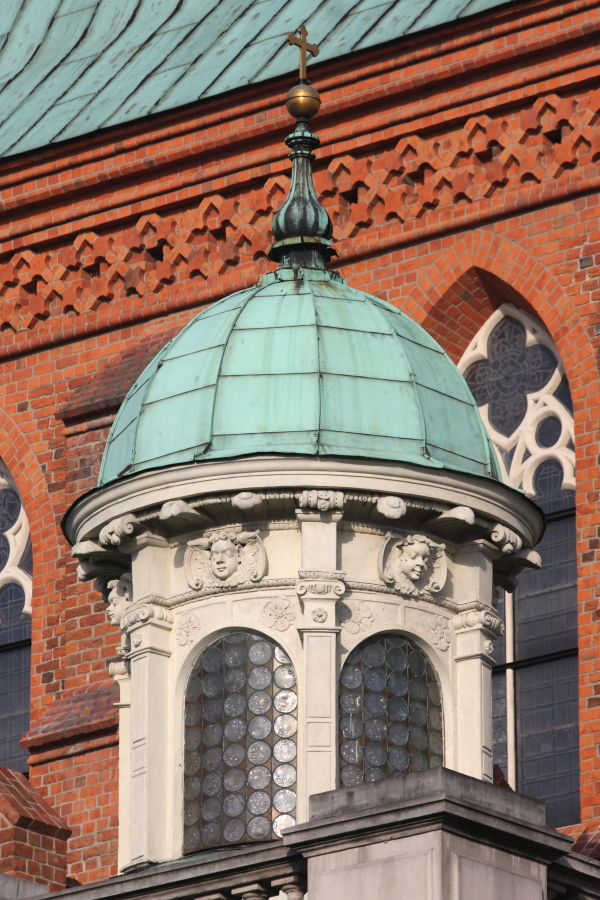
Lantern of the Chapel of the Virgin Mary

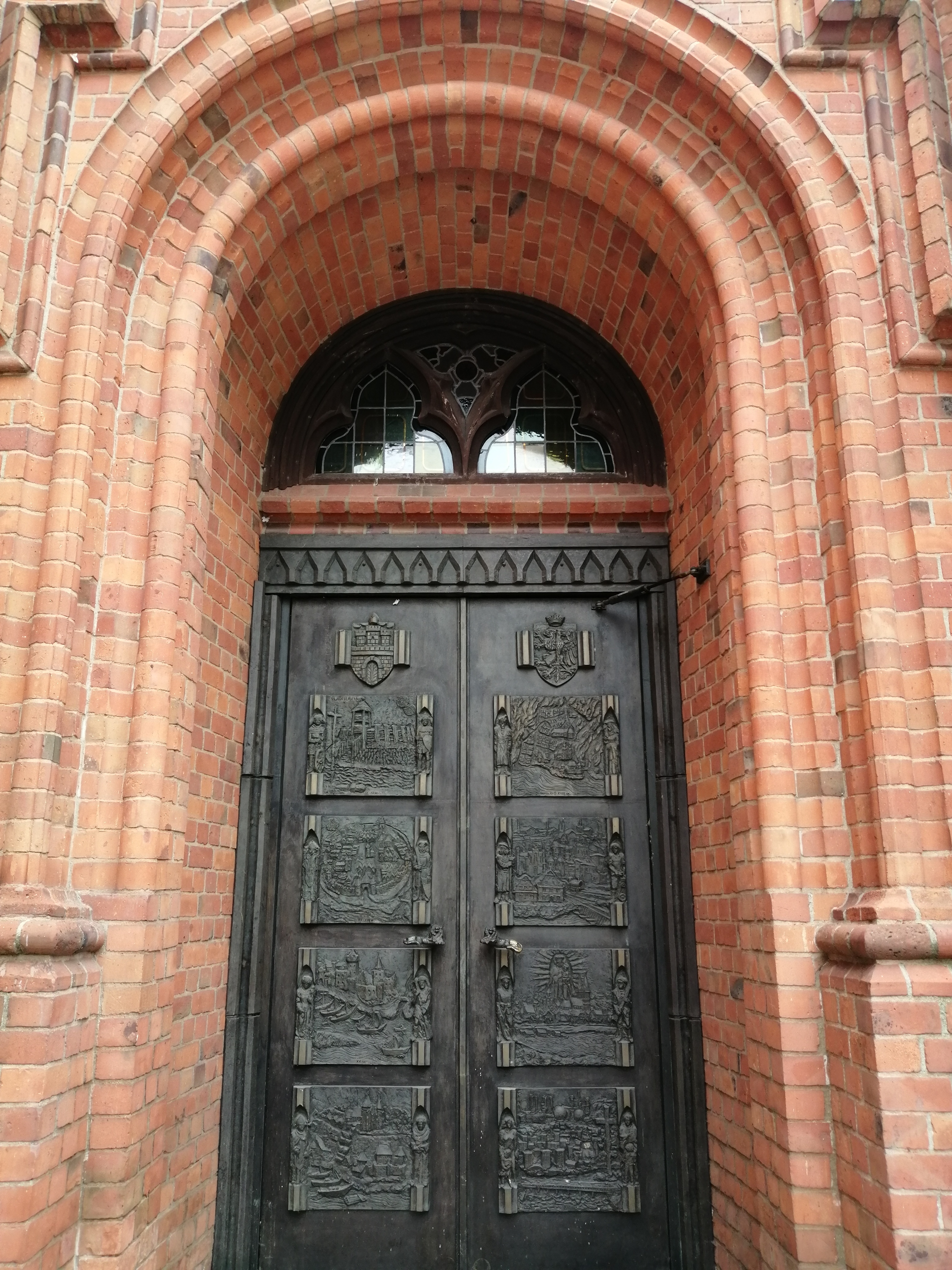
Cathedral's side gate

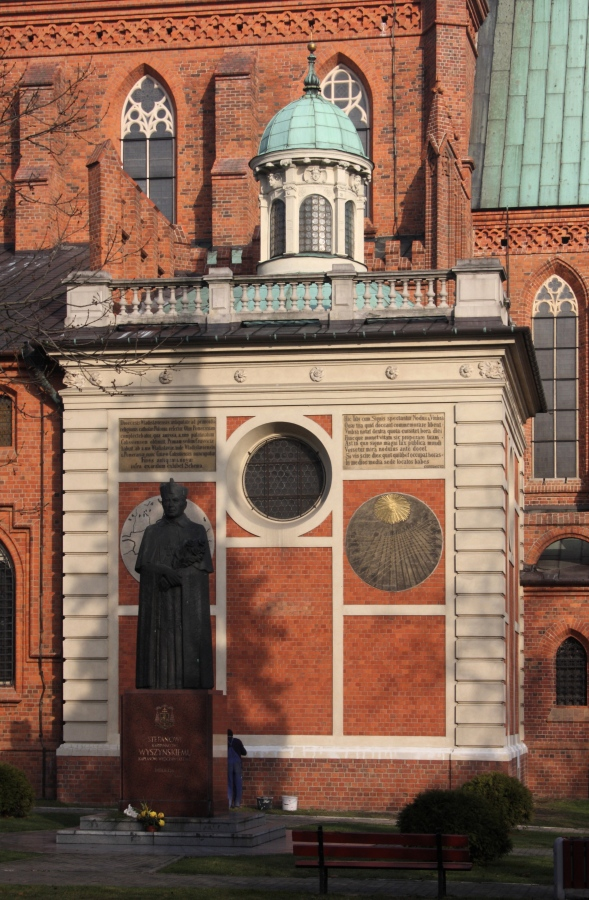
Mannerist Chapel of the Blessed Virgin Mary, exterior reconstructed in the late nineteenth century

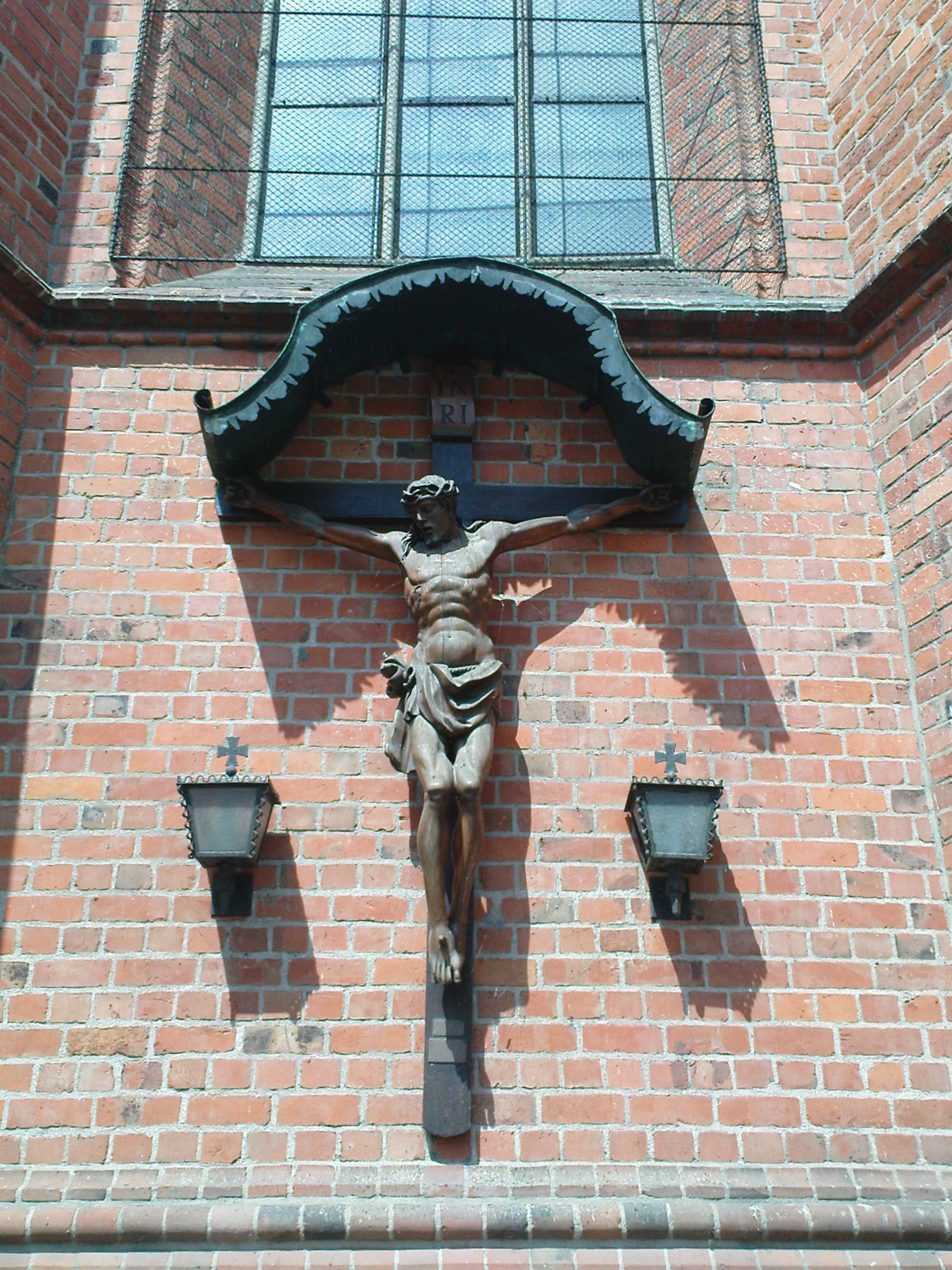
Crucifix on the northern wall of the temple

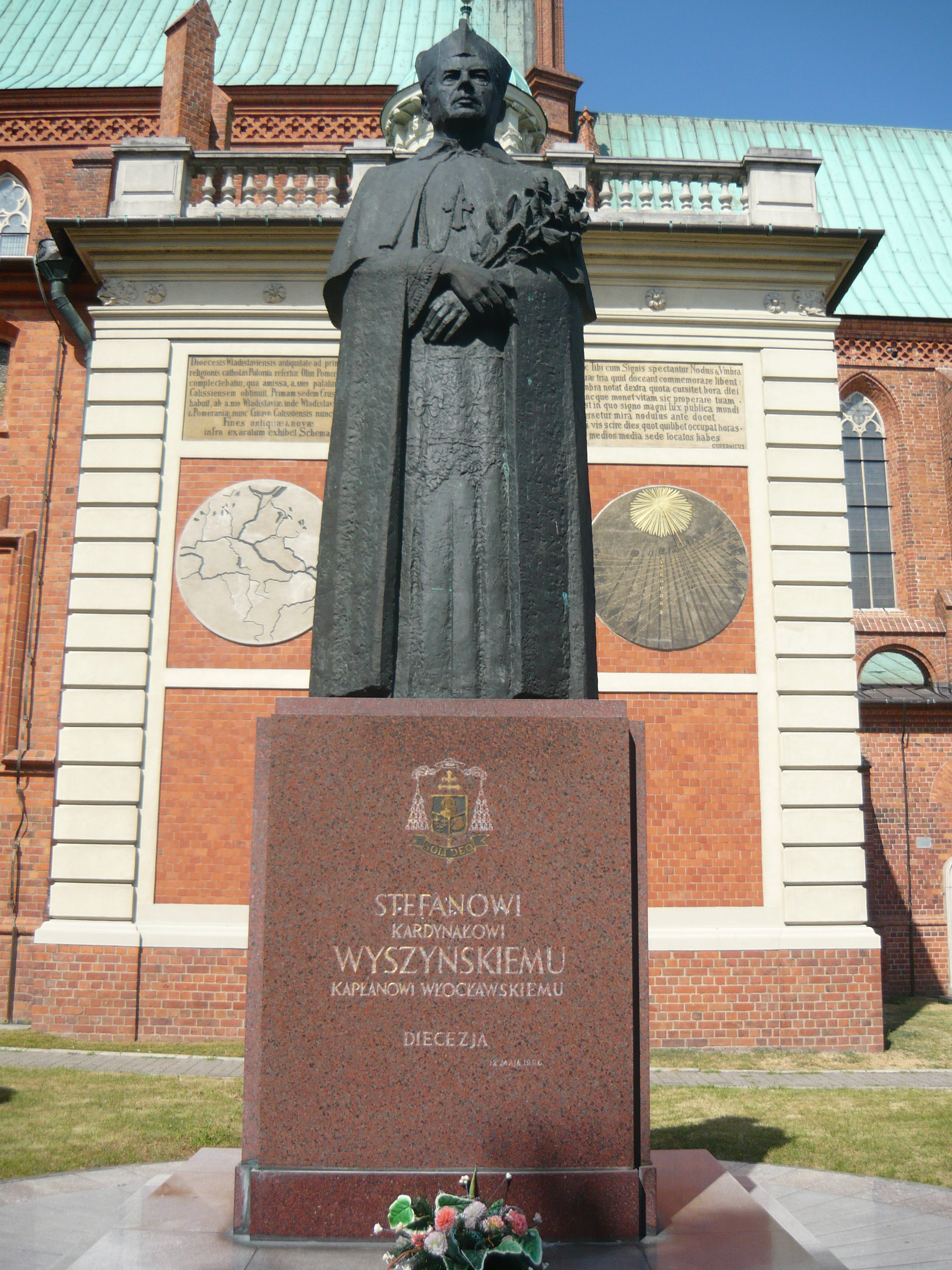
Stefan Wyszyński monument

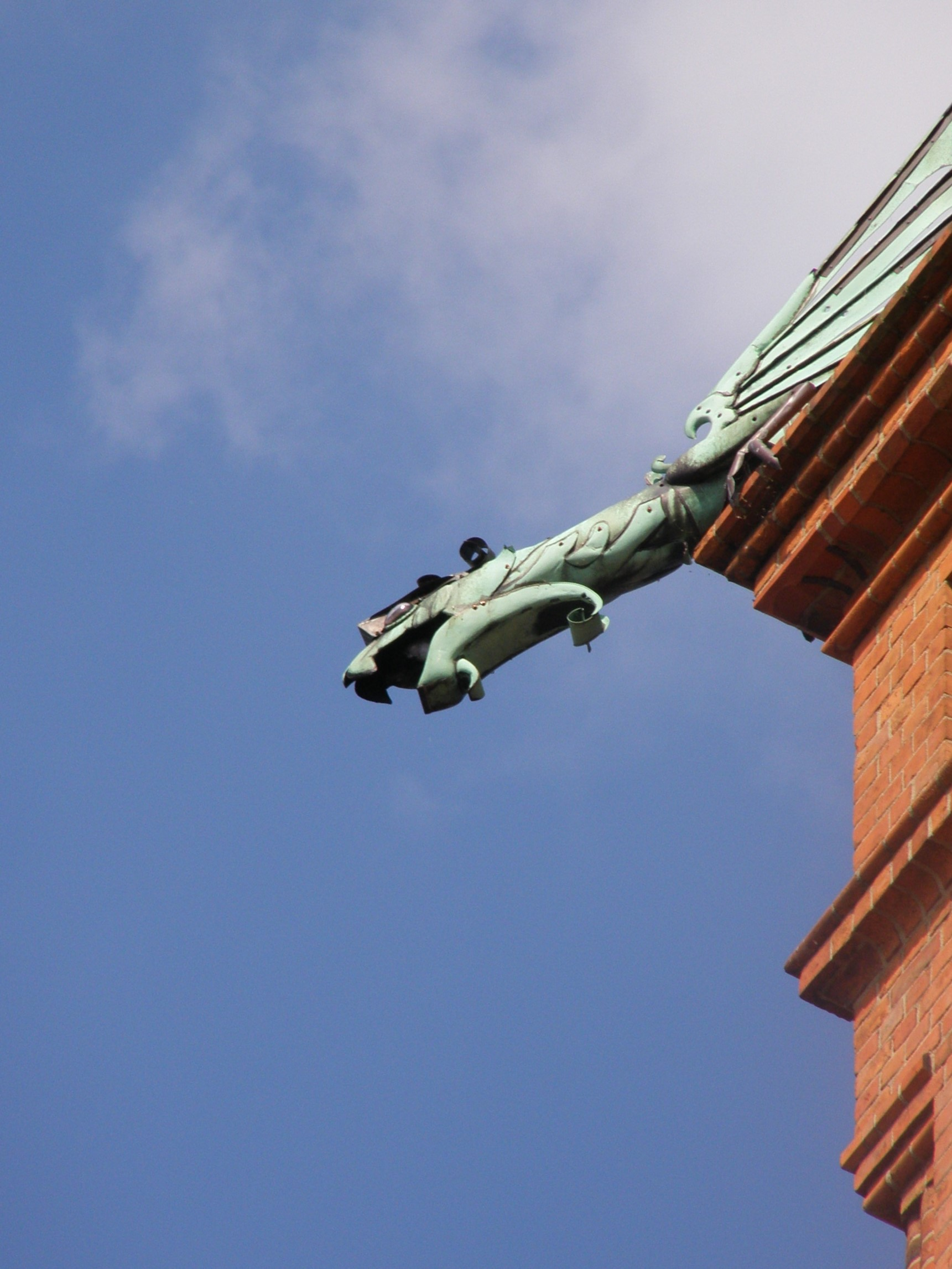
Gargoyle

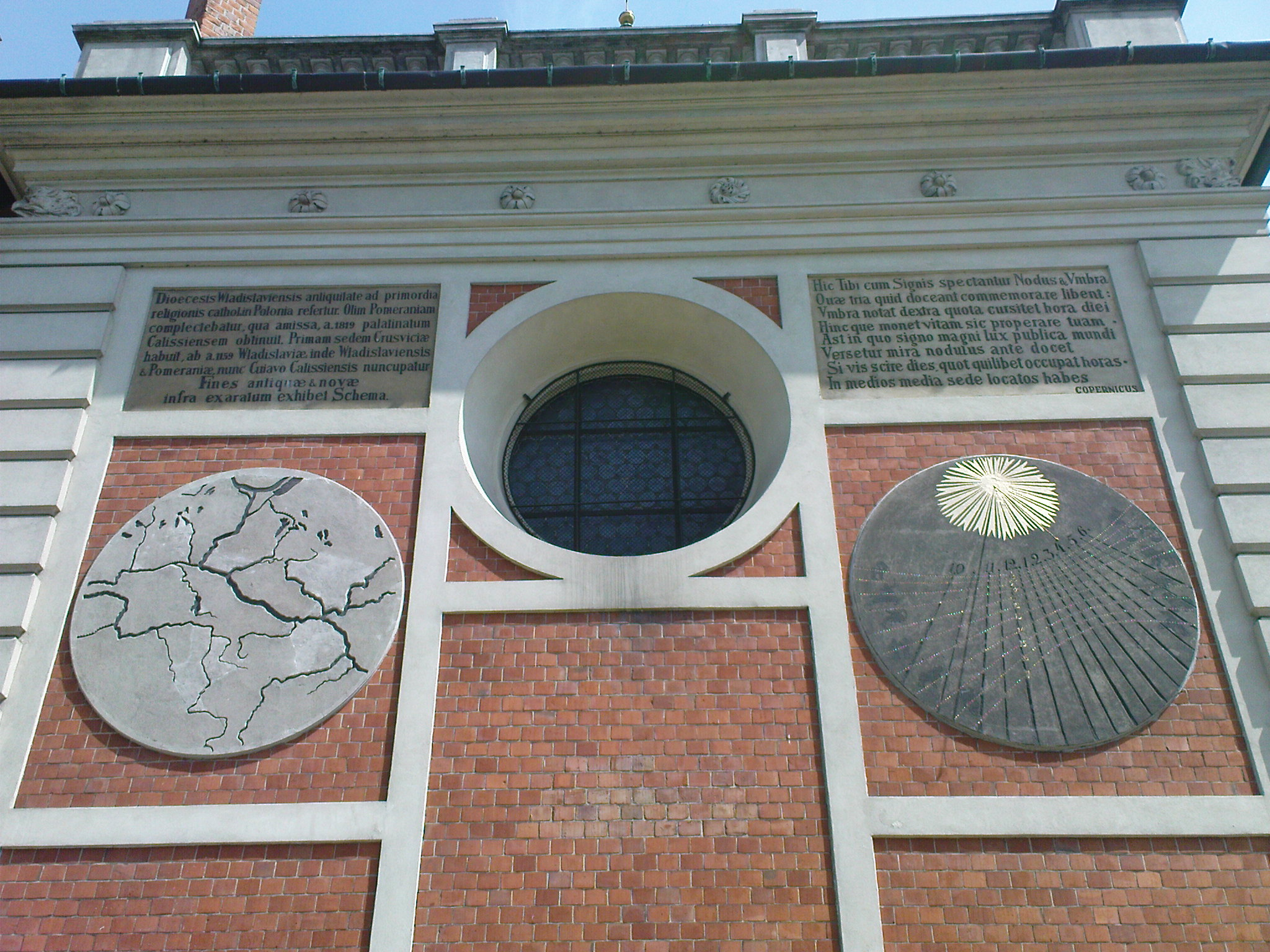
Copernican Wall

Włocławek cathedral from Henryk Sienkiewicz Park

== Bibliography ==
- Szczęsny Skibiński, Polskie katedry gotyckie, Poznań 1996, p. 131–137.
- Piotr Pajor, Joanna Utzig, „Godny miana katedry. O genezie formy architektonicznej kościoła katedralnego we Włocławku”, Folia Historiae Artium, Seria Nowa, t.14: 2016 / PL ISSN 0071-6723.
- Joanna Utzig, Witraże w katedrze we Włocławku w kontekście stylu malarstwa południowoniemieckiego pierwszej połowy XIV wieku, Folia Historiae Artium, 13, 2015.
- Piotr Nowakowski, Architektura katedry we Włocławku, mps pracy magisterskiej napisanej pod kierunkiem doc. S. Skibińskiego, UMK Toruń 1988 (niepublikowana).
- M. Machowski, A. Włodarek, Włocławek. Kościół katedralny pw. Panny Marii, [w:] „Architektura gotycka w Polsce”, t. 2: Katalog zabytków, red. T. Mroczko, M. Arszyński, Warszawa 1995 (Dzieje sztuki polskiej, 2), p. 259.
- W. Łuszczkiewicz, Katedra Włocławska i projekt p. Stryjeńskiego jej restauracyi, „Czasopismo Techniczne”, 1, 1883, nr 5, nr 6.
- Jacek Kowalski (Der Dom in Leslau/Włocławek), [w:] Mittelalterliche Architektur in Polen. Romanische und gotische Baukunst zwischen Oder und Weichsel, t. 1, red. Ch. Herrmann, D. von Winterfeld, Petersberg 2015, p. 298.
