= Kozin =

Kozin may refer to the following localities:

- Kozin, Lubusz Voivodeship (west Poland)
- Kozin, Masovian Voivodeship (east-central Poland)
- Kozin, Pomeranian Voivodeship (north Poland)
- Kozin, Warmian-Masurian Voivodeship (north Poland)
- Kozyn, a town in Ukraine
- Kozin (surname)
