= Arnold Gohr =

German trade unionist and politician (1896–1983)

Arnold Gohr (12 October 1896 – 23 January 1983) was a German clerical worker who became a trade unionist and activist. After 1945 he entered mainstream politics in East Berlin. As the Soviet occupation zone evolved into a Soviet sponsored one-party dictatorship, he never joined the ruling party, remaining instead a leading "collaborationist" member of the eastern version of the Christian Democratic Union (CDU party). He became a party chairman and served between 1948 and 1958 as "deputy lord mayor" ("stellvertretender Oberbürgermeister") of Berlin, a period during which the increasingly divided city's constitutional status and future were contentious and ambiguous on a number of different levels.

== Life ==
=== Provenance and early years ===
Arnold Gohr was born in Wottnogge (as Otnoga was known before) 1945), a small village at one end of the "Jassener See" (small lake) and alongside the little Lupow river, a short distance inland to the west of Danzig. His father was a small-scale farmer. Gohr attended the village school in nearby Saviat and then went on to secondary schools, first in Lauenburg and subsequently in Schlawe. School was followed by a commercial apprenticeship which he completed, and which provided a sound basis for office employment. He then worked, between 1914 and 1916, as a dispatch clerk and as a bookkeeper. Conscripted for military service in 1916, he was captured and held as a prisoner of war till 1920.

=== "Weimar" years ===
Between 1920 and 1933 Gohr was a member of the Gewerkschaftsbund der Angestellten (GWB), a clerical workers' trades union that was at the liberal end of the political spectrum. He was also a member of an association of war wounded ex-servicemen and, from 1920 till 1933, of the centre-left Democratic Party ("Deutsche Demokratische Partei" / DDP) and of its short-lived more nationalistic successor organisation, the National Party (" Deutsche Staatspartei" / DStP). (Note: The National Party (" Deutsche Staatspartei") may also be identified in sources as the National Popular Association ("Volksnationale Reichsvereinigung"/ VNR) which was its name at launch in early 1930, and for approximately the first three months of its existence.) For some years, till 1945, he worked as a "prokurist" (loosely, "administrator / representative") and head of department for the Berlin-based National Nitrogen Syndicate ("Deutsches Stickstoff-Syndikat" / DSS), an internationally powerful (at least during its early decades) cartel association dominated by IG Farben and other (for the most part German) multi-national businesses operating in the chemicals and pharmaceuticals sectors.

=== Soviet occupation zone and the CDU ===
In 1945 Gohr was a co-founder of the Christian Democratic Union (CDU party) branch for Berlin-Köpenick. The new party was intended to represent a broad range of centre-right political opinion and to reduce the risk of another take-over by anti-democratic forces being facilitated by political divisions among political moderates. Gohr worked for the "Deutsche Düngerzentrale" (which until its dissolution in 1949 was a national body involved with fertiliser) and became a member of the FDGB ("Freier Deutsche Gewerkschaftsbund" / "Free German Trade Union Federation") which was emerging in the Soviet occupation zone (but not in the other three occupation zones to the south and west) as the national monopoly trades union organisation. 1949 was also the year during which the area administered since May 1945 as the Soviet occupation zone, formally in October of that year, as the Soviet sponsored German Democratic Republic (East Germany). Between April 1948 and June 1949 Arnold Gohr served as deputy party regional chairman for the East Berlin region. He then took over from Helmut Brandt as regional CDU party leader for the eastern half of the city, serving in this post till August 1952.

In 1952 the East German government, keen to centralise political power more effectively, abolished a regional tier of government: changes were naturally made to party administrative structures that reflected this. It turned out that Arnold Gohr had been the last chairman of the CDU for East Berlin. In terms of its administrative structure, however, as in many other respects, Berlin remained something a "special case". Between 1952 and 1954 Arnold Gohr served as a member of the party regional executive ("Bezirksvorstand") for Berlin. He was already, between 1948 and 1964 a member of the CDU (East Germany) party executive committee ("Hauptvorstand").

=== City government ===
In 1946 Gohr was elected a Berlin city councillor. He then served, between 1948 and 1958, as "deputy lord mayor" ("stellvertretender Oberbürgermeister").

=== National "parliament" ===
During 1948/49 Arnold Gohr was a member of the so-called People's Council ("Deutscher Volksrat"), a consultative assembly in the Soviet occupation zone which from an Anglo-American perspective could be presented as the precursor to a western-style parliament. Its principal function was to draw up and endorse a new constitution, based on a draft presented back in 1946 by the newly created Socialist Unity Party ("Sozialistische Einheitspartei Deutschlands" / SED). With the 1948 currency reforms, which expressly excluded the Soviet zone and the ensuing drama of the eleven-month Berlin Blockade, it became clear that perpetuating occupied Germany's postwar status quo was no longer an option. After a constitution for a "democratic German Republic" had been endorsed by the People's Council at the start of June 1949, on 7 October 1949 the council's membership formed the basis for a Provisional People's Chamber ("Provisorische Volkskammer"). The event also marked the formal launch of the so-called German Democratic Republic. Arnold Gohr was a member. As before, his appointment as one of 66 "Berlin representatives" ("Berliner Vertreter") placed him in a constitutionally distinctive category from that filled by the 400 members representing parties and interest groups from other parts of the occupation zone / East Germany. As before he represented not the ruling SED party but the CDU, which by this stage had become a relatively quiescent component in the "National Front", a structural alliance of political parties and approved mass organisations controlled by the ruling party. Volkskammer seats were allocated not on the basis of election results, but according to a predetermined quota. These arrangements had been imposed in the face of opposition from several prominent CDU founding leaders in the east such as Jakob Kaiser Ernst Lemmer, Walther Schreiber and Andreas Hermes. It turned out that such men had no political future in East Germany, and most soon moved across to the west. Other members of the CDU leadership team turned out to be more pragmatic and accommodating. These men's political careers survived in East Germany. Arnold Gohr was one of them. He remained a CDU member of the Volkskammer, representing (east) Berlin, till 1963.

=== Other appointments ===
Under the highly centralised power Leninist constitutional structure applied in Soviet dominated central Europe after 1945, political power was concentrated in the ruling party, and within the ruling party on the party central committee. That left very little power in the hands of the Volkskammer. The position was complicated, by the fact that Volkskammer membership was frequently combined with other more time-consuming appointments and memberships which carried greater political weight and influence. Between 1950 and 1954 Gohr was a member of the National Council ("Nationalrat") controlling the constitutionally important National Front. He also joined, in 1953, the Vereinigung der gegenseitigen Bauernhilfe ("Farmers' Mutual Aid Association" / VdgB), a government approved mass organization for those involved in agriculture. In 1957 he became a member of the Association of German Cities ("Deutscher Städtetag"). In 1957 he became a member of the Greater Berlin regional executive of the Society for German–Soviet Friendship. In 1958 he became secretary to the German-French Society, joining the organisation's presidium in 1962.

== Recognition (selection) ==
- 1955 Patriotic Order of Merit in silver
- 1961 Otto Nutschke Badge of Honour in gold
- 1981 Patriotic Order of Merit in gold
