= Żbikowski =

Żbikowski or Zbikowski (feminine: Żbikowska, plural: Żbikowscy) is a Polish family name, derived from the word żbik, meaning wildcat. Notable people with the surname include:

- Mark Zbikowski (born 1956), Microsoft architect
- Tadeusz Żbikowski (1930–1989), Polish Sinologist
- Tom Zbikowski (born 1985), American football player
- Fred Shields (soccer player) (born Ferdinand Zbikowski; 1912–1985), American soccer player
- Beata Żbikowska (born 1934), Polish Olympic athlete

== See also ==
- Żbik (disambiguation)
