= Jerzkowice railway station =

Railway station in Jerzkowice, Poland

Jerzkowice

General information
- Location: Jerzkowice; Poland
- Coordinates: 54.3°N 17.6°E
- Owner: Polskie Koleje Państwowe S.A.

Construction
- Structure type: Building: Pulled down Depot: Never existed Water tower: Never existed

History
- Former names: Jerskewitz until 1945
Location
- Location within Pomeranian Voivodeship Location within Poland

Jerzkowice is a non-operational PKP railway station in Jerzkowice (Pomeranian Voivodeship), Poland.

== Lines crossing the station ==
Start station	End station	Line type
Lębork	Bytów	Closed
