= Wężewo =

Wężewo may refer to the following places:

- Wężewo, Masovian Voivodeship (east-central Poland)
- Wężewo, Olecko County in Warmian-Masurian Voivodeship (north Poland)
- Wężewo, Pisz County in Warmian-Masurian Voivodeship (north Poland)
