= Kurówko =

Kurówko may refer to the following places:

- Kurówko, Przasnysz County in Masovian Voivodeship (north-central Poland)
- Kurówko, Sierpc County in Masovian Voivodeship (north-central Poland)
- Kurówko, West Pomeranian Voivodeship (north-west Poland)
