= Obrowo =

Obrowo may refer to the following places:

- Obrowo, Toruń County in Kuyavian-Pomeranian Voivodeship (north-central Poland)
- Obrowo, Tuchola County in Kuyavian-Pomeranian Voivodeship (north-central Poland)
- Obrowo, Gmina Czarna Dąbrówka in Pomeranian Voivodeship (north Poland)
- Obrowo, Gmina Miastko in Pomeranian Voivodeship (north Poland)
- Obrowo, Greater Poland Voivodeship (west-central Poland)
