= Czarna Dąbrówka =

- Village
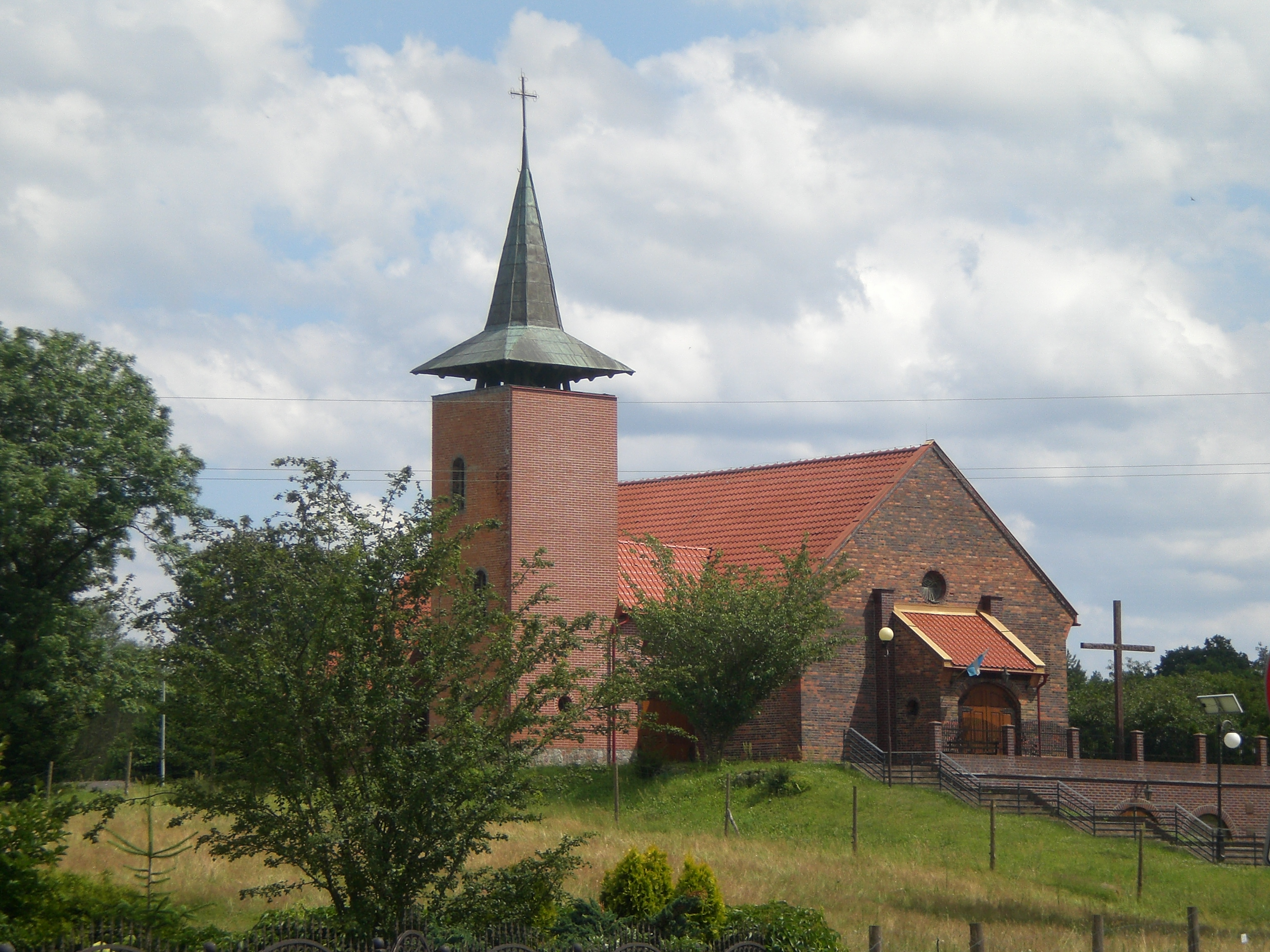
- Church of Saint Stanislaus Kostka

- Location within Poland
- Coordinates: 54°21′N 17°33′E
- Country: Poland
- Voivodeship: Pomeranian
- County: Bytów
- Gmina: Czarna Dąbrówka

Population
  - Total: 1,112
- Time zone: UTC+1 (CET)
  - Summer (DST): UTC+2 (CEST)
- Vehicle registration: GBY

Czarna Dąbrówka [ˈt͡ʂarna dɔmˈbrufka] (German: Schwarz Damerkow) is a village in Bytów County, Pomeranian Voivodeship, in northern Poland.

== Etymology ==
This is a topographic name of Slavic origin, after the word dąbrowa or dąbrówka, which means "oak forest", prevalent for many settlements in Poland, with the word Czarna ("Black") added only in the 19th century.

== History ==
The settlement was founded by the Teutonic Knights in 1346 as Damerkow. It was first inhabited by Kashubian people. From 1457 Damerkow and the nearby village of Kleschinz (Kleszczyniec) were owned by Martin von Puttkamer, and from 1517 by the noble family of Zitzewitz. In the 16th and 17th centuries it was a possession at different times of the noble families of Lettow, Wobesen, and Stojentin

According to a history by Brüggemann, in 1784 the village had one farm, six tenants, five cottagers and fifteen households. At this time there were two separate properties, Damerkow "A", consisting of a farm, with two tenants and four cottagers, which was in the possession of Captain J. W. von Puttkamer, and Damerkow "B", with four tenants and one cottager, known as Niemietzke (now Podkomorzyce), in the ownership of Johann Christian Ernst von Puttkamer.

In 1800 Johann von Zeromski became the owner of Schwarz Damerkow. Waldemar von Puttkamer bought the property from Zeromski, but Puttkamer continued to own it only until 1864. The last proprietors of Schwarz Damerkow mentioned in the estates book (Güteradreßbuch) are:

1884 - Alexander Schulze
1910 - Ikier
1928 - Harry Ikier
1938 - Hertha Ikier.

At this time the property consisted of 300 hectares (740 acres) of arable land, including 235 hectares (580 acres) of arable fields, 35 hectares (86 acres) of meadows, 5 hectares (12 acres) of woods, uncultivated land, yards, and roads, and 20 hectares (49 acres) of water. The average land tax per hectare was 3.08 Reichsmark. Schwarz Damerkow was the economic centre of the south-east part of the County of Stolp (Słupsk).
