= Kostroga railway station =

Railway station in Poland

Kostroga

General information
- Location: Kostroga; Poland
- Coordinates: 54.3803°N 17.6503°E
- Owner: Polskie Koleje Państwowe S.A.

Construction
- Structure type: Building: Pulled down Depot: Never existed Water tower: Never existed

History
- Former names: Holenenhof until 1945
Location

Kostroga is a non-operational PKP railway station in Kostroga (Pomeranian Voivodeship), Poland.

== Lines crossing the station ==
Start station	End station	Line type
Lębork	Bytów	Closed
