= Czarna Dąbrówka railway station =

Railway station in Poland

Coordinates: 54.3544°N 17.5717°E

Czarna Dąbrówka

General information
- Location: Czarna Dąbrówka; Poland
- Owner: Polskie Koleje Państwowe S.A.
- Platforms: 3

Construction
- Structure type: Building: Yes (no longer used); Depot: Never existed Water tower: No

History
- Former names: Holenenhof until 1945
Location
- Location within Pomeranian Voivodeship Location within Poland

Czarna Dąbrówka is a non-operational PKP railway station in Czarna Dąbrówka (Pomeranian Voivodeship), Poland.

== Lines crossing the station ==
Start station	End station	Line type
Lębork	Bytów	Closed
