= Jasień railway station =

Railway station in Pomeranian Voivodeship, Poland

Coordinates: 54.3275°N 17.5939°E

Jasień

General information
- Location: Jasień; Poland
- Owner: Polskie Koleje Państwowe S.A.

Construction
- Structure type: Building: Pulled down Depot: Never existed Water tower: Never existed

History
- Former names: Jassener See until 1945
Location

Jasień is a non-operational PKP railway station in Jasień (Pomeranian Voivodeship), Poland.

== Lines crossing the station ==
Start station	End station	Line type
Lębork	Bytów	Closed
