= Glisnica =

Glisnica may refer to:

- Glisnica, Montenegro
- Gliśnica, Greater Poland Voivodeship, Poland
- Gliśnica, Pomeranian Voivodeship, Poland
