= Będzieszyn =

Będzieszyn may refer to the following places:

- Będzieszyn, Greater Poland Voivodeship (west-central Poland)
- Będzieszyn, Bytów County in Pomeranian Voivodeship (north Poland)
- Będzieszyn, Gdańsk County in Pomeranian Voivodeship (north Poland)
