= Żbik =

Żbik ("wildcat" in Polish) or Zbik may refer to:

- ORP Żbik, a Polish submarine
- Kapitan Żbik a Polish comic book series and hero
- Żbik Group, a group of conspiracy military units of Polish Armia Krajowa
- Mieczysław Kawalec (nom de guerre "Żbik"), a Polish resistance fighter
- Lake Żbik, Poland
- Sebastian Zbik, a German boxer

== See also ==
- Żbiki
- Żbikowski
