= Przylaski, Pomeranian Voivodeship =

Przylaski
- Settlement
- Location within Poland
- Coordinates: 54°16′33″N 17°38′38″E
- Country: Poland
- Voivodeship: Pomeranian
- County: Bytów
- Gmina: Czarna Dąbrówka

Przylaski [pʂɨˈlaski] is a settlement in the administrative district of Gmina Czarna Dąbrówka, within Bytów County, Pomeranian Voivodeship, in northern Poland.
