= Bochówko =

- Village
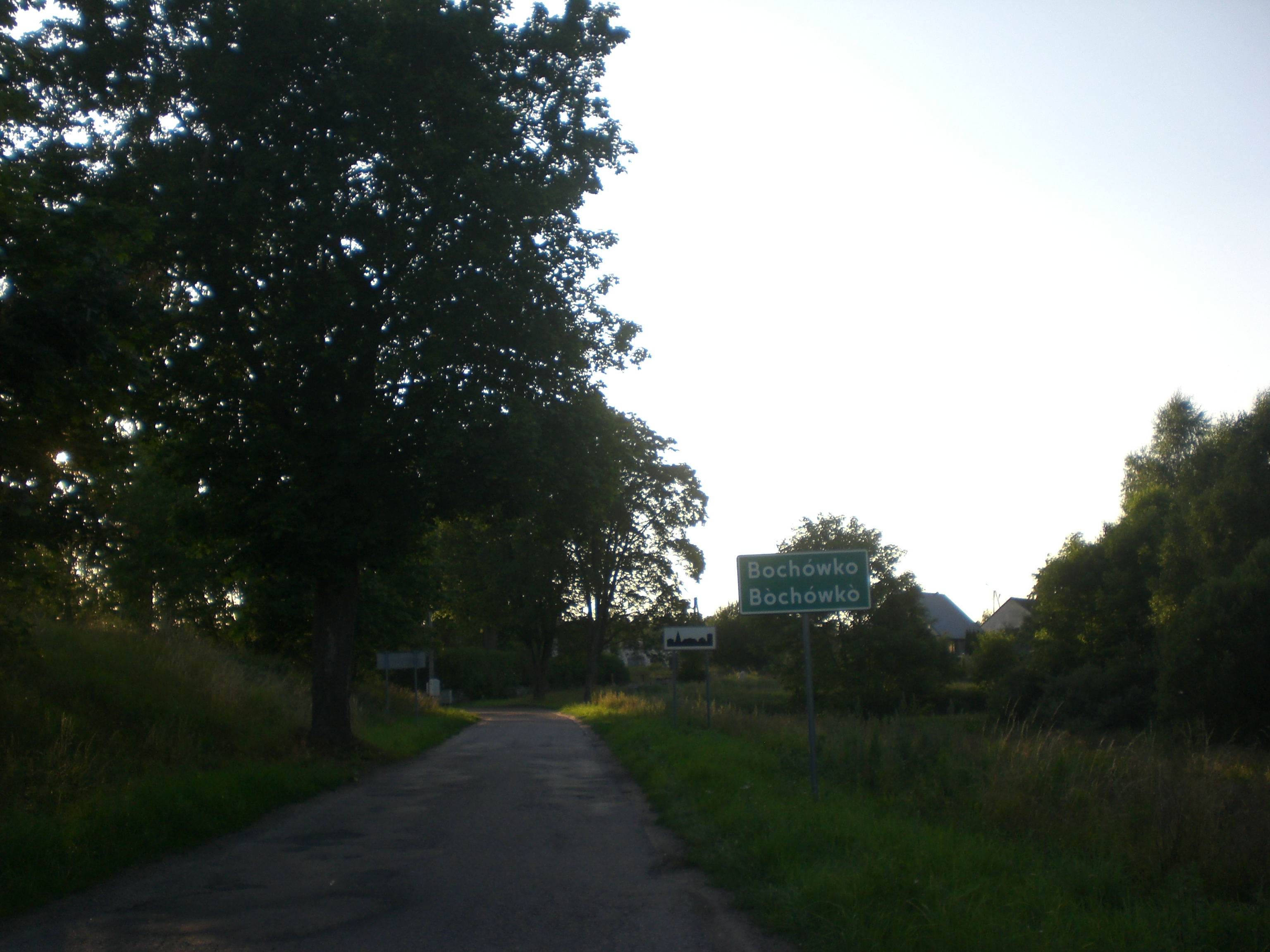

- Location within Poland
- Coordinates: 54°22′11″N 17°42′5″E
- Country: Poland
- Voivodeship: Pomeranian
- County: Bytów
- Gmina: Czarna Dąbrówka

Population
  - Total: 114
- Postal code: 77-116

Bochówko [bɔˈxufkɔ] (German: Bochowke) is a village in the administrative district of Gmina Czarna Dąbrówka, within Bytów County, Pomeranian Voivodeship, in northern Poland. It is located in the historic region of Pomerania.
