= Kozy, Pomeranian Voivodeship =

Kozy
- Village
- Location within Poland
- Coordinates: 54°23′48″N 17°36′45″E
- Country: Poland
- Voivodeship: Pomeranian
- County: Bytów
- Gmina: Czarna Dąbrówka
- Population: 344

Kozy [ˈkɔzɨ] (German: Kose) is a village in the administrative district of Gmina Czarna Dąbrówka, within Bytów County, Pomeranian Voivodeship, in northern Poland.

== Notable residents ==
- Gustav Bogislav von Münchow (1686–1766), Prussian general
