= Jaszewo =

- Settlement
- Location within Poland
- Coordinates: 54°15′14″N 17°33′59″E
- Country: Poland
- Voivodeship: Pomeranian
- County: Bytów
- Gmina: Czarna Dąbrówka

Jaszewo [jaˈʂɛvɔ] is a settlement in the administrative district of Gmina Czarna Dąbrówka, within Bytów County, Pomeranian Voivodeship, in northern Poland.
