= Rokity, Pomeranian Voivodeship =

Rokity
- Village
- Location within Poland
- Coordinates: 54°20′14″N 17°41′6″E
- Country: Poland
- Voivodeship: Pomeranian
- County: Bytów
- Gmina: Czarna Dąbrówka
- Population: 493

Rokity [rɔˈkitɨ] (German: Groß Rakitt) is a village in the administrative district of Gmina Czarna Dąbrówka, within Bytów County, Pomeranian Voivodeship, in northern Poland.
