= Gmina Krasne, Masovian Voivodeship =

Gmina Krasne Krasne Commune
- Gmina
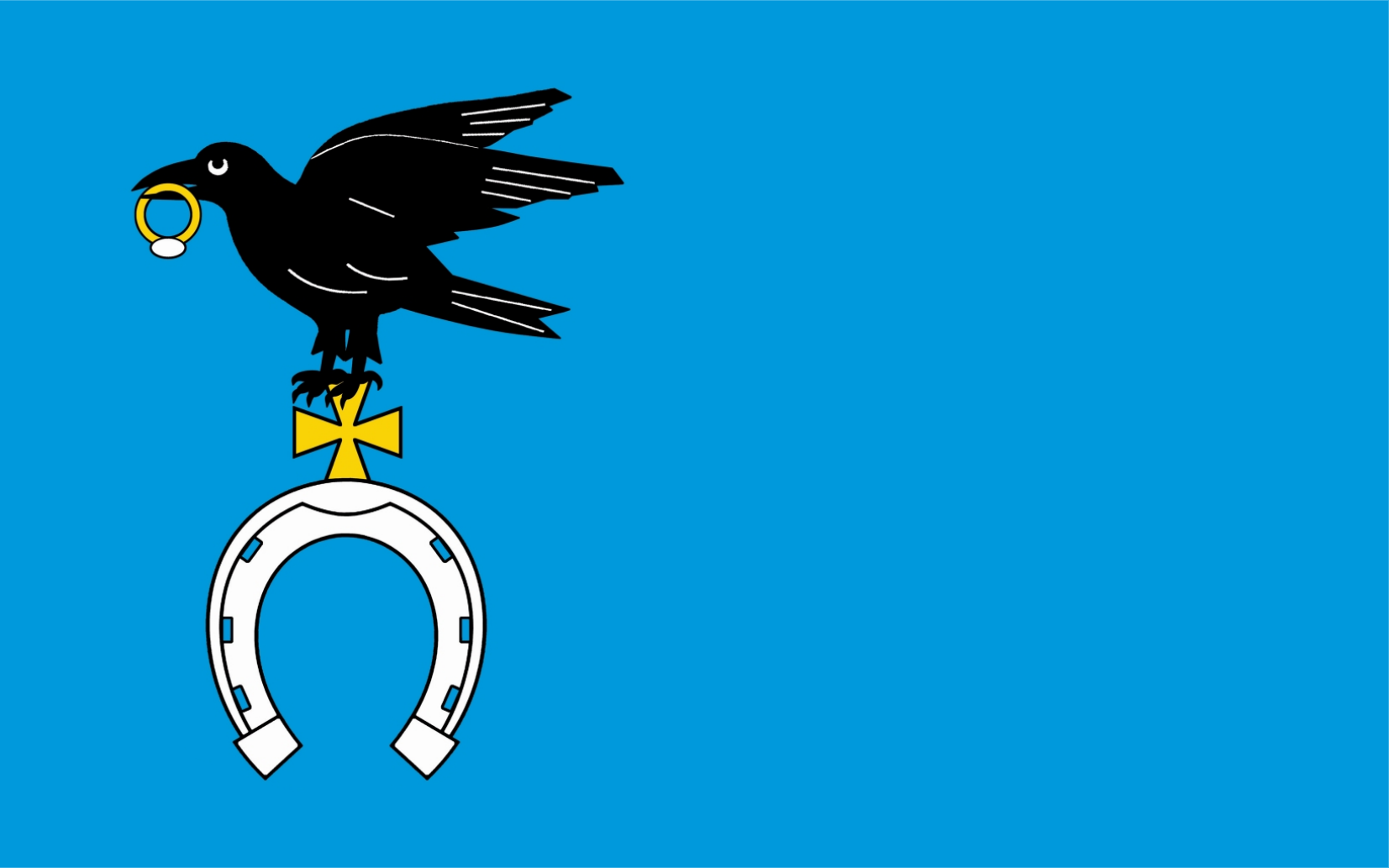
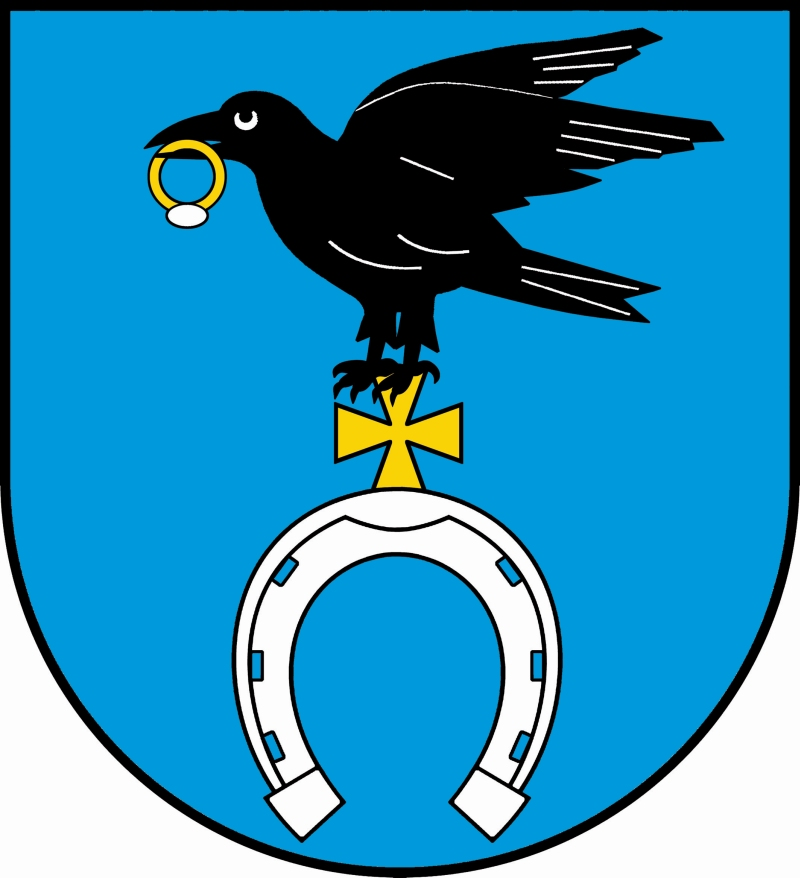
- Flag Coat of arms
- Interactive map of Gmina Krasne
- Coordinates (Krasne): 52°55′16″N 20°58′8″E
- Country: Poland
- Voivodeship: Masovian
- County: Przasnysz
- Seat: Krasne

Area
  - Total: 100.94 km^{2} (38.97 sq mi)

Population (2013)
  - Total: 3,783
  - Density: 37.48/km^{2} (97.07/sq mi)
- Website: http://www.krasne.pl/

Gmina Krasne is a rural gmina (administrative district) in Przasnysz County, Masovian Voivodeship, in east-central Poland. Its seat is the village of Krasne, which lies approximately 13 kilometres (8 mi) south-east of Przasnysz and 79 km (49 mi) north of Warsaw.

The gmina covers an area of 100.94 square kilometres (39.0 sq mi), and as of 2006 its total population is 3,841 (3,783 in 2013).

== Villages ==
Gmina Krasne contains the villages and settlements of Augustów, Barańce, Bartołdy, Brzozowo Małe, Brzozowo Wielkie, Dąbki, Dębowa Karczma, Filipy, Godacze, Gorąca, Grabówko, Grabowo Gęsie, Grabowo Wielkie, Gustawin, Helenów, Iłówko, Jaźwiny, Kamienice-Ślesice, Kozin, Kraski-Ślesice, Krasne, Krasne-Elżbiecin, Kurówko, Kurowo, Łyszkowo, Milewo-Brzegędy, Milewo-Bylice, Milewo-Gawary, Milewo-Kulki, Milewo-Rączki, Milewo-Ruszczyny, Milewo-Szwejki, Milewo-Tabuły, Mosaki-Rukle, Mosaki-Stara Wieś, Niesiobędy, Nowa Wieś, Nowe Żmijewo, Nowokrasne, Pęczki-Kozłowo, Stary Janin, Szlasy-Leszcze, Szlasy-Umiemy, Szlasy-Żalne, Wężewo, Zalesie, Żbiki, Żbiki-Antosy, Żbiki-Gawronki, Żbiki-Kierzki, Żbiki-Starki, Zielona and Zielonki.

== Neighbouring gminas ==
Gmina Krasne is bordered by the gminas of Czernice Borowe, Gołymin-Ośrodek, Karniewo, Opinogóra Górna, Płoniawy-Bramura and Przasnysz.
