= Grabowo Wielkie =

- Village
- Location within Poland
- Coordinates: 52°54′40″N 20°50′10″E
- Country: Poland
- Voivodeship: Masovian
- County: Przasnysz
- Gmina: Krasne

Grabowo Wielkie [ɡraˈbɔvɔ ˈvjɛlkʲɛ] is a village in the administrative district of Gmina Krasne, within Przasnysz County, Masovian Voivodeship, in east-central Poland.
