= Rokiciny, Pomeranian Voivodeship =

Rokiciny
- Village
- Location within Poland
- Coordinates: 54°20′54″N 17°42′39″E
- Country: Poland
- Voivodeship: Pomeranian
- County: Bytów
- Gmina: Czarna Dąbrówka
- Population: 282

Rokiciny [rɔkiˈt͡ɕinɨ] (German: Neurakitt) is a village in the administrative district of Gmina Czarna Dąbrówka, within Bytów County, Pomeranian Voivodeship, in northern Poland.
