= Mosaki-Rukle =

- Village
- Location within Poland
- Coordinates: 52°53′26″N 20°56′07″E
- Country: Poland
- Voivodeship: Masovian
- County: Przasnysz
- Gmina: Krasne

Mosaki-Rukle [mɔˈsaki ˈruklɛ] is a village in the administrative district of Gmina Krasne, within Przasnysz County, Masovian Voivodeship, in east-central Poland.
