= Mikorowo =

- Village
- Location within Poland
- Coordinates: 54°24′51″N 17°34′48″E
- Country: Poland
- Voivodeship: Pomeranian
- County: Bytów
- Gmina: Czarna Dąbrówka
- Elevation: 99.2 m (325 ft)
- Population: 256

Mikorowo [mikɔˈrɔvɔ] (German: Mickrow) is a village in the administrative district of Gmina Czarna Dąbrówka, within Bytów County, Pomeranian Voivodeship, in northern Poland.
