= Czarnolesie, Pomeranian Voivodeship =

Czarnolesie
- Village
- Location within Poland
- Coordinates: 54°20′57″N 17°37′59″E
- Country: Poland
- Voivodeship: Pomeranian
- County: Bytów
- Gmina: Czarna Dąbrówka

Czarnolesie [t͡ʂarnɔˈlɛɕɛ] is a village in the administrative district of Gmina Czarna Dąbrówka, within Bytów County, Pomeranian Voivodeship, in northern Poland.
