= Milewo-Rączki =

- Village
- Location within Poland
- Coordinates: 52°53′42″N 20°51′59″E
- Country: Poland
- Voivodeship: Masovian
- County: Przasnysz
- Gmina: Krasne

Milewo-Rączki [miˈlɛvɔ ˈrɔnt͡ʂki] is a village in the administrative district of Gmina Krasne, within Przasnysz County, Masovian Voivodeship, in east-central Poland.
