= Skotawsko =

- Settlement
- Location within Poland
- Coordinates: 54°17′42″N 17°31′16″E
- Country: Poland
- Voivodeship: Pomeranian
- County: Bytów
- Gmina: Czarna Dąbrówka

Skotawsko [skɔˈtafskɔ] is a settlement in the administrative district of Gmina Czarna Dąbrówka, within Bytów County, Pomeranian Voivodeship, in northern Poland.
