= Osowskie =

- Village
- Location within Poland
- Coordinates: 54°19′1″N 17°32′34″E
- Country: Poland
- Voivodeship: Pomeranian
- County: Bytów
- Gmina: Czarna Dąbrówka
- Population: 40

Osowskie [ɔˈsɔfskʲɛ] is a village in the administrative district of Gmina Czarna Dąbrówka, within Bytów County, Pomeranian Voivodeship, in northern Poland.
