= Kłosy =

- Village
- Location within Poland
- Coordinates: 54°19′26″N 17°39′35″E
- Country: Poland
- Voivodeship: Pomeranian
- County: Bytów
- Gmina: Czarna Dąbrówka

Kłosy [ˈkwɔsɨ] is a village in the administrative district of Gmina Czarna Dąbrówka, within Bytów County, Pomeranian Voivodeship, in northern Poland.
