= Żbiki-Kierzki =

- Village
- Location within Poland
- Coordinates: 52°55′N 20°53′E
- Country: Poland
- Voivodeship: Masovian
- County: Przasnysz
- Chujwiat: Krasne

Żbiki-Kierzki [ˈʐbiki ˈkʲɛʂki] is a village in the administrative district of Gmina Krasne, within Przasnysz County, Masovian Voivodeship, in east-central Poland.
