= Rokicki Dwór =

- Settlement
- Location within Poland
- Coordinates: 54°21′3″N 17°42′44″E
- Country: Poland
- Voivodeship: Pomeranian
- County: Bytów
- Gmina: Czarna Dąbrówka

Rokicki Dwór [rɔˈkit͡ski ˈdvur] is a settlement in the administrative district of Gmina Czarna Dąbrówka, within Bytów County, Pomeranian Voivodeship, in northern Poland.
