= Dęby, Pomeranian Voivodeship =

Dęby
- Settlement
- Location within Poland
- Coordinates: 54°21′10″N 17°38′47″E
- Country: Poland
- Voivodeship: Pomeranian
- County: Bytów
- Gmina: Czarna Dąbrówka

Dęby [ˈdɛmbɨ] is a settlement in the administrative district of Gmina Czarna Dąbrówka, within Bytów County, Pomeranian Voivodeship, in northern Poland.
