= Szlasy-Żalne =

- Village
- Location within Poland
- Coordinates: 52°56′21″N 20°49′46″E
- Country: Poland
- Voivodeship: Masovian
- County: Przasnysz
- Gmina: Krasne

Szlasy-Żalne [ˈʂlasɨ ˈʐalnɛ] is a village in the administrative district of Gmina Krasne, within Przasnysz County, Masovian Voivodeship, in east-central Poland.
