= Milewo-Bylice =

- Village
- Location within Poland
- Coordinates: 52°53′48″N 20°52′09″E
- Country: Poland
- Voivodeship: Masovian
- County: Przasnysz
- Gmina: Krasne

Milewo-Bylice [miˈlɛvɔ bɨˈlit͡sɛ] is a village in the administrative district of Gmina Krasne, within Przasnysz County, Masovian Voivodeship, in east-central Poland.
