= Helmut Brandt (CDU politician in East Germany) =

Berlin city councillor and leading German politician of the CDU

- Born: 16 July 1911; Spandau, Berlin, Germany
- Died: 31 October 1998; Königswinter, North Rhine-Westphalia, Germany
- Occupations: Lawyer; Politician; Political detainee
- Political party: DVP; CDU; CSU

Helmut Alfred Brandt (16 July 1911 - 31 October 1998) was a Berlin city councillor and a leading German politician in the Christian Democratic Union (Christlich-Demokratische Union / CDU), a political party of the centre right.

After 1945 the eastern part of Berlin, where Brandt lived and worked, was administered as the Soviet occupation zone of what had been Germany. By 1949, when the occupation zone was relaunched as the German Democratic Republic (East Germany), it was in the process of becoming a second German one-party dictatorship. Helmut Brandt opposed manifestations of this development: he was ousted from his job with the ministry of Justice and his position as a member of the CDU party leadership team. On 6 September 1950 he was arrested, although he would have to wait another four years for any sort of trial. He was accused of activities hostile to the state ("staatsfeindlicher Arbeit") and he spent the years between 1950 and 1964 in prison.

== Life ==
=== Early years ===
Brandt was born in Berlin's Spandau quarter. At university he studied jurisprudence and public law, obtaining doctorates in both related disciplines, following which he took a job with Deutsche Bank. In the meantime, in 1929 he joined the German People's Party (Deutsche Volkspartei / DVP), undertaking secretarial duties for the party in the Reichstag from 1931 until 1933, when a change of regime led to the DVP being outlawed. Following a brief period working at the Kaiser Wilhelm Institute for public law (Kaiser-Wilhelm-Institut für Völkerrecht), in 1938 Brandt joined a legal firm that specialised in matters involving international civil law.

War broke out in 1939 and Brandt fought as a member of the German army on both the eastern and western fronts. For some of the time he was based in Berlin, however, working at the Ministry for Military Procurement. War ended in May 1945 and almost immediately, in June 1945, he was able to return to Berlin and set himself up as a freelance lawyer, also taking a part-time teaching post at Berlin University.

=== Soviet occupation zone / German Democratic Republic ===
In 1945 there was a widespread assumption that the destruction of Nazi Germany should open the way for a return to multi-party democracy. Helmut Brandt was a founder member of the Christian Democratic Union (Christlich-Demokratische Union / CDU), intended as a slightly more broadly based version of the DVP that had existed before the abolition, in 1933, of parliamentary democracy. He quickly became the party's expert on legal issues. The next year, however, April 1946 saw the creation of a new political party within the Soviet occupation zone, the Socialist Unity Party of Germany (Sozialistische Einheitspartei Deutschlands / SED), formed through a contentious merger of the old German Communist Party and (many of the elements of) the more moderately left-wing Social Democratic Party. During the next few years the authorities sought to move towards a new one-party dictatorship, not by banning the other political parties but by controlling them. This was achieved by placing them all into an umbrella organisation known as the National Front and itself controlled by the SED (party). In the end it was only in the Soviet occupation zone (reinvented, formally in October 1949, as the German Democratic Republic / East Germany) that a return to single-party dictatorship was achieved, and even here implementation of the strategy was far from smooth, and stretched out over several years. With the CDU in his part of Germany increasingly under state pressure from without and infiltrated within, in 1948 Helmut Brandt joined the pro-Soviet District Federation ("Landesverband") in the eastern sector of Berlin. In West Berlin this led to accusations that he was leading a split of the CDU which still saw itself as a single political party across all the allied occupation zones in what was left of Germany after 1945. It was also in 1948 that Helmut Brandt was appointed as one of the 45 CDU members of the first Peoples' Assembly of the Soviet Occupation Zone and co-opted as a member of the assembly committee charged with drawing up a new constitution. By this time. however, the CDU leadership in the Soviet occupation zone was undergoing internal fragmentation, dividing those who, for various reasons, were prepared to collaborate, whether willingly or not, with the constitutional developments being implemented by the ruling SED (party) from those, such as Georg Dertinger and Helmut Brandt, who were less so. On account of his "bourgeois-conservative" propensities Brandt now found himself forced out of positions of influence within the CDU, notably by Arnold Gohr of the East German party's collaborationist wing. It was Gohr who replaced him as chairman of the District Federation ("Landesverband") in what was becoming known as the Soviet sector of Berlin.

In October 1949 Helmut Brandt was appointed as a secretary of state in the new country's Justice Ministry. In May 1950 he protested to his minister Max Fechner (SED) and to his own party leader in East Germany, Otto Nuschke (CDU) over the Waldheimer Trials, a succession of rapid legal hearings of 3,324 of people who had survived and been released from the hitherto unacknowledged Soviet controlled concentration camps. These now had their cases "processed" and were sentenced in "fast-track" hearings at which Brandt (and others) felt that justice was poorly served.

=== Arrest and imprisonment ===
In September 1950 he was arrested by people working for the Ministry for State Security (Stasi). Four years of "pre-trial detention" ensued, most of which he spent in an underground cell at the Stasi Hohenschönhausen detention centre. In 1953 he found himself arbitrarily linked by the Stasi with the "group of conspirators" connected with Georg Dertinger who was arrested at the start of that year, and in June 1954 the Supreme Court of East Germany sentenced Brandt, during a secret trial, to ten years of imprisonment for working against the state ("staatsfeindlicher Arbeit"). The ten-year sentence was later reduced, formally, to eight years, though as matters turned out he remained in prison, apart from a few days in 1958 till 1964.

By 1958 Brandt had been transferred to the super-jail at Bautzen from where he was released as an act of clemency in September. However, he was issued with a residency permit which required him to remain in the Dresden area. Thirty-six hours later he was re-arrested by the Stasi while trying to escape to West Berlin: his arrest resulted from a concern on the part of the authorities that he was about to speak to western journalists. A further trial took place, this time at Frankfurt (Oder) on 13 March 1959, at which Brandt received another ten-year jail sentence for crimes that included espionage, inducing people to escape from the German Democratic Republic, producing propaganda that endangered the state and treason.

=== Freedom ===
After 5,095 days in prison Helmut Brandt was released in August 1964. He was one of the first of approximately 34,000 East German political prisoners to have their freedom purchased by the West German government between 1964 and 1989 as part of a (at the time secret) scheme to try and compensate for East Germany's desperate shortage of cash. Brandt promptly relocated to the Rhineland region of West Germany, employed by various universities and working, till 1977, as an expert consultant to the government in Bonn. In the west he was prevented from resuming his political career with the CDU, but in 1977 joined its Bavarian sister party, the Christian Social Union (Christlich-Soziale Union in Bayern / CSU).

Following reunification Brandt devoted time and effort to researching the infamous Waldheimer Trials. In 1998 he died after a long illness at Königswinter, across the river from Bonn.
