= Rokitki, Bytów County =

Rokitki
- Village
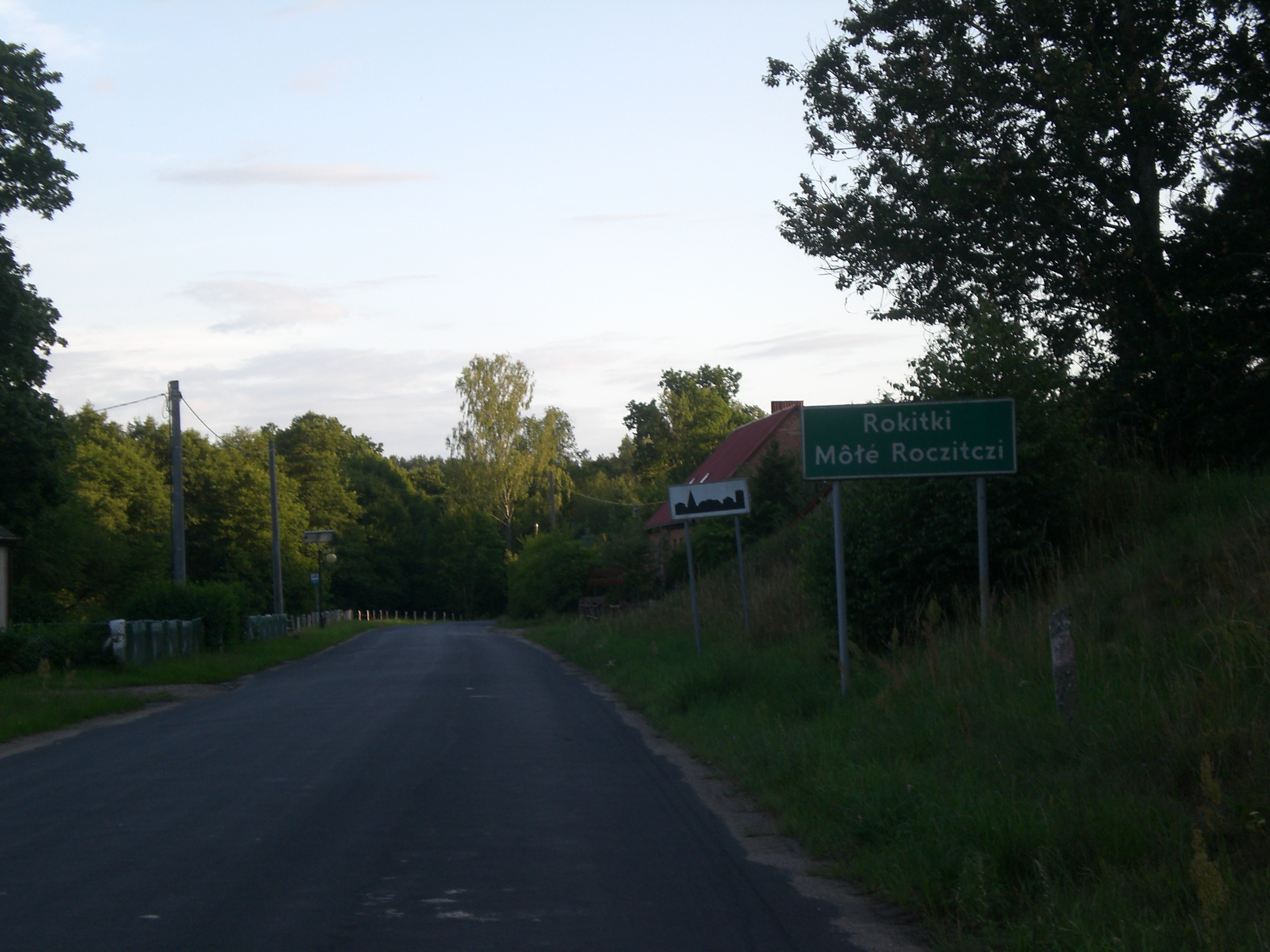

- Location within Poland
- Coordinates: 54°21′23″N 17°40′40″E
- Country: Poland
- Voivodeship: Pomeranian
- County: Bytów
- Gmina: Czarna Dąbrówka
- Population: 112

Rokitki [rɔˈkitki] (German: Klein Rakitt) is a village in the administrative district of Gmina Czarna Dąbrówka, within Bytów County, Pomeranian Voivodeship, in northern Poland.
