= Żbiki-Antosy =

- Village
- Location within Poland
- Coordinates: 52°56′25″N 20°54′12″E
- Country: Poland
- Voivodeship: Masovian
- County: Przasnysz
- Gmina: Krasne

Żbiki-Antosy [ˈʐbiki anˈtɔsɨ] is a village in the administrative district of Gmina Krasne, within Przasnysz County, Masovian Voivodeship, in east-central Poland.
