= Nowe Karwno =

- Settlement
- Location within Poland
- Coordinates: 54°24′43″N 17°31′57″E
- Country: Poland
- Voivodeship: Pomeranian
- County: Bytów
- Gmina: Czarna Dąbrówka

Nowe Karwno [ˈnɔvɛ ˈkarvnɔ] is a settlement in the administrative district of Gmina Czarna Dąbrówka, within Bytów County, Pomeranian Voivodeship, in northern Poland.
