= Szlasy-Leszcze =

- Village
- Location within Poland
- Coordinates: 52°56′34″N 20°50′42″E
- Country: Poland
- Voivodeship: Masovian
- County: Przasnysz
- Gmina: Krasne

Szlasy-Leszcze [ˈʂlasɨ ˈlɛʂt͡ʂɛ] is a village in the administrative district of Gmina Krasne, within Przasnysz County, Masovian Voivodeship, in east-central Poland.
