= Zielonki, Masovian Voivodeship =

Zielonki
- Village
- Location within Poland
- Coordinates: 52°52′49″N 20°56′0″E
- Country: Poland
- Voivodeship: Masovian
- County: Przasnysz
- Gmina: Krasne

Zielonki [ʑɛˈlɔŋki] is a village in the administrative district of Gmina Krasne, within Przasnysz County, Masovian Voivodeship, in east-central Poland.
