= Kartkowo, Pomeranian Voivodeship =

Kartkowo
- Village
- Location within Poland
- Coordinates: 54°16′26″N 17°28′25″E
- Country: Poland
- Voivodeship: Pomeranian
- County: Bytów
- Gmina: Czarna Dąbrówka
- Population: 52

Kartkowo [kartˈkɔvɔ] is a village in the administrative district of Gmina Czarna Dąbrówka, within Bytów County, Pomeranian Voivodeship, in northern Poland.
