= Gustawin =

- Village
- Location within Poland
- Coordinates: 52°58′11″N 20°48′30″E
- Country: Poland
- Voivodeship: Masovian
- County: Przasnysz
- Gmina: Krasne
- Population: 20

Gustawin [ɡusˈtavin] is a village in the administrative district of Gmina Krasne, within Przasnysz County, Masovian Voivodeship, in east-central Poland.
