= Augustów, Przasnysz County =

Augustów
- Village
- Location within Poland
- Coordinates: 52°56′19″N 20°57′16″E
- Country: Poland
- Voivodeship: Masovian
- County: Przasnysz
- Gmina: Krasne

Augustów [auˈɡustuf] is a village in the administrative district of Gmina Krasne, within Przasnysz County, Masovian Voivodeship, in east-central Poland.
