= Święchowo =

- Settlement
- Location within Poland
- Coordinates: 54°22′25″N 17°28′0″E
- Country: Poland
- Voivodeship: Pomeranian
- County: Bytów
- Gmina: Czarna Dąbrówka
- Population: 20

Święchowo (Polish: [ɕfjɛ̃ˈxɔvɔ]) is a settlement in the administrative district of Gmina Czarna Dąbrówka, within Bytów County, Pomeranian Voivodeship, in northern Poland.
