= Milewo-Brzegędy =

- Village
- Location within Poland
- Coordinates: 52°52′11″N 20°53′05″E
- Country: Poland
- Voivodeship: Masovian
- County: Przasnysz
- Gmina: Krasne

Milewo-Brzegędy [miˈlɛvɔ bʐɛˈɡɛndɨ] is a village in the administrative district of Gmina Krasne, within Przasnysz County, Masovian Voivodeship, in east-central Poland.
