= Milewo-Kulki =

- Village
- Location within Poland
- Coordinates: 52°54′26″N 20°51′57″E
- Country: Poland
- Voivodeship: Masovian
- County: Przasnysz
- Gmina: Krasne

Milewo-Kulki [miˈlɛvɔ ˈkulki] is a village in the administrative district of Gmina Krasne, within Przasnysz County, Masovian Voivodeship, in east-central Poland.
