= Kozina (surname) =

Kozina is a Slavic surname that may refer to:

- Jan Sladký Kozina (1652–1695), Czech revolutionary leader
- Krešimir Kozina (born 1990), Croatian handball player
- Marjan Kozina (1907–1966), Slovene composer
- Tony Kozina (born 1970), American professional wrestler
- Andrej Kozina (born 1997), Croatian professional writer, philosopher & filmmaker

== See also ==
- Kozin (surname)
