= Iłówko =

Village in Gmina Krasne, Poland

- Village
- Location within Poland
- Coordinates: 52°53′17″N 20°57′13″E
- Country: Poland
- Voivodeship: Masovian
- County: Przasnysz
- Gmina: Krasne

Iłówko [iˈwufkɔ] is a village in the administrative district of Gmina Krasne, within Przasnysz County, Masovian Voivodeship, in east-central Poland.
