= Rudka, Pomeranian Voivodeship =

Rudka
- Settlement
- Location within Poland
- Coordinates: 54°19′10″N 17°41′53″E
- Country: Poland
- Voivodeship: Pomeranian
- County: Bytów
- Gmina: Czarna Dąbrówka

Rudka [ˈrutka] is a settlement in the administrative district of Gmina Czarna Dąbrówka, within Bytów County, Pomeranian Voivodeship, in northern Poland.
