= Pęczki-Kozłowo =

- Village
- Location within Poland
- Coordinates: 52°57′05″N 20°48′22″E
- Country: Poland
- Voivodeship: Masovian
- County: Przasnysz
- Gmina: Krasne

Pęczki-Kozłowo [ˈpɛnt͡ʂki kɔˈzwɔvɔ] is a village in the administrative district of Gmina Krasne, within Przasnysz County, Masovian Voivodeship, in east-central Poland.
