= Milewo-Gawary =

- Village
- Location within Poland
- Coordinates: 52°53′N 20°52′E
- Country: Poland
- Voivodeship: Masovian
- County: Przasnysz
- Gmina: Krasne
- Elevation: 118.7 m (389 ft)
- Population: 8

Milewo-Gawary [miˈlɛvɔ ɡaˈvarɨ] is a village in the administrative district of Gmina Krasne, within Przasnysz County, Masovian Voivodeship, in east-central Poland.
