= Kurowo, Przasnysz County =

Kurowo
- Village
- Location within Poland
- Coordinates: 52°54′10″N 20°54′47″E
- Country: Poland
- Voivodeship: Masovian
- County: Przasnysz
- Gmina: Krasne

Kurowo [kuˈrɔvɔ] is a village in the administrative district of Gmina Krasne, within Przasnysz County, Masovian Voivodeship, in east-central Poland.
