= Łupawa (river) =

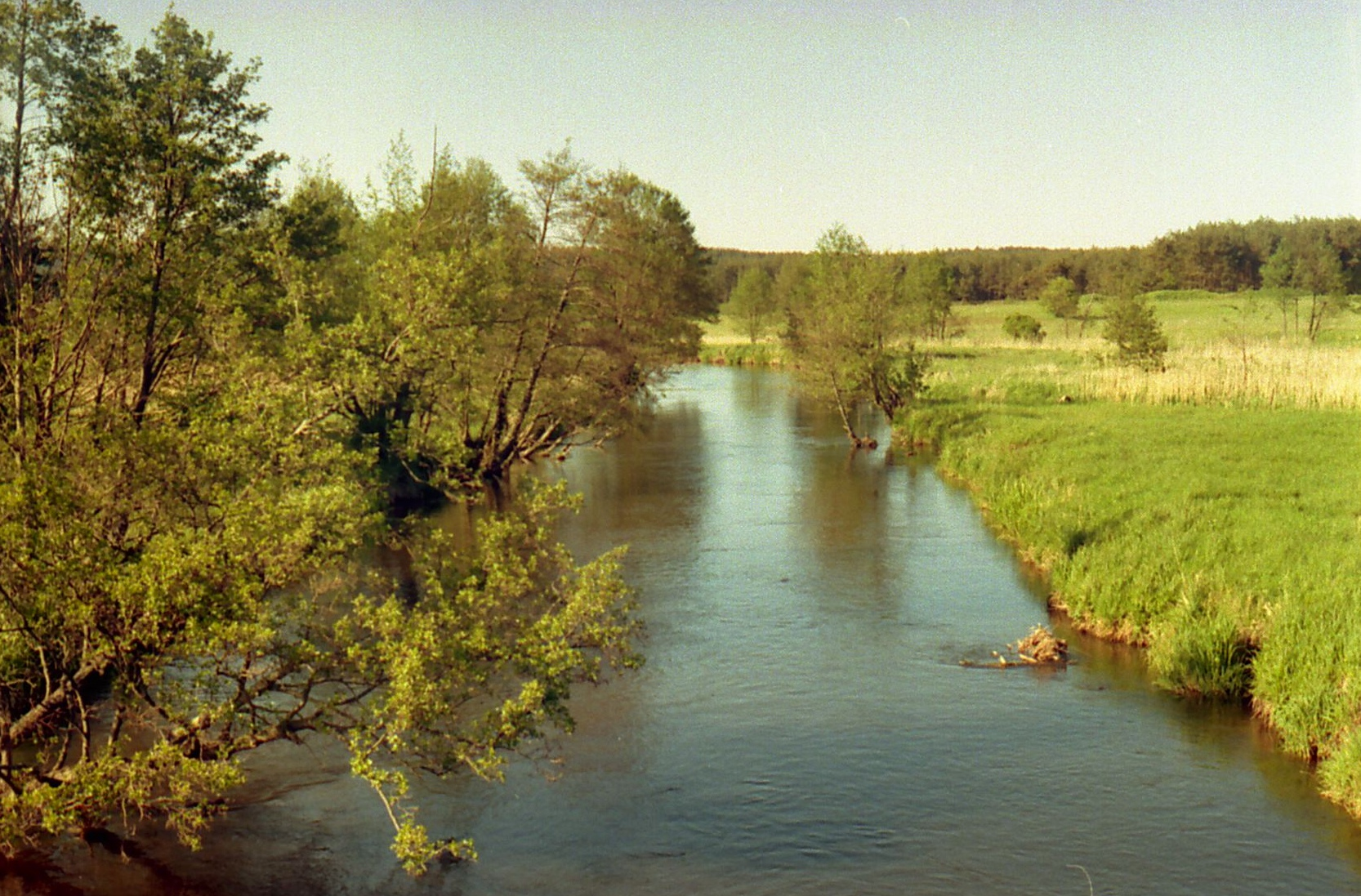

Location
- Country: Poland
- Voivodeship: Pomeranian

Physical characteristics
- Source: Lake Jasień
  - location: Zawiaty, Bytów County
  - coordinates: 54°19′55″N 17°37′11″E
  - elevation: 256 m (840 ft)
- Mouth: Baltic Sea
  - location: Rowy, Słupsk County
  - coordinates: 54°40′09″N 17°02′58″E
- Length: 98.7 km (61.3 mi)
- Basin size: 924.5 km^{2} (357.0 mi^{2})

Basin features
- Tributaries
  - left: Charstnica
  - right: Bukowina; Darżyńska Struga
- Waterbodies: Lake Gardno

Łupawa (German: Lupow) is a river of Poland. It terminates in the Baltic Sea near Rowy.
