= Dąbie, Gmina Czarna Dąbrówka =

Dąbie
- Village
- Location within Poland
- Coordinates: 54°21′9″N 17°38′47″E
- Country: Poland
- Voivodeship: Pomeranian
- County: Bytów
- Gmina: Czarna Dąbrówka
- Population: 61

Dąbie [ˈdɔmbjɛ] is a village in the administrative district of Gmina Czarna Dąbrówka, within Bytów County, Pomeranian Voivodeship, in northern Poland.
