= Karwno =

- Village
- Location within Poland
- Coordinates: 54°23′37″N 17°31′23″E
- Country: Poland
- Voivodeship: Pomeranian
- County: Bytów
- Gmina: Czarna Dąbrówka
- Population: 270

Karwno [ˈkarvnɔ] (German: Karwen) is a village in the administrative district of Gmina Czarna Dąbrówka, within Bytów County, Pomeranian Voivodeship, in northern Poland.
