= Drążkowo =

- Settlement
- Location within Poland
- Coordinates: 54°25′0″N 17°32′44″E
- Country: Poland
- Voivodeship: Pomeranian
- County: Bytów
- Gmina: Czarna Dąbrówka

Drążkowo [drɔ̃ʂˈkɔvɔ] is a settlement in the administrative district of Gmina Czarna Dąbrówka, within Bytów County, Pomeranian Voivodeship, in northern Poland.
