= Soszyce, Pomeranian Voivodeship =

Soszyce
- Village
- Location within Poland
- Coordinates: 54°24′25″N 17°29′38″E
- Country: Poland
- Voivodeship: Pomeranian
- County: Bytów
- Gmina: Czarna Dąbrówka
- Population: 20

Soszyce [sɔˈʂɨt͡sɛ] is a village in the administrative district of Gmina Czarna Dąbrówka, within Bytów County, Pomeranian Voivodeship, in northern Poland.
