= Nożynko =

- Village
- Location within Poland
- Coordinates: 54°18′38″N 17°27′21″E
- Country: Poland
- Voivodeship: Pomeranian
- County: Bytów
- Gmina: Czarna Dąbrówka
- Population: 160

Nożynko [nɔˈʐɨŋkɔ] (German: Klein Nossin) is a village in the administrative district of Gmina Czarna Dąbrówka, within Bytów County, Pomeranian Voivodeship, in northern Poland.
