= Grabówko, Masovian Voivodeship =

Grabówko
- Village
- Location within Poland
- Coordinates: 52°54′13″N 20°51′18″E
- Country: Poland
- Voivodeship: Masovian
- County: Przasnysz
- Gmina: Krasne

Grabówko [ɡraˈbufkɔ] is a village in the administrative district of Gmina Krasne, within Przasnysz County, Masovian Voivodeship, in east-central Poland.
