= Dąbrowa Leśna, Pomeranian Voivodeship =

Dąbrowa Leśna
- Settlement
- Location within Poland
- Coordinates: 54°17′33″N 17°34′45″E
- Country: Poland
- Voivodeship: Pomeranian
- County: Bytów
- Gmina: Czarna Dąbrówka

Dąbrowa Leśna [dɔmˈbrɔva ˈlɛɕna] (Kashubian: Lesnô Dąbrowa) is a settlement in the administrative district of Gmina Czarna Dąbrówka, within Bytów County, Pomeranian Voivodeship, in northern Poland.
