= Gustav Bogislav von Münchow =

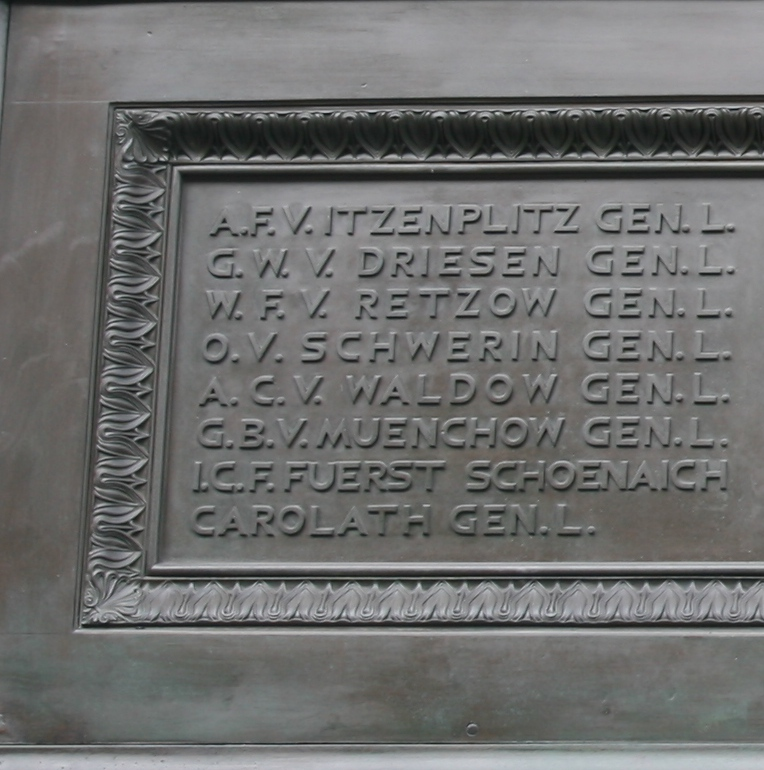
- Münchow's entry on the Equestrian statue of Frederick the Great
- Born: 10 September 1686; Kosemühl, Pomerania
- Died: 20 June 1766 (aged 79); Berlin
- Burial place: Garrison Church, Potsdam
- Spouse(s): Antoinette Philippine von Borstell; Sophie Elenore von Schwerin
- Military career
- Allegiance: Prussia
- Branch: Prussian Army
- Service years: 1701–1766
- Rank: Major General
- Conflicts: War of the Spanish Succession; Great Northern War; War of the Austrian Succession; First Silesian War; Second Silesian War; Seven Years' War
- Awards: Black Eagle Order; Equestrian statue of Frederick the Great; Knight, Commander, and Chancellor, Order of Saint John

Gustav Bogislav von Münchow (10 September 1686 – 20 June 1766) was a Prussian general. In the early years of the reign of Frederick the Great, Münchow was not only a soldier and a diplomatic confidant, but he also earned a reputation for the improvement of Prussian military medical care. He was honored with the Black Eagle Order and his name is listed on the Equestrian statue of Frederick the Great.

== Family ==
Gustav von Münchow was born on 10 September 1686 in Kosemühl, Pomerania. He was the son of Bernhard Christian von Münchow and Clara Erdmuthe Wobeser. The father was a master of Kosemühl, a royal Brandenburg cornet at a young age, and when Crown Prince Frederick was imprisoned between 1732–1733, he was chamber president in Küstrin. A long-term friendship existed between Bernhard and both Frederick I and his son and successor, Frederick William.

== Military career ==
In 1701, Gustav von Münchow entered as a junior cadet in the Hessian-Kassel regiment of prince Frederick, who was the son-in-law of his father's friend and benefactor, Frederick William I. The following year, the prince appointed Münchow as his Valet de chambre.

In 1703, Münchow changed to the Prussian infantry regiment of the Prince of Hesse. With his promotion to the second lieutenant in 1707, he entered the regiment Markgraf Albrecht. During the Spanish War of Succession, he fought in the Prussian contingent on the imperial side in the battles of Malplaquet and Ramillies. Appointed staff captain in 1710, he participated in the Great Northern War at the Siege Stralsund. In September 1715 he became a captain with field command, and became a major in October 1717. In 1724, he commanded the Regiment Kalckstein. In May 1735 King Frederick William I promoted Münchow to colonel.

=== Service to Frederick the Great ===
Frederick's father and grandfather had had a close friendship with Bernhard von Münchow, and Frederick II had been included with Bernhard's family. Shortly after his accession to the throne, on 1 June 1740 Frederick gave Münchow the position of the proprietor of the newly established regiment, subsequently called Regiment Münchow. On 7 June 1740 Frederick sent Colonel Münchow on a diplomatic mission to Vienna informing the Austrians of his ascension.

In the course of the First Silesian War, in May 1741, Münchow took over the supervision of the Prussian hospitals set up in the neutral Wrocław after the Battle of Mollwitz. Until then, Prussian military medicine had been in a neglected and chaotic state. Münchow's most important improvement was the separate treatment and care of the sick from wounded, which greatly reduced the danger of cross infection. For his success, in July 1742, Frederick awarded Münchow the Order Pour le Mérite and appointed him in September 1742 to major general.

During the Second Silesian War, Münchow participated in the Siege of Prague in September 1744 and the Siege of Cosel and in the Battle of Hohenfriedberg. There, on the left wing of the first meeting with the regiments Borcke, Blankensee and Bevern, he held the position until the attack of the Bayreuth Dragoons decided the battle in favor of Prussia. On 15 July 1745 Frederick promoted him as lieutenant-general. For his actions in the Battle of Kesselsdorf, the King awarded him the Black Eagle Order in December 1745. In August 1747 he became governor of Spandau.

At the beginning of the Seven Years' War, Frederick II appointed him as interim commander of the fortress of Glogau in August 1756. Münchow carried out the function until January 1758.

== Powers and honors ==
On 20 April 1720, he became knight of the Order of Saint John, and commander on 7 April 1728. Frederick II, in the first year of his reign in October 1740, endowed Münchow with a place as a canon at the cathedral at Magdeburg, and he later became Chancellor of the Order. In 1752, Münchow received an appointment to the cathedral in the Abbey of Saint Sebastian in Magdeburg. In addition to the names of other contemporaries who had been associated with the king, Münchow is also listed on the Equestrian statue of Frederick the Great.

Gustav von Münchow was married twice. With his first wife, Antoinette Philippine von Borstell (20 February 1701–5 September 1730 in Berlin), he had a son and two daughters. The daughter, Antoinette Katharina (born 24 August 1730), married Ludwig Clamor de la Chevallerie, the son of General Ernst August de la Chevallerie von la Motte. His married second wife, Sophie Elenore von Schwerin, on 14 June 1732 (13 April 1706 in Rehberg–16 July 1769 in Berlin), in the Berlin garrison church. She was the sister of General Philipp Bogislav von Schwerin. This marriage remained without children.

Münchow died in Berlin in 1766 and was buried in the Garrison Church.

== Literature ==
- König, Anton Balthasar, Biographisches Lexikon aller Helden und Militairpersonen. Band III, Berlin, 1796, pp. 77–79.
- Mebes, Julius. Beiträge zur Geschichte des Brandenburgisch-Preussischen Staates, Band 1, S. 397 Digital version. Accessed 11 January 2017
- Priesdorff, Kurt von, Soldatisches Führertum. Teil 2. Die preußischen Generale vom Regierungsantritt Friedrichs des Großen bis 1763 [Band 1], Hanseatische Verlagsanstalt, Hamburg o.J. (1937), S. 258f. (Nr. 301)
