= Żbiki-Gawronki =

- Village
- Location within Poland
- Coordinates: 52°56′N 20°54′E
- Country: Poland
- Voivodeship: Masovian
- County: Przasnysz
- Gmina: Krasne

Żbiki-Gawronki [ˈʐbiki ɡaˈvrɔŋki] is a village in the administrative district of Gmina Krasne, within Przasnysz County, Masovian Voivodeship, in east-central Poland.
