= Jaźwiny, Przasnysz County =

Jaźwiny
- Village
- Location within Poland
- Coordinates: 52°57′23″N 20°49′7″E
- Country: Poland
- Voivodeship: Masovian
- County: Przasnysz
- Gmina: Krasne

Jaźwiny [jaʑˈvinɨ] is a village in the administrative district of Gmina Krasne, within Przasnysz County, Masovian Voivodeship, in east-central Poland.
