= Bochowo =

- Village
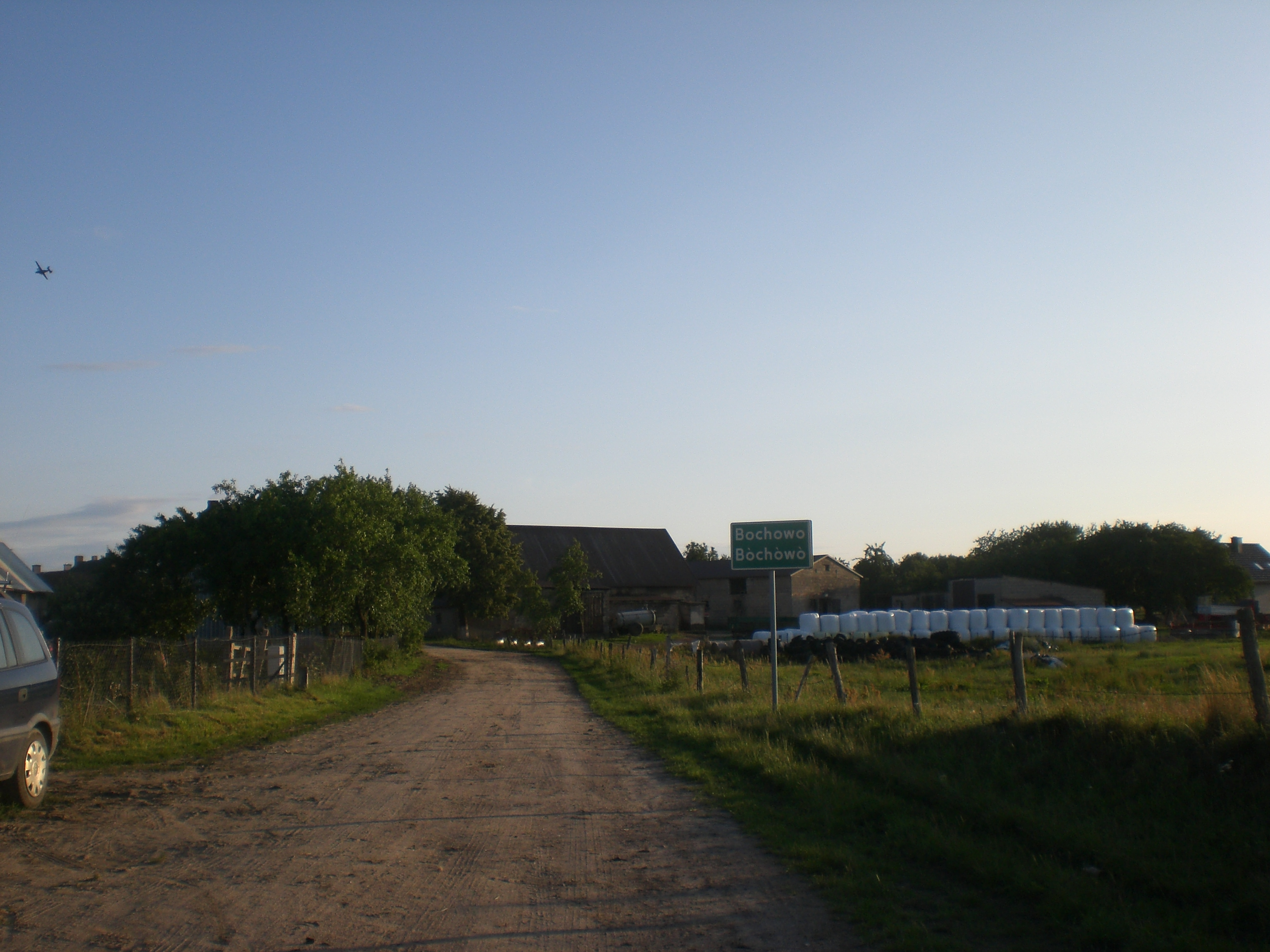

- Location within Poland
- Coordinates: 54°21′42″N 17°43′21″E
- Country: Poland
- Voivodeship: Pomeranian
- County: Bytów
- Gmina: Czarna Dąbrówka
- Population: 132

Bochowo [bɔˈxɔvɔ] is a village in the administrative district of Gmina Czarna Dąbrówka, within Bytów County, Pomeranian Voivodeship, in northern Poland.
