= Krasne-Elżbiecin =

- Village
- Location within Poland
- Coordinates: 52°54′07″N 21°00′28″E
- Country: Poland
- Voivodeship: Masovian
- County: Przasnysz
- Gmina: Krasne

Krasne-Elżbiecin [ˈkrasnɛ ɛlʐˈbjɛt͡ɕin] is a village in the administrative district of Gmina Krasne, within Przasnysz County, Masovian Voivodeship, in east-central Poland.
