= Bartołdy =

- Village
- Location within Poland
- Coordinates: 52°58′N 20°51′E
- Country: Poland
- Voivodeship: Masovian
- County: Przasnysz
- Gmina: Krasne

Bartołdy [barˈtɔu̯dɨ] is a village in the administrative district of Gmina Krasne, within Przasnysz County, Masovian Voivodeship, in east-central Poland.
