= Dąbki, Masovian Voivodeship =

Dąbki
- Village
- Location within Poland
- Coordinates: 52°53′00″N 20°51′44″E
- Country: Poland
- Voivodeship: Masovian
- County: Przasnysz
- Gmina: Krasne

Dąbki [ˈdɔmpki] is a village in the administrative district of Gmina Krasne, within Przasnysz County, Masovian Voivodeship, in east-central Poland.
