= Milewo-Szwejki =

- Village
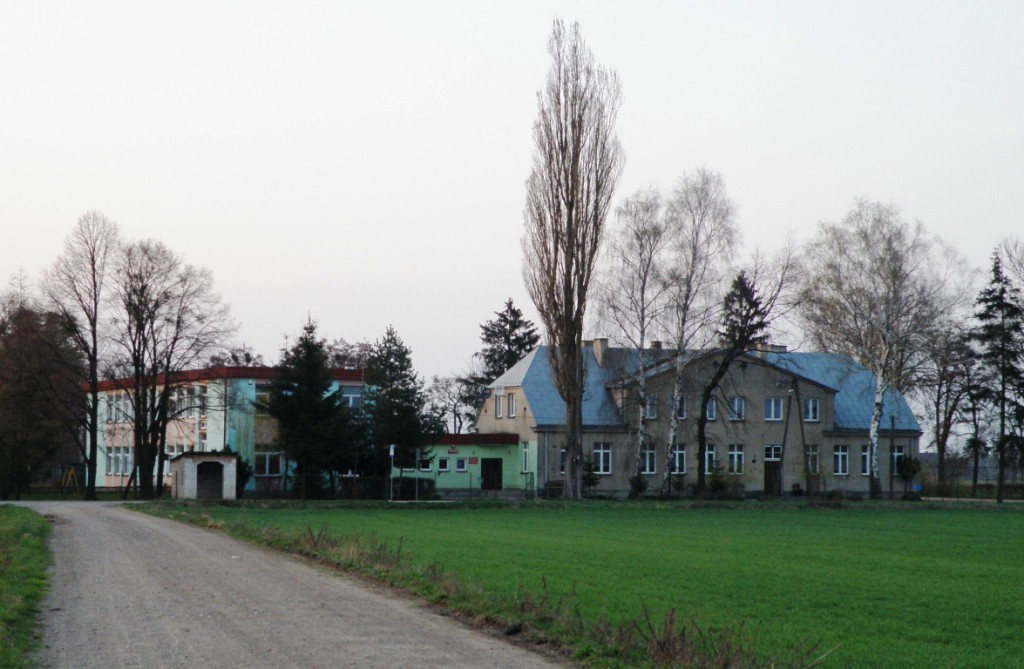
- Elementary school in Milewo-Szwejki

- Location within Poland
- Coordinates: 52°53′42″N 20°53′51″E
- Country: Poland
- Voivodeship: Masovian
- County: Przasnysz
- Gmina: Krasne

Milewo-Szwejki [miˈlɛvɔ ˈʂfɛi̯ki] is a village in the administrative district of Gmina Krasne, within Przasnysz County, Masovian Voivodeship, in east-central Poland.
