= Wargowo, Pomeranian Voivodeship =

Wargowo
- Village
- Location within Poland
- Coordinates: 54°25′34″N 17°31′43″E
- Country: Poland
- Voivodeship: Pomeranian
- County: Bytów
- Gmina: Czarna Dąbrówka
- Population: 90

Wargowo [varˈɡɔvɔ] (German: Vargow) is a village in the administrative district of Gmina Czarna Dąbrówka, within Bytów County, Pomeranian Voivodeship, in northern Poland.
