= Karl Wilhelm Krüger =

German classical philologist

Karl Wilhelm Krüger (28 September 1796 – 1 May 1874) was a German Hellenist.

== Biography ==
He was born at Gross-Nossin in Pomerania, and educated at Halle (1816–20). From 1820 to 1838 he taught at Zerbst, Bernburg, and Berlin where he worked at the Joachimsthal Gymnasium under the directorship of August Meineke. Afterwards he worked as a private scholar in Nauen, Neuruppin, Heidelberg and Weinheim, where he died in 1874 of a stroke.

== Works ==
- Griechische Sprachlehre für Schulen (“Greek language instruction for schools”, 1842–56; 6th ed. 1892)
- Historisch-philologische Studien (“Historical-philological studies", 1836–51)
- Kritische Analekten (“Selected criticism”, 1863–74)

He also published editions of Xenophon, Thucydides, Herodotus, and Arrian. His writings on Greek syntax were later edited, translated into English and published with the titles "Attic Greek prose syntax" (1997–98) and "Greek syntax : early Greek poetic and Herodotean syntax" (2002-03).
