= Gmina Czarna Dąbrówka =

Gmina Czarna Dąbrówka Czarna Dąbrówka Commune
- Gmina
- Coat of arms
- Interactive map of Gmina Czarna Dąbrówka
- Coordinates (Czarna Dąbrówka): 54°21′17″N 17°33′53″E
- Country: Poland
- Voivodeship: Pomeranian
- County: Bytów
- Seat: Czarna Dąbrówka

Area
  - Total: 298.28 km^{2} (115.17 sq mi)

Population (2006)
  - Total: 5,626
  - Density: 18.86/km^{2} (48.85/sq mi)
- Website: http://www.czarnadabrowka.pl/

Gmina Czarna Dąbrówka (Kashubian: Czôrnô Dãbrówka) is a rural gmina (administrative district) in Bytów County, Pomeranian Voivodeship, in northern Poland. Its seat is the village of Czarna Dąbrówka, which lies approximately 25 kilometres (16 mi) north of Bytów and 70 km (43 mi) west of the regional capital Gdańsk.

The gmina covers an area of 298.28 square kilometres (115.2 sq mi), and as of 2006 its total population is 5,626.

The gmina contains part of the protected area called Słupia Valley Landscape Park.

== Villages ==
Gmina Czarna Dąbrówka contains the villages and settlements of Będzieszyn, Bochówko, Bochowo, Brzezinka, Ceromin, Cole, Czarna Dąbrówka, Czarnolesie, Dąbie, Dąbrowa Leśna, Dęby, Drążkowo, Flisów, Gliśnica, Jasień, Jaszewo, Jerzkowice, Kartkowo, Karwno, Kleszczyniec, Kłosy, Kostroga, Kotuszewo, Kozin, Kozy, Lipieniec, Łupawsko, Mikorowo, Mydlita, Nowe Karwno, Nożynko, Nożyno, Obrowo, Osowskie, Otnoga, Owsianka, Podkomorki, Podkomorzyce, Połupino, Przybin, Przylaski, Rokiciny, Rokicki Dwór, Rokitki, Rokity, Rudka, Skotawsko, Soszyce, Święchowo, Unichowo, Wargówko, Wargowo and Zawiaty.

== Neighbouring gminas ==
Gmina Czarna Dąbrówka is bordered by the gminas of Borzytuchom, Bytów, Cewice, Dębnica Kaszubska, Parchowo, Potęgowo and Sierakowice.
