= Brzezinka, Bytów County =

Brzezinka
- Settlement
- Location within Poland
- Coordinates: 54°17′49″N 17°33′52″E
- Country: Poland
- Voivodeship: Pomeranian
- County: Bytów
- Gmina: Czarna Dąbrówka

Brzezinka (Polish: [bʐɛˈʑiŋka]) is a settlement in the administrative district of Gmina Czarna Dąbrówka, within Bytów County, Pomeranian Voivodeship, in northern Poland.
