= Owsianka, Pomeranian Voivodeship =

Owsianka
- Settlement
- Location within Poland
- Coordinates: 54°25′0″N 17°38′21″E
- Country: Poland
- Voivodeship: Pomeranian
- County: Bytów
- Gmina: Czarna Dąbrówka

Owsianka [ɔfˈɕaŋka] is a settlement in the administrative district of Gmina Czarna Dąbrówka, within Bytów County, Pomeranian Voivodeship, in northern Poland.
