= Godacze, Przasnysz County =

Godacze
- Village
- Location within Poland
- Coordinates: 52°53′55″N 20°56′54″E
- Country: Poland
- Voivodeship: Masovian
- County: Przasnysz
- Gmina: Krasne

Godacze [ɡɔˈdat͡ʂɛ] is a village in the administrative district of Gmina Krasne, within Przasnysz County, Masovian Voivodeship, in east-central Poland.
