= Nowa Wieś, Przasnysz County =

Nowa Wieś
- Village
- Location within Poland
- Coordinates: 52°54′29″N 20°53′37″E
- Country: Poland
- Voivodeship: Masovian
- County: Przasnysz
- Gmina: Krasne

Nowa Wieś [ˈnɔva ˈvjɛɕ] is a village in the administrative district of Gmina Krasne, within Przasnysz County, Masovian Voivodeship, in east-central Poland.
