= Kamienice-Ślesice =

- Village
- Location within Poland
- Coordinates: 52°56′33″N 20°49′7″E
- Country: Poland
- Voivodeship: Masovian
- County: Przasnysz
- Gmina: Krasne

Kamienice-Ślesice [kamjɛˈnit͡sɛ ɕlɛˈɕit͡sɛ] is a village in the administrative district of Gmina Krasne, within Przasnysz County, Masovian Voivodeship, in east-central Poland.
