= Barańce, Masovian Voivodeship =

Barańce
- Village
- Location within Poland
- Coordinates: 52°57′N 20°48′E
- Country: Poland
- Voivodeship: Masovian
- County: Przasnysz
- Gmina: Krasne

Barańce [baˈraɲt͡sɛ] is a village in the administrative district of Gmina Krasne, within Przasnysz County, Masovian Voivodeship, in east-central Poland.
