= Nożyno =

- Village
- Location within Poland
- Coordinates: 54°18′53″N 17°29′25″E
- Country: Poland
- Voivodeship: Pomeranian
- County: Bytów
- Gmina: Czarna Dąbrówka
- Population: 312

Nożyno [nɔˈʐɨnɔ] (German: Groß Nossin) is a village in the administrative district of Gmina Czarna Dąbrówka, within Bytów County, Pomeranian Voivodeship, in northern Poland.

== Notable residents ==
- Karl Wilhelm Krüger (1796–1874), German Hellenist
