= Szlasy-Umiemy =

- Village
- Location within Poland
- Coordinates: 52°55′56″N 20°50′29″E
- Country: Poland
- Voivodeship: Masovian
- County: Przasnysz
- Gmina: Krasne

Szlasy-Umiemy [ˈʂlasɨ uˈmjɛmɨ] is a village in the administrative district of Gmina Krasne, within Przasnysz County, Masovian Voivodeship, in east-central Poland.
