= Cole, Pomeranian Voivodeship =

Orle
- Settlement
- Location within Poland
- Coordinates: 54°17′27″N 17°36′29″E
- Country: Poland
- Voivodeship: Pomeranian
- County: Bytów
- Gmina: Czarna Dąbrówka
- Population: 61

Orle (Dombrowe -1929, Cole) [ˈt͡sɔlɛ] is a settlement in the administrative district of Gmina Czarna Dąbrówka, within Bytów County, Pomeranian Voivodeship, in northern Poland.
