= Jasień, Pomeranian Voivodeship =

Jasień
- Village
- Location within Poland
- Coordinates: 54°17′9″N 17°37′43″E
- Country: Poland
- Voivodeship: Pomeranian
- County: Bytów
- Gmina: Czarna Dąbrówka
- Population: 402

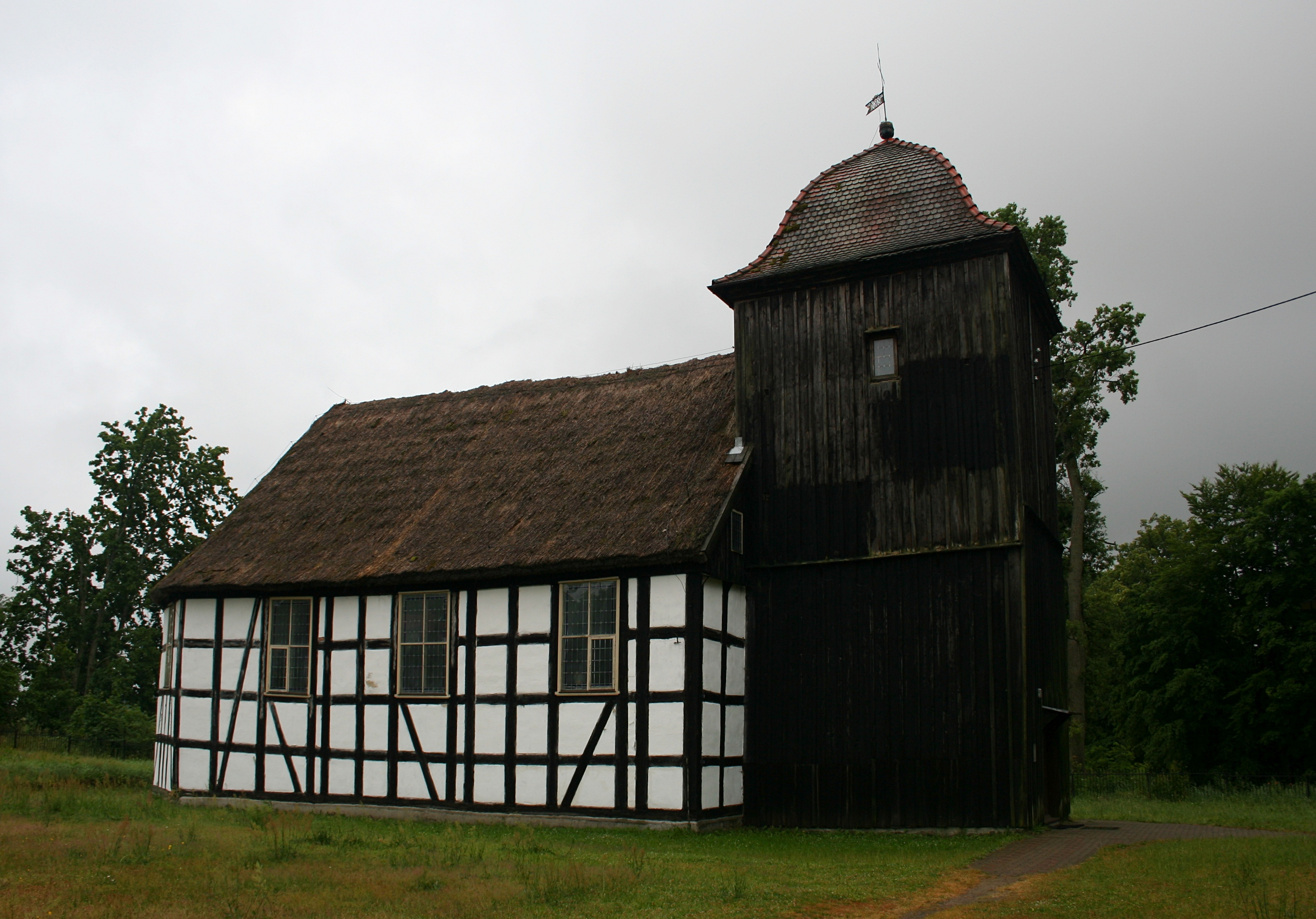
Church

Jasień [ˈjaɕɛɲ] (German: Jassen) is a village in the administrative district of Gmina Czarna Dąbrówka, within Bytów County, Pomeranian Voivodeship, in northern Poland.
