= Kozin, Warmian-Masurian Voivodeship =

Kozin
- Village
- Location within Poland
- Coordinates: 53°56′48″N 21°43′12″E
- Country: Poland
- Voivodeship: Warmian-Masurian
- County: Giżycko
- Gmina: Giżycko
- Founded: 1550s
- Time zone: UTC+1 (CET)
  - Summer (DST): UTC+2 (CEST)
- Vehicle registration: NGI

Kozin [ˈkɔʑin] is a village in the administrative district of Gmina Giżycko, within Giżycko County, Warmian-Masurian Voivodeship, in north-eastern Poland. It is located on the northwestern shore of Jagodne Lake in the region of Masuria.

== History ==
The origins of the village date back to circa 1555, when Trojan Kałka and Maciej Danowski bought land to establish a village. For centuries, it remained an ethnically Polish village, and as of 1625, it had an exclusively Polish population. The village historically had two equivalent Polish names, Kozin and Kozinowa. Under Germany, in 1926, the village was renamed Rodenau to erase traces of Polish origin. Following World War II, in 1945, it became again part of Poland, and its historic Polish name Kozin was restored.
