= Obrowo, Gmina Czarna Dąbrówka =

Obrowo
- Village
- Location within Poland
- Coordinates: 54°15′46″N 17°35′54″E
- Country: Poland
- Voivodeship: Pomeranian
- County: Bytów
- Gmina: Czarna Dąbrówka

Obrowo [ɔˈbrɔvɔ] is a village in the administrative district of Gmina Czarna Dąbrówka, within Bytów County, Pomeranian Voivodeship, in northern Poland.
