= Tadeusz Żbikowski =

Polish Sinologist and translator

Tadeusz Żbikowski (29 March 1930 in Warsaw – 11 November 1989 in Warsaw) was a Polish Sinologist, professor of Warsaw University, and translator of Chinese literature.

== Works ==
- Religie Chin (Religions of China) (with Olgierd Wojtasiewicz)
- Religie Archipelagu Malajskiego (Religions of Malay Archipelago)
- Religie Australii i Oceanii (Religions of Australia and Oceania)
- Legendy i pradzieje Kraju Środka (Legends and histories of Country of the Center)
- Konfucjusz (Confucius)

== Translations ==
- Cheng'en, Wu (1984). Journey to the West (in Polish). Czytelnik. ISBN 83-07-00633-3.
- Shou, Chen (1972). Records of Three Kingdoms (in Polish). Czytelnik.
- Księga powinności synowskiej
- Jang Czu
