= Będzieszyn, Bytów County =

Będzieszyn
- Settlement
- Location within Poland
- Coordinates: 54°17′46″N 17°39′19″E
- Country: Poland
- Voivodeship: Pomeranian
- County: Bytów
- Gmina: Czarna Dąbrówka

Będzieszyn [bɛnˈd͡ʑɛʂɨn] is a settlement in the administrative district of Gmina Czarna Dąbrówka, within Bytów County, Pomeranian Voivodeship, in northern Poland.
