= Kostroga =

- Settlement
- Location within Poland
- Coordinates: 54°22′25″N 17°38′58″E
- Country: Poland
- Voivodeship: Pomeranian
- County: Bytów
- Gmina: Czarna Dąbrówka

Kostroga [kɔsˈtrɔɡa] is a settlement in the administrative district of Gmina Czarna Dąbrówka, within Bytów County, Pomeranian Voivodeship, in northern Poland.
