= Otnoga =

- Village
- Location within Poland
- Coordinates: 54°20′24″N 17°37′42″E
- Country: Poland
- Voivodeship: Pomeranian
- County: Bytów
- Gmina: Czarna Dąbrówka

Otnoga [ɔtˈnɔɡa] (German: Wottnogge; 1937–1945: Mühlental) is a village in the administrative district of Gmina Czarna Dąbrówka, within Bytów County, Pomeranian Voivodeship, in northern Poland.
