= Kozin (surname) =

Kozin (Russian: Козин, from коза meaning female goat) is a Russian masculine surname. Its Russian feminine counterpart is Kozina, while in other Slavic countries Kozina is also a masculine surname. It may refer to:

- Alexey Kozin (1976-1999), Russian military officer killed in War of Dagestan and posthumous Hero of the Russian Federation
- Nestor Kozin (1902-1992), Red Army Major general and Hero of the Soviet Union
- Vadim Kozin (1903–1994), Russian tenor singer
- Valentin Kozin (born 1940), Soviet hockey player
- Viktor Kozin (born 1953), a Russian naval engineer
- Yury Kozin (born 1948), Russian weightlifter

== See also ==
- Kozina (surname)
- Kozhin
