= Kurówko, Przasnysz County =

Kurówko
- Village
- Location within Poland
- Coordinates: 52°54′14″N 20°55′30″E
- Country: Poland
- Voivodeship: Masovian
- County: Przasnysz
- Gmina: Krasne

Kurówko [kuˈrufkɔ] is a village in the administrative district of Gmina Krasne, within Przasnysz County, Masovian Voivodeship, in east-central Poland.
