= Kozin, Pomeranian Voivodeship =

Kozin
- Village
- Location within Poland
- Coordinates: 54°22′41″N 17°37′35″E
- Country: Poland
- Voivodeship: Pomeranian
- County: Bytów
- Gmina: Czarna Dąbrówka
- Population: 60

Kozin [ˈkɔʑin] is a village in the administrative district of Gmina Czarna Dąbrówka, within Bytów County, Pomeranian Voivodeship, in northern Poland.
