= Wężewo, Masovian Voivodeship =

Wężewo
- Village
- Location within Poland
- Coordinates: 52°55′N 20°56′E
- Country: Poland
- Voivodeship: Masovian
- County: Przasnysz
- Gmina: Krasne
- Population: 300

Wężewo [vɛ̃ˈʐɛvɔ] is a village in the administrative district of Gmina Krasne, within Przasnysz County, Masovian Voivodeship, in east-central Poland.
