= Kleszczyniec =

- Village
- Location within Poland
- Coordinates: 54°20′4″N 17°31′34″E
- Country: Poland
- Voivodeship: Pomeranian
- County: Bytów
- Gmina: Czarna Dąbrówka
- Population: 265

Kleszczyniec [klɛʂˈt͡ʂɨɲɛt͡s] (German: Kleschinz) is a village in the administrative district of Gmina Czarna Dąbrówka, within Bytów County, Pomeranian Voivodeship, in northern Poland.

== History ==
The village was a fief of the Puttkamers until 1725, when Marie von Puttkamer, through marrying Georg von Zitzewitz, brought Kleszczyniec among others to a union. In 1784 there were twenty houses and a farm in the village. In 1799 the Puttkamers became the owners of the village again, in 1824 Albert Puttkamer sold the property to the von Reckow family, and in 1857 they sold it to the von Domarus family.

The village is known for the Hops art gallery with an exhibition of works and an ethnographic section.
