= Jerzkowice =

- Village
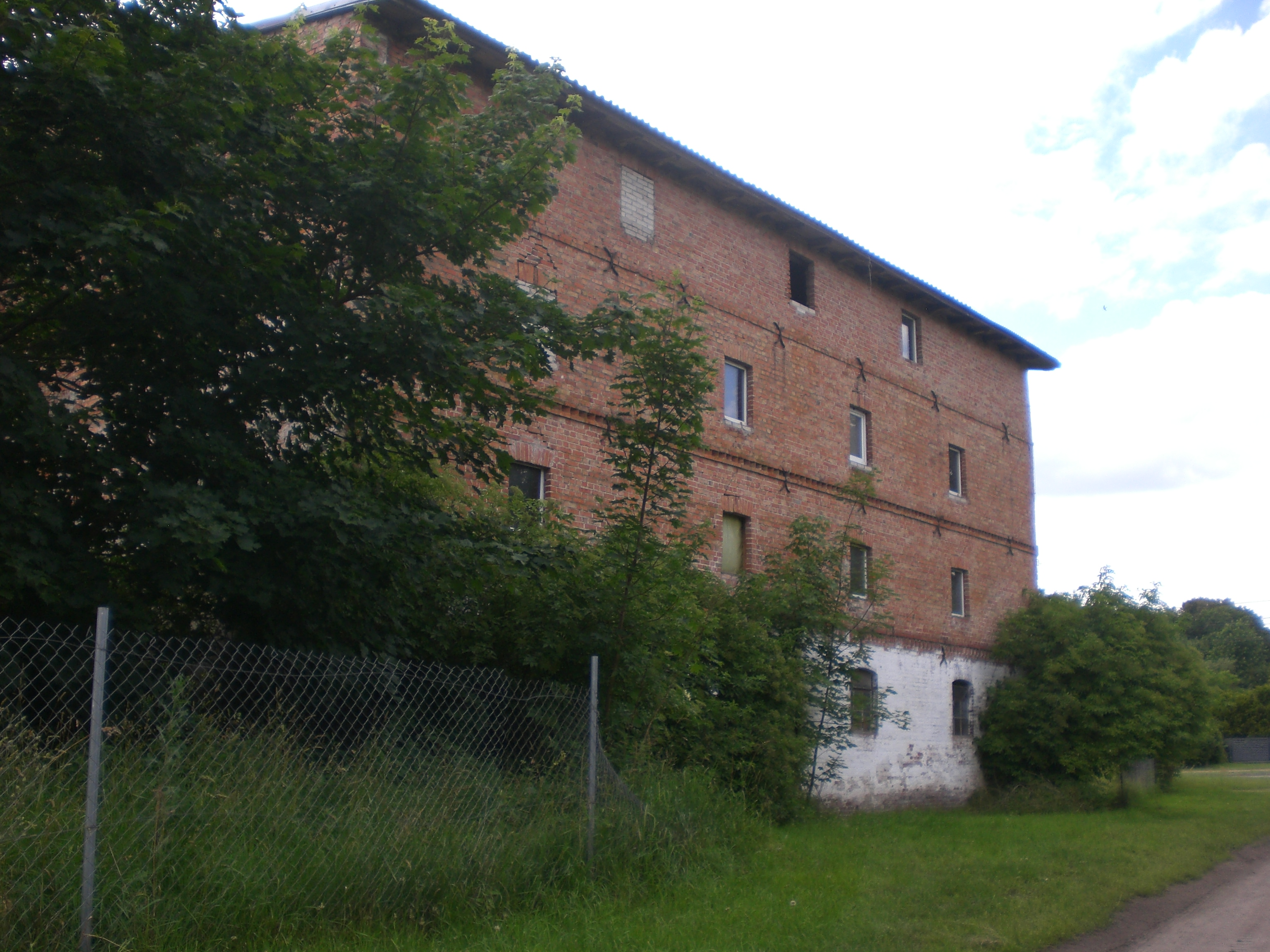

- Location within Poland
- Coordinates: 54°19′44″N 17°34′52″E
- Country: Poland
- Voivodeship: Pomeranian
- County: Bytów
- Gmina: Czarna Dąbrówka

Population
  - Total: 301
- Time zone: UTC+1 (CET)
  - Summer (DST): UTC+2 (CEST)
- Vehicle registration: GBY

Jerzkowice [jɛʂkɔˈvit͡sɛ] is a village in the administrative district of Gmina Czarna Dąbrówka, within Bytów County, Pomeranian Voivodeship, in northern Poland.

It is a linear settlement.

== Etymology ==
The name of the village comes from the Old Polish male given name Jerzk or Jerzyk.
