= Gliśnica, Pomeranian Voivodeship =

Village in Pomerania, Poland

Gliśnica
- Village
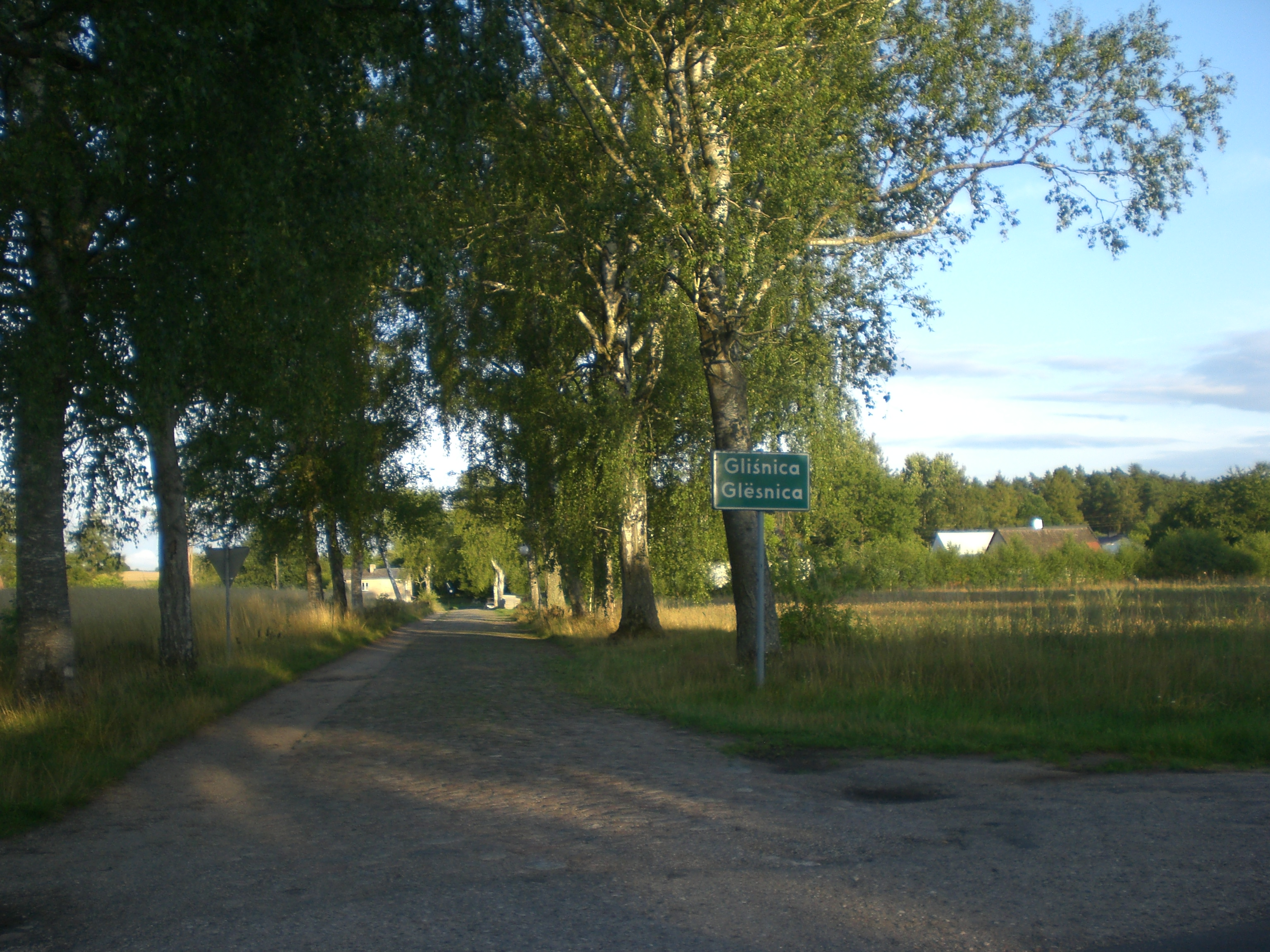

- Location within Poland
- Coordinates: 54°22′3″N 17°41′4″E
- Country: Poland
- Voivodeship: Pomeranian
- County: Bytów
- Gmina: Czarna Dąbrówka

Gliśnica [ɡliɕˈnit͡sa] is a village in the administrative district of Gmina Czarna Dąbrówka, within Bytów County, Pomeranian Voivodeship, in northern Poland.
