= Podkomorzyce =

- Village
- Location within Poland
- Coordinates: 54°22′2″N 17°30′33″E
- Country: Poland
- Voivodeship: Pomeranian
- County: Bytów
- Gmina: Czarna Dąbrówka
- Population: 138

Podkomorzyce [pɔtkɔmɔˈʐɨt͡sɛ] (German: Niemietzke, 1938–1945 Puttkamerhof) is a village in the administrative district of Gmina Czarna Dąbrówka, within Bytów County, Pomeranian Voivodeship, in northern Poland.
