= Zawiaty =

- Village
- Location within Poland
- Coordinates: 54°19′59″N 17°37′6″E
- Country: Poland
- Voivodeship: Pomeranian
- County: Bytów
- Gmina: Czarna Dąbrówka

Zawiaty [zaˈvjatɨ] (Kashubian: Zôwiat, German Saviat, 1938-1945 Seeblick) is a village in the administrative district of Gmina Czarna Dąbrówka, within Bytów County, Pomeranian Voivodeship, in northern Poland.
