= 1935 Free City of Danzig parliamentary election =

- 7 April 1935
- All 72 members of the Volkstag
Party	Leader	Vote %	Seats	+/–
NSDAP	Albert Forster	59.31	43	+5
Soc.-Dem.	Arthur Brill	16.05	12	−1
Centre	Richard Stachnik	13.41	10	0
DNVP	Gerhard Weise	4.17	3	−1
Polish List	Bronisław Budzyński	3.53	2	0
Communists	Anton Plenikowski	3.37	2	−3
This lists parties that won seats. See the complete results below.
Senate President before	Senate President after
Arthur Greiser; NSDAP	Arthur Greiser; NSDAP

The sixth and last elections to the Volkstag, the parliament of the Free City of Danzig, were held on April 7, 1935. Whilst a Volkstag election was not due until 1937, the ruling National Socialist German Workers Party (NSDAP) brought a snap election hoping to acquire a two-thirds majority in the assembly required to modify the constitution of the Free City of Danzig. The NSDAP massively dominated the election campaign, with the state machinery being mobilized to canvass for votes. Opposition parties were harassed and routinely violently attacked, especially in rural areas. In the end the NSDAP failed to achieve the two-thirds majority, and in spite of winning an absolute majority of votes and seats the election was widely seen as a set-back for the party. The opposition parties demanded that the election be declared invalid and petitioned the Danzig courts and the League of Nations demanding fresh elections.

== Background ==
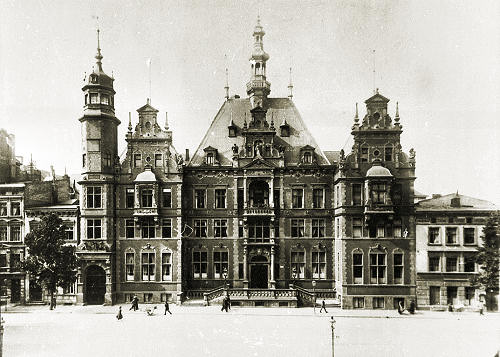
The Volkstag building

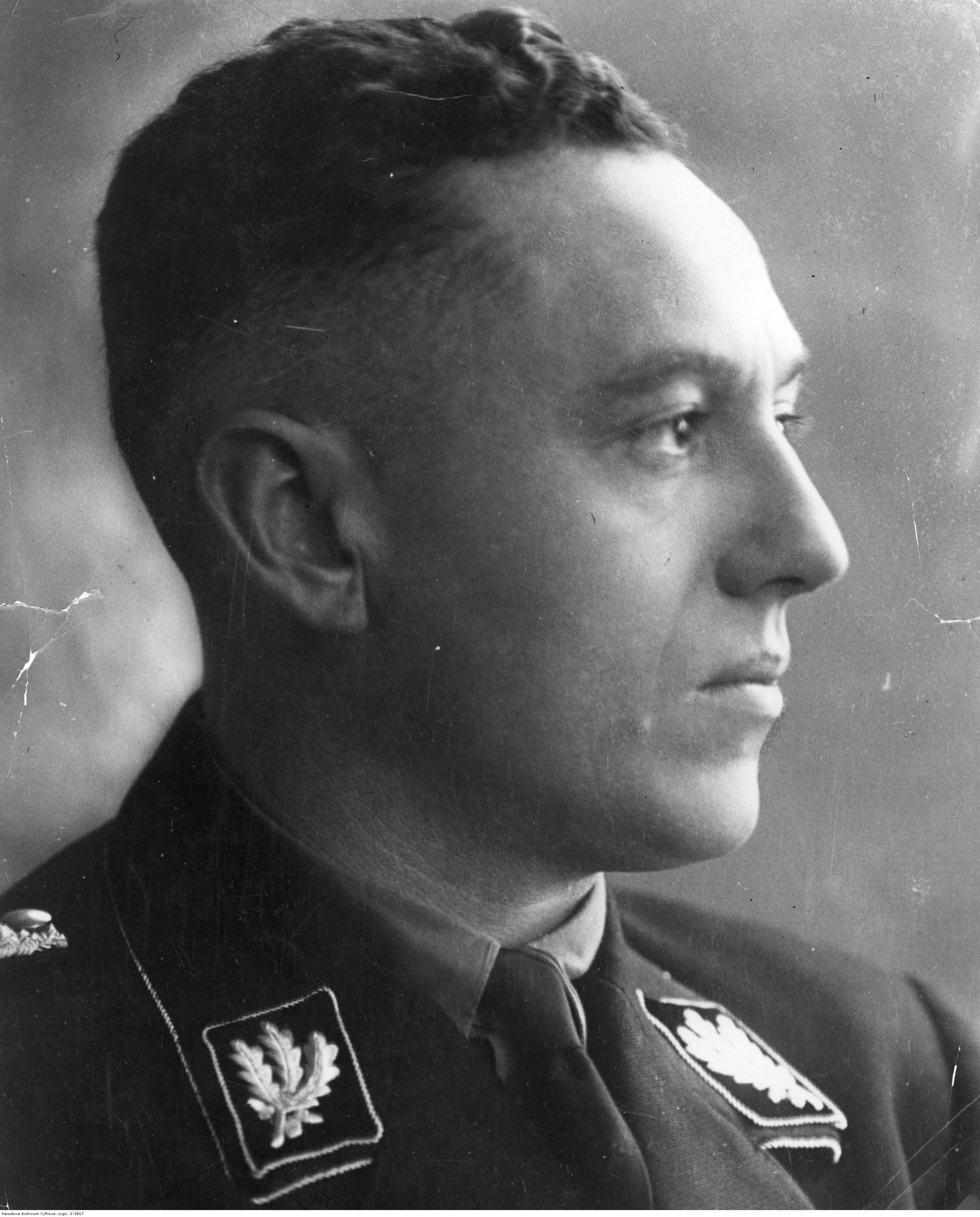
Albert Forster, the leader of the NSDAP in the Free City of Danzig

The National Socialist German Workers Party (NSDAP) had won a majority of votes and seats in the 1933 Volkstag election. Hermann Rauschning, a former German National People's Party (DNVP) politician who had joined the NSDAP, became the Senate President of the Free City of Danzig. But the relationship between Rauschning and the NSDAP party organization soon turned sour, as Rauschning favoured a line of international détente and adherence to the international treaties governing the Free City whilst the NSDAP party organization called for hard-line approach towards the opposition (demanding measures such as banning the Social Democratic Party, arresting Catholic priests, etc.). A key issue increasing the tensions between Rauschning and the NSDAP gauleiter (party organization leader) Albert Forster was the financing the Great National Socialist Job Creation Program, a program modeled on the anti-unemployment scheme of the German Reich. But whilst in the German Reich the government could fund its unemployment scheme through public debt, the Bank of Danzig could not do the same due to restrictions imposed by the League of Nations mandate. And though the Great National Socialist Job Creation Program had limited impact on unemployment in the Free City of Danzig, it prompted the Free City of Danzig government to introduce budget cuts for other state activities as well as reductions in public sector salaries and pensions.

Rauschning was personally instructed by Adolf Hitler to respect the decisions of the party. On November 22, 1934 the NSDAP Volkstag fraction issued a no-cofidence letter to Rauschning, who resigned as Senate President the following day. The Senate Vice President and NSDAP politician Arthur Greiser became the new Senate President. With the ousting of the unpopular and moderate Rauschning, Forster was able to strengthen his hold over the party and the Free City of Danzig.

In the wake of the January 13, 1935 Saar plebiscite (in which 91% of the voters had supported reunification with Germany), the NSDAP moved to dissolve to Volkstag and call for fresh elections two years ahead of schedule. Forster and NSDAP were hoping to take advantage of the Saar vote momentum and seeking to gain a two-thirds majority. A two-thirds Volkstag majority was needed under the League of Nations mandate in order to be able change the constitution of the Free City of Danzig. In the November 18, 1934 District Assembly (kreistag) elections in the Danziger Niederung and Großes Werder districts the NSDAP had won 77.18% of the vote - making the goal of a two-thirds Volkstag majority seem probable to Forster.

On February 12, 1935 Senate President Greiser sent a letter to the NSDAP Volkstag fraction, requesting the dissolution of the parliament and the holding of fresh elections. On February 21, 1935 the Volkstag voted to dissolve itself - with 41 votes in favour, 12 against and 3 abstentions. On February 26, 1935 the Official Gazette announced that elections would be held on April 7, 1935.

As of early 1935 time the Catholic clergy in the Free City of Danzig was effectively split into three factions - Poles, Germans and Bishop Edward O'Rourke. In his Lenten letter, which was issued in the lead-up to the elections, Bishop O'Rourke avoided to directly attack the ruling National Socialists. Rather he warned of the dangers of Bolshevism and Social Democracy, a move that aggravated the divisions in the Danzig clergy and isolated Bishop O'Rourke.

== Campaigning ==
=== List 1 - National Socialist German Workers Party (Hitler Movement) ===
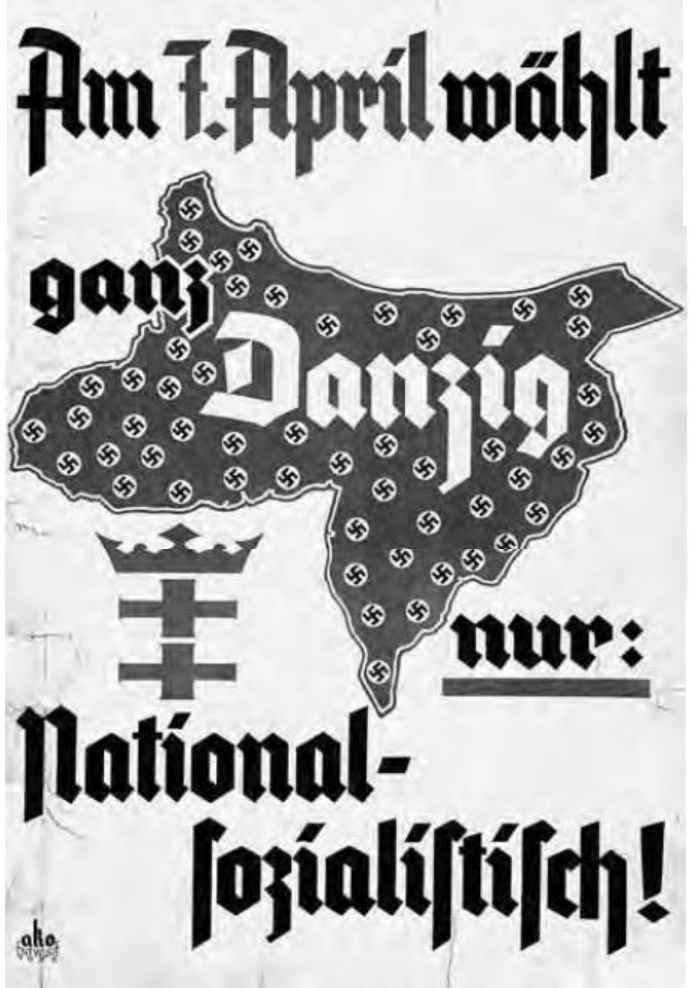
NSDAP campaign poster

The National Socialist list was headed by Arthur Greiser (Senate President, Danzig-Oliva), Lothar Rettelsky (farmer, Zugdam), Wilhelm von Wnuck (Senator, Danzig) and Johann Gobert (fisherman, Palschau). The NSDAP electoral campaign began on March 16, 1935. Its campaign slogan was 'Fight the Separatists! - Danzig remains National Socialist', borrowing from the discourse used in the Saar plebiscite campaign. Per Gippert (2005) the NSDAP election campaign was carried out "with a tried-and-tested formula: intimidation and terrorizing members of the opposition parties on the one hand, and elaborate and massively orchestrated election propaganda on the other". Most of the election rallies of the opposition were attacked. The Sturmabteilung (SA) could operate with near total impunity from the police and judiciary.

Virtually the whole state machinery was mobilized for the NSDAP election campaign, including police, labour service, air defenses, etc. Swastika flags and banners were hung across the city. Some 1,300 electoral meetings were carried out across the Free City of Danzig during the three weeks of campaigning, often held in large meeting halls. The National Socialist press claimed that some 80,000 people had taken part in the main electoral rally at the Albert Forster Stadium. The Danzig radio broadcast massively relayed NSDAP campaign messages during five weeks, whilst not giving any space to opposition voices during the same time period.

The NSDAP election campaign was joined by the four most prominent ministers from the German Reich - Hermann Göring, Joseph Goebbels Rudolf Hess and Bernhard Rust. Half a dozen gauleiters (such as the Saar gauleiter Josef Bürckel) and about a dozen of the top propagandists from Germany arrived in Danzig to assist in the campaigning.

During the election campaign Senate President Greiser repeatedly attacked the League of Nations High Commissioner Seán Lester, arguing that Lester protected 'the morbid and unshaven opposition parties' and that he was 'interfering in the internal affairs of the Free City'.

The former Senate President Rauschning, who had retired to his estate in Warnau after his resignation, was targeted in the NSDAP election campaign. During a rally in Danzig City, Julius Streicher denounced Rauschning as a "traitor to the people and the country" and accused him of having "sold Danzig to the Jews". The attacks prompted Rauschning to briefly return to the public sphere, by issuing an open letter to Gauleiter Forster and appealing to the voters of the Free City of Danzig not to hand over power to an "unrestricted dictator" and a "policy of adventures".

=== List 2 - Social Democratic ===
The Social Democratic list was headed by Arthur Brill (construction worker, Danzig), Willy Moritz (employee, Danzig), Gertrud Müller (businesswoman, Danzig) and Karl Töpfer (typesetter, Danzig). The Social Democrats held seven campaign meetings during the electoral campaign, one of them in a large hall. The Social Democrats suffered frequent violent attacks from the SA and police. Tear gas was used to interrupt Social Democratic campaign meetings. In March 1935 Social Democratic party founder in Ladekopp Paul Haag died from wound inflicted during the 1934 District Assembly elections.

The Social Democratic newspaper Danziger Volksstimme was banned twice during the election campaign period. Only seven issues of the newspaper could be published during the election campaign period, which severely hampered the Social Democratic campaign. Social Democratic newspaper vendors were assaulted. The National Socialists organized an intimidation campaign against the residences of prominent Social Democrats, in particular in rural areas, writing the message 'here lives a traitor to the Fatherland' on their houses. The Social Democratic Party reported a some 500 violent attacks in the rural areas during the election campaign. Per historian Christopher Pallaske (1999), the pre-electoral violence against the Social Democrats took 'pogrom-like proportions'.

=== List 3 - Plenikowski List ===
The Communist Party had been banned in the Free City of Danzig on May 28, 1934. However, ahead of the 1935 elections a 'Committee of Danzig State Citizens of communist World View' was constituted without objections from state authorities. The communists contested the election under the banner 'Plenikowski List'. The list was headed by Anton Plenikowski (teacher, Danzig-Schidlitz), Otto Langnau (farm worker, Brunau), Paul Serotzki (dock worker, Danzig-Lauental) and Meta Totzki (housewife, Zoppot). The communists were unable to hold any public election campaign meetings.

=== List 4 - Centre Party ===
The Centre Party list was headed by Dr. Richard Stachnik (teacher, Danzig), Karl Formell (publisher, Zoppot), Paul Weiß (teacher, Zoppot) and Albert Posack (police sergeant, Danzig-Oliva). The Centre Party held a handful of public campaign meetings. Similarly to the Social Democrats, the Centre Party public campaign meetings were attacked. Danziger Volks-Zeitung, a newspaper close to the Centre Party, suffered confiscations multiple times during the election campaign period. On March 25, 1935 Danziger Volks-Zeitung was reprimanded for publishing reports about disruptions of the Centre Party electoral campaign meetings.

=== List 5 - Weise List ===
The German National People's Party (DNVP) contested the election under the banner 'Weise List'. The list was headed by Gerhard Weise (lawyer, Zoppot), Carl Steinbrück (merchant, Danzig-Langfuhr), Rudolf Gamm (farmer, Ridelswalde) and Kurt Blavier (Senator, Danzig). By 1935 the DNVP had lost most of its electoral appeal but still had its core party organization largely intact.

=== List 6 - Pietsch Group (Freie Frontkämpfer) ===
Freie Frontkämpfer ('Free Front Fighters') was a small party set up to advocate for interests of ex-servicemen, who had refused to join the National Socialist fold. Its leader Gustav Pietsch was a sea captain, who had moved to Danzig in 1918. Pietsch had been active in the Frontkämpferbund veterans' union, which was linked to the DNVP. However, Pietsch was expelled from Frontkämpferbund in 1933 for his opposition to fascism. The list of the Pietsch group had 15 candidates was headed by Pietsch himself, Reinhard Weigl (merchant employee, Zoppot), Bruno Mischke (customs operations assistant, Danizg-Glettkau) and Friedrich Gehring (mechanic, Danzig). Its press organ Feldgrauer Alarm was banned on March 12, 1935 for a period of five months.

=== List 7 - Polish List ===
In the 1933 elections, the Polish vote had been split between two lists. Ahead of the 1935 election a meeting was held at the offices of the General Commissariat of the Polish Republic in the Free City of Danzig on March 4, 1935, chaired by M. Klott, to form a single Polish candidate list and setting up a Polish Electoral Committee, with the purpose of creating a single Polish socio-political organization in the Free City of Gdansk after the elections. The Polish Electoral Committee formed on March 4, 1935 was chaired by Tadeusz Wejchert, and included Anton Lendzion and Franciszek Sędzicki from the Polish Community in the Free City of Danzig and Bolesław Paszota and Dr. Aleksander Schiller from the Union of Poles of the Free City of Danzig.

But board of the Polish Community rejected the March 4, 1935 arrangement, which prompted a negative reaction from the Union of Polish Trade Unions of the Free City of Danzig. Over the following days, parleys and negotiations took place, with high-ranking officials Warsaw mediating between the different Polish minority groups in Danzig. On March 6, 1935 the Union of Polish Trade Unions adopted a resolution calling for "a single electoral list and the further pacification of relations in the harmonious coexistence of Poles in Danzig". The Union of Polish Trade Unions threatened to break away from the Polish Community, and the chairman of the Polish Community Roman Ogryczak threatened to resign. On March 8, 1935 the Union of Trade Unions formally apologized to the Union of Poles High Committee for Child Care and Commission for Community Centres Leonia Papée for previous criticisms against the management of nurseries and community centres, as a conciliatory move.

Eventually the different Danzig organization agreed on a single electoral list. However, differences persisted regarding the choice of candidates - the Union of Poles presented a draft list headed by Bronisław Budzyński, Roman Ogryczak, Reverend Bernard Wiecki and Ignacy Kurzyński. On the other hand, the Polish Community draft list was headed by Lendzion, Budzyński, B. Wesołowski and Reverend Wiecki. Klott, mediating between the two organizations, proposed the first slot on the candidate should be a person accepted by both sides and the second slot being awarded to a nominee of the Polish Community. The compromise solution was a list headed by Budzyński, Lendzion, Reverend Wiecki and B. Wesołowski, followed by other personalities from the Union of Poles, Polish Community and the Union of Polish Trade Unions. All in all, there was 60 candidates on the list. On March 10, 1935 the Polish Electoral Committee held a campaign rally at the Messehalle on Wallgasse. Some 5,000 people filled the hall. The meeting was chaired by Wejchert, and speakers included Budzyński, Lendzion and Wiecki. The meeting concluded with singing of Boże, coś Polskę. On March 31, 1935 a demonstration was held in Danzig, with banners carrying slogans like "Down with Election Terror", "No Progress in Danzig without Harmony with Poland" and "Poles vote for List 7". The following day the Polish-language newspaper Gazeta Gdańska was banned for allegedly disrupting relations between the Free City of Danzig, Poland and the League of Nations.

== Results ==
=== Overall election result ===
Party	Votes	%	Seats	+/–
List 1 - National Socialist German Workers Party (Hitler Movement)	139,423	59.31	43	+5
List 2- Social Democratic	37,729	16.05	12	–1
List 4 - Centre	31,522	13.41	10	0
List 5 - Weise List	9,805	4.17	3	–1
List 7 - Polish List	8,294	3.53	2	0
List 3 - Plenikowski List	7,916	3.37	2	-3
List 6 - Pietsch Group (Freie Frontkämpfer)	373	0.16	0	New
Total	235,062	100.00	72	0
Valid votes	235,062	99.25		
Invalid/blank votes	1,770	0.75		
Total votes	236,832	100.00		
Registered voters/turnout	250,735	94.46		
Source: League of Nations, Morrow & Sieveking, Danziger Statistische Mitteilungen, Neumeyer

=== By district ===
Results of the 1935 Free City of Danzig parliamentary election by district
Party	Danzig City				Zoppot City				Danziger Höhe				Danziger Niederung				Großes Werder			
Party	Votes	%	Votes +/-	% +/-	Votes	%	Votes +/-	% +/-	Votes	%	Votes +/-	% +/-	Votes	%	Votes +/-	% +/-	Votes	%	Votes +/-	% +/-
List 1 - National Socialist (Note: Comparison with the 1933 election includes the 1,698 votes for the Young German Movement.)	84,770	53.04%	+21,110	+5.47	8,019	53.95%	1,752	+5.97	12,703	68.97%	+68	+21.61	12,918	81.63%	+1,641	+16.46	21,013	80.43%	+5,819	+16.24
List 2- Social Democratic	31,516	19.72%	+5,223	+0.07	1,404	9.45%	+356	+1.42	1,611	8.75%	-2,949	-8.34	1,561	9.86%	-1,338	-6.89	1,637	6.27%	-1,666	-7.69
List 4 - Centre	23,524	14.72%	3,769	-0.04	3,093	20.81%	154	-1.69	2,498	13.56%	-2,576	-5.46	384	2.43%	-403	-2.12	2,023	7.73%	-761	-4.02
List 5 - Weise List (Note: Comparison with the 1933 votes for the Kampffront Schwarz-Weiß-Rot and the Danzig German Houseowners Party)	7,406	4.63%	-2,823	-3.01	1,152	7.75%	-353	-3.77	413	2.24%	-933	-2.80	421	2.66%	-353	-1.81	413	1.58%	-304	-1.45
List 7 - Polish List (Note: Comparison with the 1933 votes for the two Polish lists contesting that election)	6,313	3.95%	+1,529	+0.38	779	5.24%	+222	+0.98	901	4.89%	-256	+0.56	28	0.18%	-41	-0.22	272	1.04%	+101	+0.32
List 3- Plenikowski List (Note: Comparison with the 1933 votes for the Communist Party of Germany)	6,076	3.80%	-3,033	-3.00	380	2.56%	-366	-3.15	273	1.48%	-1,635	-5.67	475	3.00%	-1,025	-5.67	712	2.73%	-791	-3.62
List 6 - Pietsch Group	222	0.14%			36	0.24%			19	0.10%			39	0.25%			57	0.22%		
Total number of valid votes	159,827				14,863				18,418				15,826				26,127			
Invalid votes	1,194				107				130				121				218			
Eligble voters	171,655				15,590				19,398				16,782				27,310			
Turnout (%)	93.81%				96.02%				95.62%				95.02%				96.47%			
Number of electoral precincts	189				8				87				61				102			
Notes																				
Sources: Danziger Statistische Mitteilungen, Danziger Allgemeine Zeitung, Gazeta Gdańska, Danziger Volks-Zeitung

==== Result in Danzig-Schidlitz ====
Schidlitz was traditionally a red working-class suburb, which retained some rural characterists. Whilst the Social Democrats had obtained 18.8% of the vote in the Danzig City suburbs and 15% in outlying areas, they managed to obtain 25.3% of the vote in Danzig-Schidlitz.

1935 Free City of Danzig parliamentary election in Danzig-Schidlitz
List	Votes	%
List 1 - National Socialist German Workers Party (Hitler Movement)	4,584	43.01%
List 2 - Social Democrat	2,695	25.29%
List 4 - Centre	2,089	19.60%
List 3 - Plenikowski List	615	5.77%
List 7 - Polish List	335	3.14%
List 5 - Weise List	329	3.09%
List 6 - Pietsch Group (Freie Frontkämpfer)	11	0.10%

==== Result in Stutthof ====
In Stutthof, a small Protestant community in the Danziger Niederung district, the NSDAP list got 90.1% of the votes, the Social Democrats 4.6%, the Communists 2.8% and the German National list 1.8%.

=== Elected deputies ===
Party	Deputies
List 1 - National Socialist German Workers Party (Hitler Movement)	Arthur Greiser
List 1 - National Socialist German Workers Party (Hitler Movement)	Lothar Rettelsky
List 1 - National Socialist German Workers Party (Hitler Movement)	Wilhelm von Wnuck
List 1 - National Socialist German Workers Party (Hitler Movement)	Johann Gobert
List 1 - National Socialist German Workers Party (Hitler Movement)	Wilhelm Huth
List 1 - National Socialist German Workers Party (Hitler Movement)	Otto Ehrlichmann
List 1 - National Socialist German Workers Party (Hitler Movement)	Adalbert Boeck
List 1 - National Socialist German Workers Party (Hitler Movement)	Gustav Nispel
List 1 - National Socialist German Workers Party (Hitler Movement)	Georg Thimm
List 1 - National Socialist German Workers Party (Hitler Movement)	Willy Krampitz
List 1 - National Socialist German Workers Party (Hitler Movement)	Norbert Appaly
List 1 - National Socialist German Workers Party (Hitler Movement)	Eugen Manteuffel
List 1 - National Socialist German Workers Party (Hitler Movement)	Otto Andres
List 1 - National Socialist German Workers Party (Hitler Movement)	Gustav Sukatus
List 1 - National Socialist German Workers Party (Hitler Movement)	Karl Braun
List 1 - National Socialist German Workers Party (Hitler Movement)	Walter Maaß
List 1 - National Socialist German Workers Party (Hitler Movement)	Waldemar Wilhelm
List 1 - National Socialist German Workers Party (Hitler Movement)	Paul Batzer
List 1 - National Socialist German Workers Party (Hitler Movement)	Otto Heß
List 1 - National Socialist German Workers Party (Hitler Movement)	Gustav Fieguth
List 1 - National Socialist German Workers Party (Hitler Movement)	Herbert Busch
List 1 - National Socialist German Workers Party (Hitler Movement)	Erich Willers
List 1 - National Socialist German Workers Party (Hitler Movement)	Gerhard Schories
List 1 - National Socialist German Workers Party (Hitler Movement)	Paul Nicklas
List 1 - National Socialist German Workers Party (Hitler Movement)	David Patzke
List 1 - National Socialist German Workers Party (Hitler Movement)	Gerd von Boetticher
List 1 - National Socialist German Workers Party (Hitler Movement)	Max Lange
List 1 - National Socialist German Workers Party (Hitler Movement)	Paul Harder
List 1 - National Socialist German Workers Party (Hitler Movement)	Kurt Kapeller
List 1 - National Socialist German Workers Party (Hitler Movement)	Max Bertling
List 1 - National Socialist German Workers Party (Hitler Movement)	Karl Schäfer
List 1 - National Socialist German Workers Party (Hitler Movement)	Karl Bartsch
List 1 - National Socialist German Workers Party (Hitler Movement)	Hans Kuhn
List 1 - National Socialist German Workers Party (Hitler Movement)	Edwin Kamrowski
List 1 - National Socialist German Workers Party (Hitler Movement)	Gustav Kowalke
List 1 - National Socialist German Workers Party (Hitler Movement)	Albert Tolius
List 1 - National Socialist German Workers Party (Hitler Movement)	John Rabe
List 1 - National Socialist German Workers Party (Hitler Movement)	Heinrich Waschke
List 1 - National Socialist German Workers Party (Hitler Movement)	Adalbert Heldt
List 1 - National Socialist German Workers Party (Hitler Movement)	Erwin Johst
List 1 - National Socialist German Workers Party (Hitler Movement)	Johann Leufgen
List 1 - National Socialist German Workers Party (Hitler Movement)	Paul Kindel
List 1 - National Socialist German Workers Party (Hitler Movement)	Edmund Beyl
List 2 - Social Democratic	Arthur Brill
List 2 - Social Democratic	Willy Moritz
List 2 - Social Democratic	Gertrud Müller
List 2 - Social Democratic	Karl Töpfer
List 2 - Social Democratic	Eduard Schmidt
List 2 - Social Democratic	Fritz Weber
List 2 - Social Democratic	Wilhelm Godau
List 2 - Social Democratic	Erich Brost
List 2 - Social Democratic	Johannes Kruppke
List 2 - Social Democratic	Hans Wichmann
List 2 - Social Democratic	Johannes Knaust
List 2 - Social Democratic	Johannes Mau
List 3 - Plenikowski List	Anton Plenikowski
List 3 - Plenikowski List	Otto Langnau
List 4 - Centre	Richard Stachnik
List 4 - Centre	Karl Formell
List 4 - Centre	Paul Weiß
List 4 - Centre	Albert Posack
List 4 - Centre	Franz Potrykus
List 4 - Centre	Bruno Kurowski
List 4 - Centre	Johannes Höhn
List 4 - Centre	Franz Klein
List 4 - Centre	Alfons Schmich
List 4 - Centre	Johannes Günther
List 5 - Weise List	Gerhard Weise
List 5 - Weise List	Carl Steinbrück
List 5 - Weise List	Rudolf Gamm
List 7 - Polish List	Bronisław Budzyński
List 7 - Polish List	Anton Lendzion

== Aftermath ==
=== Reactions ===
Prior to the election, the NSDAP had been very confident that to polls would deliver a resounding victory and a stable two-thirds Volkstag majority. For example, three days before the election Göring stated that "[t]he battle is already won before it has begun!". Greiser had stated to foreign diplomats that NSDAP would win 90% of the votes. But whilst the NSDAP increased its share of votes and seats, the party had not achieved the desired two-thirds majority. The NSDAP Gauleiter Forster was supposed to make the first announcement on of the preliminary results on radio on the night between April 7 and 8, 1935, but whilst live on air he went silent when seeing the numbers in front of him. A planned SA/SS victory parade was abruptly cancelled. Per Ernst Sodeikat (1966), the 1935 Free City of Danzig election "became the first major defeat suffered by National Socialism in the German-speaking world". The Polish historian Marek Andrzejewski (1994) argued that "[a] significant defeat was inflicted by the opposition on the NSDAP in elections of April 7, 1935, which, despite electoral terror and fraud, failed to achieve the desired two-thirds majority." Andrzejewski argues that failing to grasp the difference between the rural and urban vote might have led Forster to misinterpret the popularity of the NSDAP around the time of the November 1934 local elections.

The Social Democrats, Centre and Polish List had managed to keep most of its voter base intact. The front-page of the Centre-linked newspaper Danziger Volks-Zeitung boasted that "[t]he NSDAP failed to achieve its goal – despite radical propaganda, 40% of voters rejected the NSDAP – the Centre Party and Social Democrats maintained their position – the NSDAP suffered a narrow defeat despite a simple majority – constitutional amendments are not possible – in Danzig City and Zoppot, the NSDAP only secured a slim majority – strengthening of the opposition". In the international press the election result was framed as a set-back for the ruling National Socialists, with headlines such as 'Hitler foiled in Danzig election' (News Chronicle, April 8, 1935). The New York Times ran an editorial titled 'The Nazi Defeat'. The Jewish Telegraphic Agency bulletin after the election wrote "The Jewish population of Danzig today welcomed the results of yesterday's parliamentary elections as removing for the first time the threat that the Jews of Danzig would be placed in the same position as the Jews of Germany." Lodzer Volkszeitung, the organ of the German Socialist Labour Party of Poland (DSAP), highlighted that the in Danzig City proper the gap between the ruling National Socialist and opposition was not that significant, and emphasized that Social Democrats had gained 5,000 votes and Centre Party another gained 2,500 votes in the city.

In the aftermath of the polls the National Socialist press outlets struggled to identify plausible explanations for the failure to achieve the two-thirds majority, one argument raised was that the NSDAP had managed to gain 30,000 additional voters in spite of the incumbent National Socialist government having taken unpopular measures. Reportedly, the regional SS leader Erich von dem Bach-Zelewski argued that voters had reacted negatively to corrupt practices and arrogance of NSDAP leaders, and that Greiser's divorce and SA leader Max Linsmayer's slander campaign against Greiser had damaged the confidence in the party.

=== Court case and revised election result ===
The newly elected Volkstag held its first meeting on April 30, 1935. Following the elections all of the opposition parties, except the Polish List, filed a lawsuit alleging various irregularities such as illegal manipulations, threats of dismissals for public employees refusing to support the NSDAP, that the secrecy of the ballot had not been respected and that non-citizens had been brought in by bus and train to vote. On November 14, 1935 Walter von Hagens, as presiding judge of the First Civil Senate of the Danzig High Court, issued a compromise ruling - on one hand acknowledging that there had been "irregularities" and "widespread fraud and violence" in the Volkstag election process, but on the other hand rejecting calls for new elections. The election was declared invalid in 18 electoral precincts. Based on the court ruling, one seat was transferred from NSDAP to the Social Democrats. The revised electoral results, based on the court ruling, were as follows;

Party	Votes	%	Seats	+/–
List 1 - National Socialist German Workers Party (Hitler Movement)	128,619	57.31	42	-1
List 2- Social Democratic	37,804	16.84	13	+1
List 4 - Centre	31,576	14.07	10	0
List 5 - Weise List	9,822	4.38	3	0
List 7 - Polish List	8,311	3.70	2	0
List 3- Plenikowski List	7,935	3.54	2	0
List 6 - Pietsch Group (Freie Frontkämpfer)	375	0.17	0	0
Total	224,442	100.00	72	–
Source: Reich und Länder, Staatsanzeiger für die Freie Stadt Danzig

The reduction of the National Socialist vote tally provoked a furious reaction in the Senate. The opposition was also disappointed, and now petitioned the League of Nations demanding new elections to be held. Moreover, a separate lawsuit filed by Plenikowski against the ban on the Communist Party had been rejected by the court.

On December 5, 1935 a meeting of the Election Committee conducted a recalculation of the seat distribution of the Volktag on the basis of the November 14 court ruling. In the adjusted list of elected Volkstag members issued by the Election Committee, the NSDAP had removed six of its deputies previous announced elected - Senate President Arthur Greiser, Lothar Rettelsky, Wilhelm von Wnuck, Wilhelm Huth, Adalbert Boeck and the Bank of Danzig president Karl Schäfer were no longer listed as Volkstag deputies. The five new NSDAP Volkstag members were now Erich Schelm, Erich Temp, Franz Schramm, Karl Gall and Herbert Schulz. The seat that was now transferred from NSDAP to the Social Democrats was taken by Meta Malikowski, house-wife from Danzig.

== Local elections ==
In parallel to the Volkstag election, there were also a District Assembly (kreistag) election in Danziger Höhe and a city council election in Zoppot. There were also municipal elections in Danziger Höhe, in which Polish lists obtained a total of 15 seats (an increase from 5 in previous elections).

=== Danziger Höhe District Assembly ===
1935 election to the Danziger Höhe District Assembly
List	Votes	%	Seats
National Socialists	11,902	68.85%	15
Social Democrats	1,573	9.10%	2
Neumann List (Communist)	260	1.50%	0
Centre	2,406	13.92%	3
Penner List	325	1.88%	0
Polish list	821	4.75%	1
Invalid votes	160		

=== Zoppot City Council ===
1935 election to the Zoppot City Council
List	Votes	%	Seats	
National Socialists	6,876	50.91%	15	▲8
Social Democrats	1,330	9.85%	3	±0
Communists	367	2.72%	0	▼2
Centre	2,947	21.82%	7	▲1
Liste Weber-Weise	1,258	9.31%	2	▼7
Polish List	728	5.39%	1	±0
Invalid votes	109			
