= Meta Preuß =

German politician (1903–1981)

Meta Preuß (born Meta Kroll; 18 January 1903 – 25 December 1981) was a German politician (KPD, SED). In November 1930 she was elected one of seven Communist Party members in the Parliament ("Volkstag") in the quasi-independent Free City of Danzig.

It is not clear from sources when her first marriage, which took place in 1924 and was to Hermann Totzki, ended, but on account of that marriage, sources relating to her career during the 1920s and 1930s sometimes identify her as Meta Totzki.

== Life ==
Meta Kroll was born into a working-class family in Danzig which at that time was the capital of the German province of West Prussia. By 1917 she was in Berlin, working as an assistant in a pharmacy. In May 1924 she married Hermann Totzki (1894–1965) and with him moved back to her birth city, which following frontier changes mandated in 1919 had now become the so-called "Free City of Danzig", neither part of the newly reduced German state nor of the newly reinstated Polish state, but still, at this stage, overwhelmingly German in terms of language and ethnicity, and included in a customs union with Poland. In 1927 she joined the Communist Party of Germany, and the next year she became the leader locally of the "Red Women's and Girl's League" ("Der Rote Frauen und Mädchenbund " / RFMB), established during a violent decade as the female section of the quasi-military wing of the Communist Party. In 1929, still aged only 26, she became a member of the party leadership team ("Bezirksleitung") for Danzig, with particular responsibility for women's matters.

On 16 November 1930 she was elected to the Danzig parliament (Volkstag). The communists received 10.2% of the votes cast in the election, which placed them in fifth place and entitled them to 7 places in the 72 seat assembly. (The composition of the chamber was dominated by the Social Democrats with 25.2% of the vote and the Nazis with 16.4%.) Although the party had 7 seats, the Communist group in the Volkstag was dominated by three of them: Anton Plenikowski, Helene Kreft and Meta Totzki herself.

During June 1931 she attended a training at the party's national "Rosa Luxemburg" Academy in Fichtenau on the edge of Berlin. Already, by the end of 1932, she was working illegally as a party instructor in Danzig. In January 1933 the backdrop changed with the Nazi power seizure in Germany which was followed, there, by a rapid switch to one-party dictatorship. During the early summer of 1933 many communists in Germany were arrested or fled abroad. Despite its semi-detached legal status, the Free City of Danzig was subject to many of the changes and pressures sweeping Germany: on 2 April 1934 Meta Totzki was arrested and sentenced by a Danzig court to three years in prison for "illegal political activities". At a Volkstag session on 2 May 1934 the assembly (where following a further election on 28 May 1933 the Nazi Party held a small overall majority) agreed to the implementation of the sentences against Totzki and against Felix Raschke, another communist assembly member.

Slightly more than three weeks later, on 26 May 1934, the Chief of Police Hellmut Froböß issued a decree that dissolved the Danzig Communist Party. The Nazi Senate President Hermann Rauschning endorsed this step with the assertion that in various criminal trials against leading officers of the Communist Party in Danzig, the illegal holding of guns had been established. Party members had used these weapons to fight against government orders. Another justification provided involved the production and distribution by communists of "illegal printed matter", which called for civil disobedience in the face of official orders.

Meta Totzki was released in November 1935 because of an amnesty. She next sold advertising space for a still semi-legal communist newspaper in Danzig. In June 1936 she fled to Warsaw where, for some of the time, she was able to support herself by working at the Soviet embassy. In September 1938 she emigrated to Sweden where she joined the growing group of exiled German communists.

She returned at the start of June 1946. Much had changed during and following the war. In Sweden she had married her second husband, Karl Preuß (1904–1981). Further frontier changes had left Danzig inside Poland, while ethnic cleansing on a massive scale meant there was no question, for ethnic Germans, of "returning" to Gdańsk. Meta Preuß and her husband settled instead in the Berlin region, now at the heart of the Soviet occupation zone (relaunched in October 1949 as the Soviet sponsored German Democratic Republic). She joined the newly created Socialist Unity Party ("Sozialistische Einheitspartei Deutschlands" / SED) and became the party's head of Social Welfare for central Berlin. In March 1947 she was a co-founder of the Union of Persecutees of the Nazi Regime ("Vereinigung der Verfolgten des Naziregimes " / VVN) and was elected to a senior position ("Schriftführerin") within it. Later she became chair of the local party group in Sangerhausen, a small town in the southwestern part of the Soviet zone. However, in 1949 she became seriously ill, and in 1950 she went into retirement.

Meta Preuß died on Christmas Day, 1981.

== Awards and honours ==
- 1968 Patriotic Order of Merit in bronze
