= Emma Döll =

German politician (1873–1930)

- Born: Emma Hohmann; 3 March 1873; Rastenburg, Province of Prussia, Germany
- Died: 1930; Free City of Danzig
- Occupations: activist and politician
- Political party: SPD; USPD; KPD
- Spouse: Eduard Döll (1873–1947)
- Children: Klara Döll (1903–1994)

Emma Döll (née Hohmann, 3 March 1873 – 1930) was a German politician (SPD/USPD/KPD).

== Life ==
Emma Hohmann was born in Rastenburg, a small garrison town then in the Province of Prussia. Her father was a railway official. Her school career included a stint at the agricultural academy in the nearby town of Prussian Holland. She then trained for employment as a cook: for several years she worked as a cook on large farming estates in East and West Prussia.

At the beginning of the twentieth century she was living in the southern part of the country, in Meiningen, where she married the tailor Eduard Döll (1873–1947). In 1906 the couple moved north, settling in Danzig. Here she became a member of the Social Democratic Party ("Sozialdemokratische Partei Deutschlands" / SPD). The issue of support for funding the war was contentious within the party from 1914, and in 1917 the SPD split apart over the issue. In 1918 or 1919 Döll switched to the breakaway group, launched the previous year as the Independent Social Democratic Party of Germany ("Unabhängige Sozialdemokratische Partei Deutschlands"/ USPD).

After the war ended, Danzig, for reasons of geography and history, was given a quasi-autonomous status by the victorious powers as a so-called "free city". The arrangement was presented as a compromise between the wishes of the German-speaking majority, who wished for their city and the surrounding region to remain part of Germany, and the Polish-speaking minority, who wished for it to become part of the newly re-created Polish state; the compromise satisfied neither community, which opened the way for a few fractious decades in local politics. In May 1920 Döll was elected as a USPD member of the constitutional assembly mandated to come up with a constitution for the newly redefined territory. Later, in December 1920, the constitutional assembly became the free city's 120 seat legislative assembly (Volkstag). Around this time, it was the USPD that split. Döll was part of the leftwing majority that then joined the newly formed Communist Party of Germany. At the Volkstag election in November 1923 the Communist Party vote share of just over 9% was well below the 17.5% achieved by the USPD in the elections for the constitutional Assembly election held in May 1920, but by 1923, the Communists had received sufficient votes to give them 11 seats in the assembly, and one of these went to Döll. She served the full term, until November 1927, after which she was no longer a member.

Three years later, in 1930, Döll died at the age of 56 or 57.
