= 1928 Free City of Danzig MP reduction referendum =

A referendum on reducing the number of MPs was held in the Free City of Danzig on 9 December 1928. Voters were presented with two different proposals on reducing the size of the 120-seat Volkstag and the Senate. Voters were only allowed to vote "yes" to one proposal, but neither received a majority in support. Two years later Volkstag members voted to reduce the size of the body to 72 seats.

== Background ==
The Free City of Danzig was created as an entity by the Treaty of Versailles. Its constitution came into force on 5 November 1922, and provided for a 120-seat Volkstag and a 22-member Senate, which functioned as the territory's cabinet. It also set out that Danzig City Council was elected by Volkstag members rather than the public.

On 21 September the Volkstag rejected a bill to reduce it in size; despite MPs voting by 72–2 to reduce their number, the quorum of 80 votes was missed. As a result of the vote, two citizen initiatives were started. The initiatives required the signature of at least 10% of voters, which based on there being 214,363 registered voters for the 1927 elections, was 21,437 signatures.

The "People's Will" (Volkswille) initiative collected 28,961 signatures. It proposed a 72-seat Volkstag, which would elect a 12-member Senate with 5 full-time members and 7 part-time members. Danzig City Council would still be elected by the Volkstag, but based on the proportion of votes received in the previous election.

The "Citizen Protection" (Bürgerschutz) initiative gathered 46,219 signatures, and proposed a 61-seat Volkstag, which would elect a 12-member Senate with 5 full-time members and 7 part-time members. It also proposed the direct election of Danzig City Council.

== Results ==
In order to be ratified, the proposal had to be approved by at least 50% of the number of registered voters in the 1927 elections. Voters could only vote on one of the proposals, and any ballot on which a vote had been cast for both proposals, even if they had votes "yes" to one and "no" to the other, was void.

A total of 73,739 people voted on the Citizens' Protection initiative, whilst 59,442 people voted on the People's Will initiative, with 99% of voters voting for one of the two. Just over 4,000 invalid ballots were cast.

Choice	Votes	%	% of registered voters in 1927
For People's Will	58,495	43.92	27.29
Against People's Will	947	0.71	0.44
For Citizen's Protection	73,179	54.95	34.14
Against Citizen's Protection	560	0.42	0.26
Invalid/blank votes	4,155	–	–
Total	137,336	100	–
Registered voters/turnout	215,545	63.72	–
Source: Direct Democracy
