= Arbeiter-Schutzbund =

German anti-fascist paramilitary organization

- Leaders: Günter Klingenberg; Willi Godau
- Founded: 15 March 1931
- Dates active: March 15, 1931–September 10, 1932
- Dissolved: 10 September 1932
- Country: Free City of Danzig
- Allegiance: Social Democratic Party of the Free City of Danzig
- Ideology: Anti-fascism; Social democracy
- Political position: Left-wing

The Arbeiter-Schutzbund ('Workers Defense Union') was an anti-fascist paramilitary organization in the Free City of Danzig in the early 1930s, being the paramilitary wing of the Social Democratic Party of the Free City of Danzig. The organization had some 4,500 members.

== Foundation ==
A branch of the Reichsbanner Schwarz-Rot-Gold had been formed in Danzig in 1924, but it had not been particularly active. Around the time of the 1930 Free City of Danzig parliamentary election, the Social Democratic Party decided to form a new paramilitary force on the basis of the old Reichsbanner unit, to defend themselves from attacks from the National Socialist movement.

The new Arbeiter-Schutzbund was formally announced on March 15, 1931, with a march through the city and a meeting held at the Markthalle. Some 2,000 persons took part in the inaugural rally, where young Social Democrats marched in uniform. The meeting was presided over by Volkstag deputy Eduard Schmidt.

== Organization ==
The Arbeiter-Schutzbund was built along the lines of the Reichsbanner Schwarz-Rot-Gold. Its leaders were the teacher Günter Klingenberg and the workers' sport organizer Willi Godau. The Arbeiter-Schutzbund organized physical defense of social democratic election meetings and rallies. The organization pledged to defend the status quo of the Free City. Occasionally the organization attended events outside of the Free City. In 1932 over 1,500 Arbeiter-Schutzbund members attended a Reichsbanner meeting in Stuhm (West Prussia).

== Struggle over the Free City ==
As an organization and by numbers, the Arbeiter-Schutzbund was weaker than its National Socialist counterparts (the Sturmabteilung and the Schutzstaffel). It functioned mainly as a defensive organization, and was unable to contain the wave of violence from the National Socialists, although their attacks were often repelled. There were constant harassment and provocations against the Social Democrats. Clashes usually took place between smaller groups of militants, but there were also organized attacks on party offices, bookstores and individuals from either side, and sometimes firearms were used. From mid-January to late April 1931 some 80 violent political clashes involving the National Socialists were registered in Danzig, with some 120 people wounded and four killed. Bystanders and police officers were often wounded as well. Confrontations would eventually spread outside Danzig proper to places such as Tiegenhof, Käsemark, Stuhm, Praust, Ober Kahlbude and Meisterswalde.

=== Bloody Sunday ===
Fights would usually take place on Sundays. The most emblematic events took place on April 10, 1931 (at der Ostbahn in Orunia) and on June 21, 1931, in Rechtstadt. The June 21 clashes were dubbed as 'Bloody Sunday'. The Arbeiter-Schutzbund organized a sporting event, which included a relay race from Oliva to the Kampfbahn Niederstadt. They formed a protective line along the route to defend the race against attacks and provocations. Still, the event was attacked by the National Socialists, including cadres that had come from East Prussia. There were reports of 16 severe injured and 25 light injuries.

=== Ober Kahlbude attack ===
On November 15, an SA unit attacked a Social Democratic meeting in the village of Ober Kahlbude. However, the attackers were intercepted by a larger contingent of Arbeiter-Schutzbund militants from Orunia, and Horst Hoffmann, 16-year-old SA member, was killed in the clash. Following this, Hoffmann was declared a martyr by the National Socialist movement. Following his death, the Senate of the Free City of Danzig declared the Arbeiter-Schutzbund banned in December 1931.

=== Iron Front ===
When the Iron Front paramilitary organization to fight against National Socialism was announced on December 16, 1931, the Danzig Social Democrats delayed its implementation in the Free City. Whilst the Reichsbanner Council had called on the Iron Front to be functional across the Weimar Republic by February 21, 1932, it only took shape in the Free City by September 10, 1932.

== Symbols ==
The flag of the Arbeiter-Schutzbund was a red banner with a blue canton which had a jagged "S" symbol. The uniform worn by its members consisted of a windbreaker jacket with belt and a blue peaked cap.

== See also ==
- Republikanischer Schutzbund
- Socialist Action (Poland)
