= German Social Party =

The German Social Party may refer to:

- German Social Party (German Empire)
- German Social Party (Weimar Republic)
