= 1920 Free City of Danzig Constituent Assembly election =

Election in the Free City of Danzig

1920 Free City of Danzig Constituent Assembly Election
- 16 May 1920

All 120 seats in the Constituent Assembly 61 seats needed for a majority
- Registered: 219,149
- Turnout: 153,234, 70%
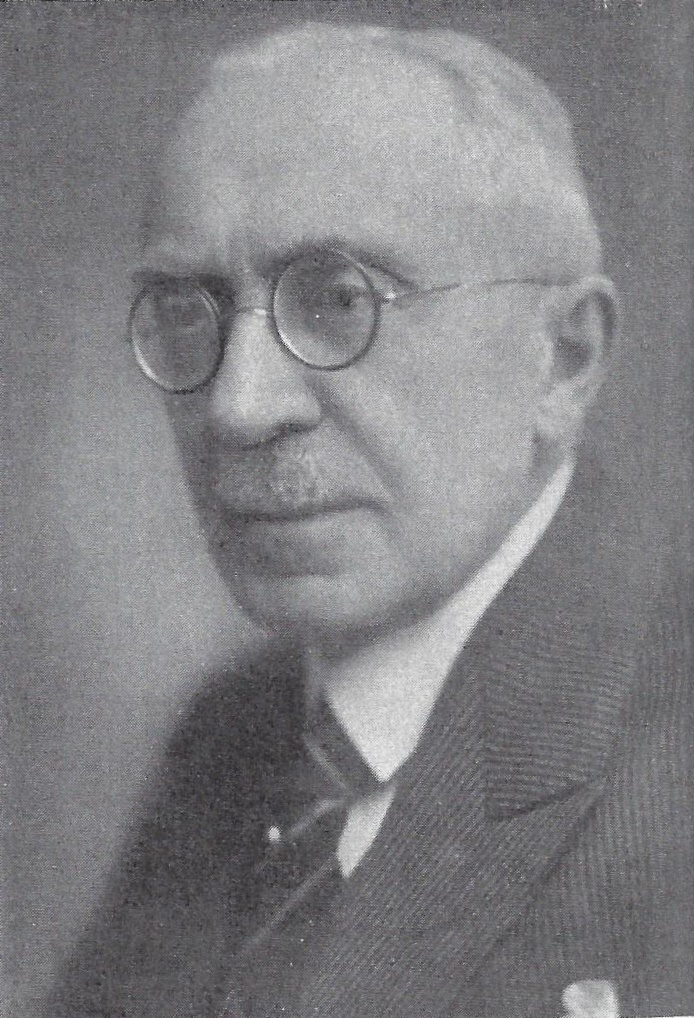

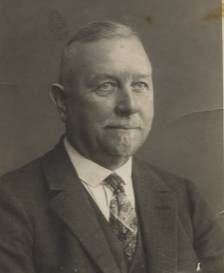

	First party	Second party	Third party
		USPD
Leader	Ernst Ziehm	Arthur Raube	Julius Gehl
Party	DNVP	USPD	SPD
Seats won	34	21	19
Popular vote	43,206	26,734	24,409
Percentage	28.2%	17.5%	15.9%
	Fourth party	Fifth party	Sixth party
Leader	Anton Sawatzki	Ludwig Noe	Hermann Strunk
Party	Z	FWV	DDP
Seats won	17	12	10
Popular vote	21,262	14,878	9,321
Percentage	13.9%	9.7%	8.8%
President of the Senate before election
Office established
Elected President of the Senate
Heinrich Sahm
DNVP–DDP–FWV

The first Constituent Assembly for the newly independent Free City of Danzig were held on the 16th May 1920. The German National People's Party emerged as the largest party, receiving 28% of the vote and winning 34 of the 120 seats in the Volkstag. Voter turnout was 70%.

The election served as the successor to both the 1919 German federal election, the last time that Danzig voted in a nationwide German election, and the 1919 Danzig Local Election, which was the final election of any kind conducted in Danzig under German sovereignty. Just over a month later, on 10 January 1920, the Treaty of Versailles formally came into effect, ceding Danzig from Germany to create the Free City.

== Results ==

Party	Votes	%	Seats
German National People's Party	43,206	28.20	34
Independent Social Democratic Party	26,734	17.45	21
Social Democratic Party	24,409	15.93	19
Centre Party	21,262	13.88	17
Free Economic Association	14,878	9.71	12
German Democratic Party	13,424	8.76	10
Polish Party	9,321	6.08	7
Total	153,234	100.00	120
Valid votes	153,234	99.83	
Invalid/blank votes	254	0.17	
Total votes	153,488	100.00	
Registered voters/turnout	219,149	70.04	
Source: Gonschior.de
