= Anton Plenikowski =

German politician (1899–1971)

Head of the Office of the Council of Ministers
- In office May 1956 – November 1963
- Chairman: Otto Grotewohl
- Preceded by: Rudi Geyer
- Succeeded by: Rudolf Rost

Head of the State Administration Department of the Central Committee
- In office 3 June 1950 – November 1954
- Secretary: Walter Ulbricht
- Deputy: Willi Barth
- Preceded by: Position established
- Succeeded by: Klaus Sorgenicht
Parliamentary constituencies
Member of the Volkskammer
In office 21 February 1950 – 14 July 1967
Preceded by	Paul Bismark
Succeeded by	Multi-member district
Member of the Volkstag
In office 11 January 1928 – 7 October 1937
Preceded by	Multi-member district
Succeeded by	Constituency abolished

Personal details
- Born: 19 January 1899 Zoppot, West Prussia, Kingdom of Prussia, German Empire (now Sopot, Poland)
- Died: 3 March 1971 (aged 72) East Berlin, East Germany
- Party: Socialist Unity Party of Germany (1946–1971)
- Other political affiliations: Communist Party of Germany (1927–1946); Social Democratic Party of the Free City of Danzig (1926–1927)
- Occupation: Politician; Party Functionary; Civil Servant; Teacher
- Central institution membership: 1954–1967: Candidate member, Central Committee; Other offices held: 1954–1956: Deputy Head, Office of the Council of Ministers; 1946–1950: Head, State Police and Interior Department of the Central Committee

Anton Plenikowski (19 November 1899 – 3 March 1971) was a German communist politician of the Free City of Danzig and East Germany.

== Biography ==
Plenikowski was born in Zoppot, then a German town on the country's Baltic Sea coast. He served in the German Army in World War I and became a member of the Soldier's and Workers' council of Breslau in 1918. After the war he worked as a teacher in Zoppot. He was a member of the municipal council of Liessau (1925–28) and the district assembly of Landkreis Großer Werder (1926–1930). In 1926 he joined the Social Democratic Party of the Free City of Danzig and the Communist Party in 1927. He represented the Communist Party in the Volkstag parliament in 1928-1937, at times as leader of the Communist group in it. He was dismissed from public service in 1933. After the ban on the Communist Party on 28 May 1934 by the Nazi Government of the Free City of Danzig, it continued to run in the 1935 Volkstag elections as "List Plenikowski".

In 1937 he emigrated to Sweden. In 1940-1941 he was detained at the Smedsbo prison camp. After his release, he settled down in Uppsala. From 1943 onwards he was involved in the Stockholm branch of the KPD. Plenikowski returned to Germany in 1946. He joined the Socialist Unity Party of Germany (SED) and worked in various positions in the SED administration. Plenikowski was a member of the Volkskammer in 1950-1967, candidate to the Central Committee of the SED (1954–1967) and head of the office of the council of ministers (1956–1963).

Plenikowski died in the East Berlin.
