= Conversations with Hitler =

Literary work by Hermann Rauschning

- Cover of the 1939 French edition
- Author: Hermann Rauschning
- Original title: Hitler m'a dit
- Language: French
- Publication date: 1939
- Publication place: France

Hitler m'a dit (German: Gespräche mit Hitler), translated as The Voice of Destruction in American title, and Hitler Speaks in British title, was a controversial book written by German politician and anti-Hitler activist Hermann Rauschning that claims to record the author's conversations with Adolf Hitler between 1932 and 1934.

== Publication history ==
It was published in 1939 in France under the title Hitler m'a dit by Coopération. At the beginning of the war, the French dropped leaflets on the Western Front containing excerpts from Rauschning's writings but with little response.

The book was translated into English and published in 1939 in the United Kingdom by Thornton Butterworth, under the title Hitler Speaks. It was released in the United States in 1940 as The Voice of Destruction by Putnam.

== Contents ==
The book claimed to be based on actual discussions with Hitler, though they were probably entirely Rauschning's invention.

== Influence and legacy ==
Despite the initial doubt over its authenticity, the work won great popularity and its inaccuracies had not been widely known until the 1980s.

The work was widely cited by many scholars, such as Hannah Arendt in her The Origins of Totalitarianism and Richard Pipes in his Russia Under the Bolshevik Regime.

It was influential in its suggestion that Hitler was possessed by demons. This influenced a later genre of literature which promoted a variety of spurious occult theories about Nazism and occultism, many of which quoted heavily from the work.

== See also ==
- Hitler Diaries, another falsified work about Adolf Hitler
