= Das freie Volk =

German-language newspaper in Danzig (1918–1921)

- Founded: December 1918
- Ceased publication: 1921
- Political alignment: USPD (1918–1921), KPD (1921)
- Language: German
- Headquarters: Danzig

Das freie Volk ('The Free People') was a daily newspaper published from Danzig between December 1918 and 1921. The newspaper was the organ of the Independent Social Democratic Party of Germany in West and East Prussia. In 1921 it became the organ of the Danzig district of the Communist Party of Germany. The Communist Party later started a new newspaper, Danziger Arbeiterzeitung.
