= Ernst Ziehm =

German politician

Dr. Ernst Bruno Victor Ziehm
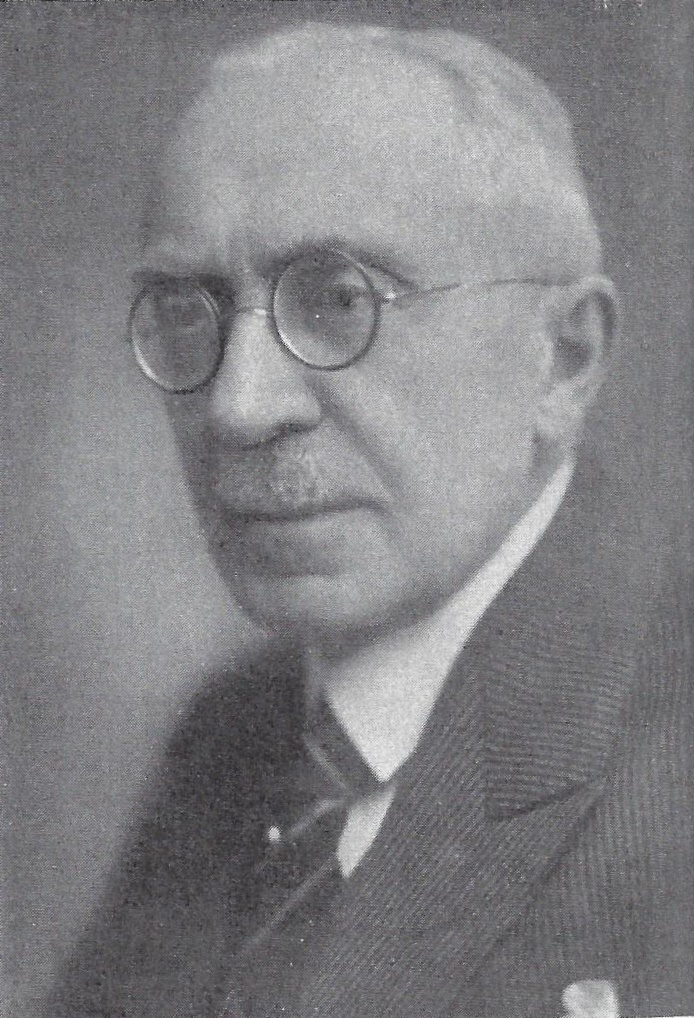
- Ernst Ziehm

2nd President of the Free City of Danzig Senate
- In office 10 January 1931 – 20 June 1933
- Preceded by: Heinrich Sahm
- Succeeded by: Hermann Rauschning

Personal details
- Born: 1 May 1867 Damerau, Province of Prussia, Kingdom of Prussia, now Dąbrowa Chełmińska, Poland
- Died: 7 July 1962 (aged 95) Lübeck, Federal Republic of Germany
- Party: German National People's Party
- Profession: Jurist/politician

Dr. Ernst Ziehm (1 May 1867 – 7 July 1962) was a Danzig-based German politician from the conservative German National People's Party and President of the Senate of the Free City of Danzig from 1931 to 1933. Born in Damerau, West Prussia, Ziehm studied jurisprudence and judicial Intern in Strasbourg and Marienweder from 1905 to 1914. Then he became judicial official in Oppeln. In 1914, he became an administrator in Danzig. From 1931 to 1933 he served as President of the Senate of the Free City of Danzig (Head of State). After 1933, he was replaced by Hermann Rauschning, as Nazis seized control over the city-state's government. Ziehm died in Lübeck in 1962.

== Life ==
After graduating from high school in 1887, Ziehm began studying law and political science at the Eberhard Karls University of Tübingen. He joined the Corps Suevia Tübingen student corps in October 1888, but left on the 27th of November, 1889. Inactivated in Easter 1890, he moved to the University of Leipzig. In the same year he joined the Corps Misnia Leipzig, another student corps, there. Until his death, he was the oldest living member of the corps. As an inactive student, he finally went to Friedrich Wilhelm University. After his first state examination in West Prussia, he became a trainee in Strasburg in West Prussia and Marienwerder. In 1892 he received his Doctorate of Law in Leipzig.

After his assessor's examination in 1896, he went abroad on leave in 1897. In 1898, he went to the Provincial Administration West Prussia in Danzig. Starting in 1899, he became a magistrate in Strasburg (Uckermark), he was transferred in 1900 to the Higher Regional Court of Marienwerder. From 1905 to 1914, he was a government councillor in the government of Opole in Upper Silesia. In 1914 he was appointed administrative Court Director in Danzig. Until 1920, he was also Deputy Prime Minister. After giving up his judicial office, he joined the Danzig DNVP in 1920 and participated in the Volkstag, and until 1925, he was the Deputy Senate President (Head of Government). From 1922 to 1930 he also served as President of the Higher Administrative Court of Danzig. He was instrumental in the preparation of the Constitution guaranteed by the League of Nations for the Free City of Danzig.

When the Senate President Heinrich Sahm could no longer form a new coalition, Ziehm took over his position in 1931. The Ziehm Senate, a coalition cabinet split between the German Center Party and the DNVP, was tolerated in the Volkstag by the NSDAP. In the summer after the victory of the NSDAP in parliamentary elections in March 1933, Ziehm was forced to resign. He was replaced by Hermann Rauschning. Ziehm retired from politics.

Ziem married Olga, née Hardt, whom he had one son, named Günther (* 1902) and one daughter, named Wiltrud (* 1910). He died in 1962 in Lübeck.

== Works ==
- Danzig, ein Problem der europäischen Politik. Danzig 1932.
- Aus meiner politischen Arbeit in Danzig 1914–1939 (Autobiografie). J. G. Herder-Institut, Marburg 1956, 1960.
