= Bruno Kurowski =

German politician (1879-1944)

Bruno Kurowski (12 January 1879 – 1944) was a German lawyer and politician of the Free City of Danzig.

== Biography ==
Kurowski was born in Marienburg, West Prussia, and studied law at the University of Königsberg. He and his wife Aenne Kurowski-Schmitz practised a lawyer's and notary's office in Danzig (today Gdańsk).

In January 1919, Kurowski was elected as a member of the Centre Party to the Weimar National Assembly for the Danzig constituency but had to withdraw after the foundation of the Free City of Danzig.

He became the Chairman of the Danzig branch of the Catholic Centre Party, which he represented as a fraction leader in the Volkstag parliament, and became a Senator in 1926.

Kurowski was a consul general and an honorary consul of the Federal State of Austria, a post for which he was charged with High treason in 1937 by the Nazi government of the Free City. The trial was stopped and Kurowski was released from prison after the Centre Party refused to protest against its "voluntary" dissolution to the League of Nations.

While his wife remained in Danzig, Kurowski moved to Austria and, after the Anschluss, to Italy. He returned to Germany and lived at St. Tönis, the birthplace of his wife, but was again arrested. After a further release, he was hidden at the Sisters of Saint Elizabeth in Danzig-Oliva and died in a hospital in Danzig.
