= Communist Party (Free City of Danzig) =

Political party in the Free City of Danzig

The Communist Party in Danzig (present-day Gdańsk) was initially founded as a subdivision of the East Prussian section (bezirk) of the KPD. In 1921 a separate party branch of the KPD in the Free City of Danzig was set up. While the Party did not run in the first elections of 1920, twelve members of the USPD in the Volkstag joined the Communist Party on 28 January 1921 (seven of them joining the Social Democratic Party of the Free City of Danzig in June 1923). In the following elections the Party ran with varying success.

In early 1930s, the Communist Party had around 800 members.

The KPD East Prussia-Free City of Danzig organization (bezirk) published the daily newspaper Die rote Fahne des Ostens. The KPD Danzig published Das freie Volk and Danziger Arbeiterzeitung.

The Communist Party was banned in the Free City of Danzig on 28 May 1934 by the Nazi Government but continued to run in the 1935 Volkstag elections as "list Plenikowski".

== Election results ==
Year	Votes	%	Seats	% of Seats
1923	14,982	9.09	11	9.17
1927	11,700	6.40	8	6.67
1930	20,194	10.21	7	9.72
1933	14,566	6.80	5	6.94
1935	7,916	3.37	2	2.78
