= 1933 Free City of Danzig parliamentary election =

Election

- 28 May 1933
- All 72 members of the Volkstag
- Turnout: 92.09%
Party	Leader	Vote %	Seats	+/–
NSDAP	Albert Forster	50.12	38	+26
SPFSD	Arthur Brill	17.69	13	−6
Centre		14.63	10	−1
KP		6.80	5	−2
DNVP		6.35	4	−6
Poles		2.04	1	−1
DMPL		1.11	1	New
This lists parties that won seats. See the complete results below.
Senate President before	Senate President after
Ernst Ziehm; DNVP	Hermann Rauschning; NSDAP

Parliamentary elections were held in the Free City of Danzig on 28 May 1933. The Nazi Party emerged as the largest party, receiving 50% of the vote and winning 38 of the 72 seats in the Volkstag, the first time any party had won a majority of seats in the legislature. Voter turnout was 92%.

The elections were held under violent circumstances, with the Nazis attacking the electoral events of the opposition. The campaign was heavily influenced by the Great Depression as well as the Nazi seizure of power in Germany. After the victory, the Nazis enacted dictatorial measures that violated the constitution. The next election would be held under mass repression and fraud, making the 1933 election the last with a free choice.

== Results ==
Party	Votes	%	Seats	+/–
Nazi Party	107,331	50.12	38	+26
Social Democratic Party	37,882	17.69	13	–6
Centre Party	31,336	14.63	10	–1
Communist Party	14,566	6.80	5	–2
German National People's Party	13,596	6.35	4	–6
Poles	4,358	2.04	1	–1
Dr Moczynski Polish List	2,385	1.11	1	New
Young Germans' Movement	1,698	0.79	0	New
German Danziger Houseowners' Party	976	0.46	0	New
Total	214,128	100.00	72	0
Valid votes	214,128	99.44		
Invalid/blank votes	1,213	0.56		
Total votes	215,341	100.00		
Registered voters/turnout	233,842	92.09		
Source: Gonschior.de
