= Hermann Rauschning =

German politician (1887–1982)

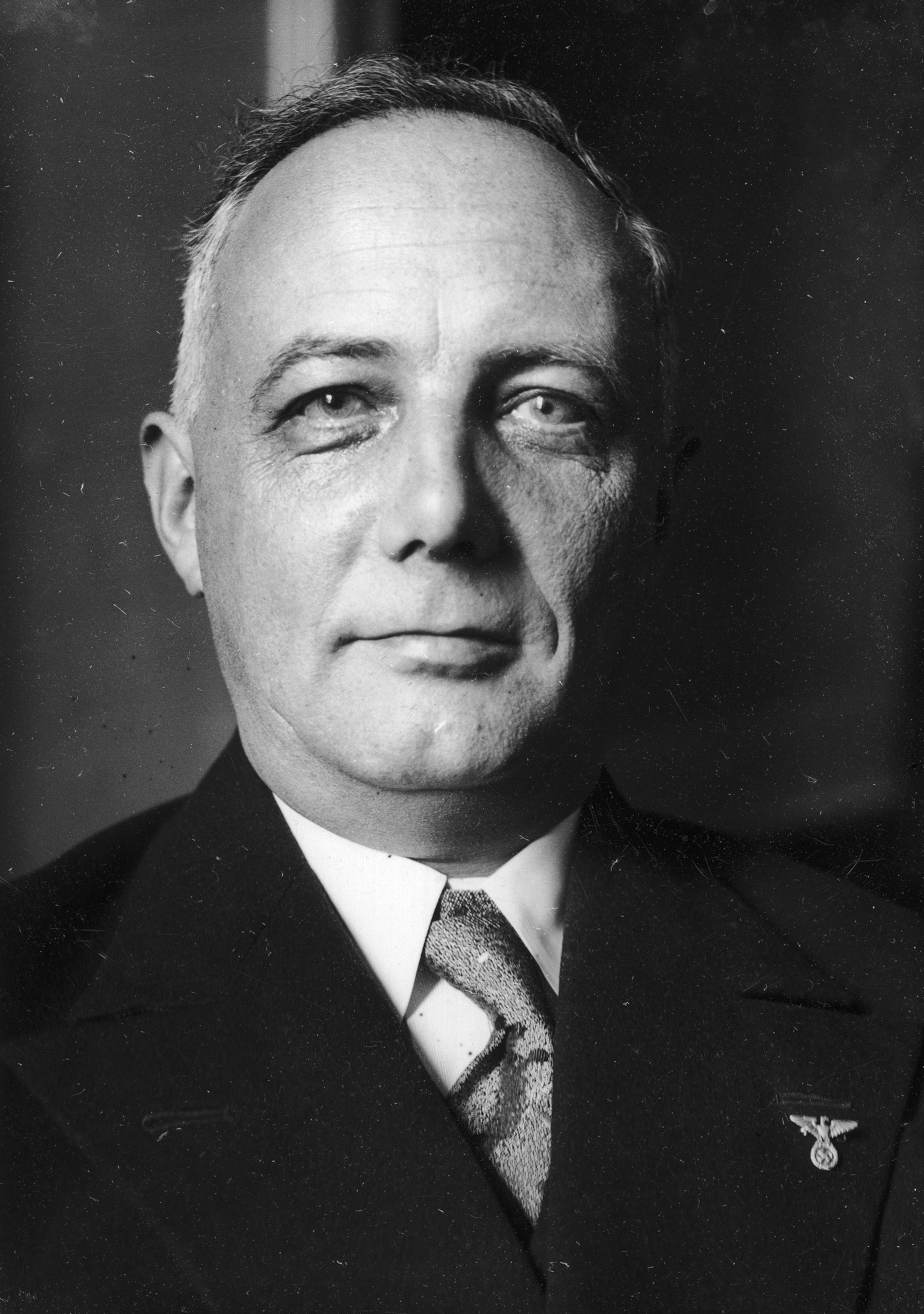
- Rauschning in 1933

3rd President of the Free City of Danzig Senate
- In office 20 June 1933 – 23 November 1934
- Preceded by: Ernst Ziehm
- Succeeded by: Arthur Greiser

Personal details
- Born: 7 August 1887 Thorn, Prussia, Germany (now Toruń, Poland)
- Died: 8 February 1982 (aged 94) Portland, Oregon, U.S.
- Party: Nazi Party (1932–1934)
- Military career
- Allegiance: German Empire
- Branch: Imperial German Army
- Rank: Lieutenant
- Conflicts: World War I

Hermann Adolf Reinhold Rauschning (7 August 1887 – 8 February 1982) was a German politician and author, adherent of the Conservative Revolution movement who briefly joined the Nazi movement before breaking with it. He was the President of the Senate (head of government and chief of state) of the Free City of Danzig from 1933 to 1934. In 1934, he renounced Nazi Party membership and in 1936 emigrated from Germany. He eventually settled in the United States and began openly denouncing Nazism. Rauschning is chiefly known for his book Gespräche mit Hitler ("Conversations with Hitler", American title: Voice of Destruction, British title: Hitler Speaks) in which he recalls meetings and conversations with Adolf Hitler.

== Early life ==
Rauschning was born in Thorn in the province of West Prussia (then part of the German Empire; now Toruń, Poland) to a Prussian Army officer. He attended the Prussian Cadet Corps institute at Potsdam and studied history, German philology and musicology at the Berlin University, where he obtained a Dr. phil. doctorate in 1911. He fought in World War I as a lieutenant and was wounded in action.

After the war, he stayed in Poznań, which (like Rauschning's home region of West Prussia) was ceded by Germany to Poland after the Treaty of Versailles in 1919. He was active in several organisations of the German minority and prominent in the Poznań historical society. Disagreeing with the leaders of the German minority in the Poznań Voivodeship, he moved to the Free City of Gdansk (which was under League of Nations mandate) in 1926, where he bought an estate in the village of Warnau (Warnowo) in the Vistula Fens and became a farmer.

== Political career ==
During the 1920s, Rauschning was close to the "Young Conservative" movement of Arthur Moeller van den Bruck and affiliated with the German National People's Party (DNVP) of Danzig. In 1932, he joined the Nazi Party as he believed it to offer the only way out of Germany's troubles, including the return of Danzig to Germany. In the 1930 Danzig parliamentary election, the Nazis had become the second-strongest force, replacing the DNVP, as they had discovered the electoral potential of the rural population in Danzig. Rauschning saw this as a powerful tool to reorganize the Danzig NSDAP. Rauschning became the agricultural advisor to the local Gau in January 1932 and in February of the same year, leader of the Danzig Agricultural League (Danziger Landbund), a movement that supported the taking over of the Senate by the Nazis. He also became chairman of the Danzig Teachers' Association in 1932.

The President of the Senate, Ernst Ziehm (DNVP) who ruled from 1931 to 1933, strongly disliked Rauschning. In Summer 1932, Rauschning and the local Gauleiter Albert Forster met with Adolf Hitler in Obersalzberg to discuss happenings in Danzig. After Hitler came to power in Germany in January 1933, the Nazis in Danzig withdrew their support for the Ziehm Senate and demanded the formation of a new government under the leadership of Hermann Rauschning. Ziehm refused to form a joint government with the Nazis, but he and his Senate resigned en bloc, triggering an early parliamentary election in May 1933. The NSDAP won this election with an absolute majority and Rauschning became the President of the Senate of Danzig on 20 June 1933, starting the Rauschning Senate which—except for the Senator of Justice—consisted exclusively of NSDAP members.

In foreign affairs, Rauschning did not conceal his personal desire to turn neighbouring Poland into a vassal state of Germany. As a conservative nationalist, Rauschning was not typical of Nazi members and the Nazis' violent antisemitism was alien to him. He was a bitter rival of Albert Forster, the future Gauleiter of Danzig.

There has been some debate over the importance of Rauschning to Hitler and the party. One of the reasons cited for Hitler's interest in Rauschning was his citizenship and political leadership in the Free City of Danzig. One of the first questions that Hitler asked Rauschning was "whether Danzig had an extradition agreement with Germany," which drew Hitler’s attention due to the possibility of him being forced to go underground. Hitler feared that the Weimar Republic might move against the party and ban it. Since Danzig retained an independent status under the League of Nations, Hitler apparently felt that the free port "might well offer a useful asylum."

== Fall from power ==
On 23 November 1934, he resigned from the Senate and the party. In the April 1935 Danzig elections, he supported "constitutionalist" candidates against the Nazis and wrote articles supporting co-operation with the Poles, which angered the Nazis. Rauschning found himself in personal danger.

He sold his farming interests and fled to Poland in 1936. He moved on to Switzerland in 1937, France in 1938 and the United Kingdom in 1939. Rauschning joined German émigrés; left-wing Germans opposed his right-wing views and the fact that as a member of the Nazi Party, he had been instrumental in the takeover of Danzig. Rauschning represented "one of the most conservative poles of the emigration" and enjoyed celebrity status through his lectures. He sought to play a leading role in the more conservative émigré German Freedom Party, run by Carl Spiecher, later of the Centre Party, but he fell out with Spiecher, who thought Rauschning was motivated by self-interest, rather than the interest of the party.

== Later life ==
Between 1938 and 1942, he wrote a number of works in German on the problem of the Nazis that were translated to a number of languages, including English. His Gespräche mit Hitler (Conversations with Hitler) was a huge bestseller but its credibility would later be severely criticised, and its standing as an accurate document on Hitler for historians was later questioned by the holocaust-denier Wolfgang Hänel and Ian Kershaw. However, as anti-Nazi propaganda it was taken seriously by the Nazi regime. At the beginning of the war, the French dropped leaflets on the Western Front containing excerpts from Rauschning's writings but with little response. Rauschning's ideas of conservative Christian resistance to Hitler met with increasing scepticism and were of no interest to Winston Churchill and his doctrine of uncompromising total war against the Nazis.

In 1941, Rauschning moved to the United States, becoming an American citizen in 1942 and purchasing a farm near Portland, Oregon, where he died in 1982. He remained politically active after the war and opposed the policies of Konrad Adenauer.

== Writings ==
In 1930, he published a work under the title Die Entdeutschung Westpreußens und Posens (The Degermanisation of West Prussia and Posen). According to Rauschning, Germans in those areas were constantly put under pressure to leave Poland.

Rauschning's writings that were translated into English deal with Nazism, the conservative revolutionaries' relation to it, and their role and responsibility for Hitler gaining power. By conservative revolution, Rauschning meant "the prewar monarchic-Christian revolt against modernity that made a devil's pact with Hitler during the Weimar period." Rauschning came "to the bitter conclusion that the Nazi regime represented anything other than the longed-for German revolution."

In Die Revolution des Nihilismus (The Revolution of Nihilism), he wrote that "the National Socialism that came to power in 1933 was no longer a nationalist but a revolutionary movement" and as the book's title states a nihilistic revolution that destroyed all values and traditions. He believed that the only alternative to Nazism was the restoration of the monarchy. His book went through 17 printings in the United States. The book was directed at conservatives in Nazi Germany, whom he hoped to warn of the alleged anti-Christian nature of the Nazi revolution. He would reiterate the anti-Christian nature of Nazism in Gespräche mit Hitler, where he has Hitler rule out that Jesus could have been Aryan. Given that Hitler held the exact opposite view, Rauschning's intention appears to have been "to put as much distance between Hitler and Christianity as possible". The main thesis of The Revolution of Nihilism that National Socialism was a nihilist pursuit of power with no ideological content is claimed to have unduly influenced Alan Bullock's portrayal of Hitler as a cynic in his 1952 Hitler: A Study in Tyranny, as well as that of Bullock's rival Hugh Trevor-Roper in The Last Days of Hitler (1947).

His success with the publication of his Die Revolution des Nihilismus book (The Revolution of Nihilism) in early 1938 made Rauschning financially able to pursue his German edition of Gespräche mit Hitler (Conversations with Hitler) and the other early versions and translations in 1939 and 1940. The first edition of The Revolution of Nihilism was printed in German under a Zurich, Switzerland, publishing house (Europa), which was "rapidly followed by ever renewed editions." Its English translation was published in 1939 and became "the third best-seller on the non-fiction list."

At the Nuremberg Trials, the Soviet Union presented as evidence (USSR-378) two extracts from The Voice of Destruction. Horst Pelckmann, for the defence, asked for Rauschning to be called as a witness on the matter of the party programme relating to the solution of the Jewish question and Hitler's "principle to deceive the Germans about his true intentions" so that the prosecution would have to prove that the SS "knew what Hitler actually wanted," but Rauschning was not called.

== Authenticity of Hitler Speaks ==
It should be noted at the top of this discussion that Rauschning—after a sustained campaign prosecution and defamation by 'scholars' in the cottage industry of Holocaust denial—has reentered the domain of sources approved by mainstream scholarship in the history of the period. Richard J Evans, who criticized Rauschning (along with his peer Ian Kershaw) as recently as 2018, began to cite from Rauschning again in his most recent work, Hitler’s People in 2024. He rejoins other mainline historians and biographers of the Third Reich, such as Hugh Trevor-Roper and Joachim Fest, in considering Rauschning an important source on this period and as a source-witness on the subject of the figure he is best remembered for describing, Adolf Hitler.

Controversy

The authenticity of the discussions that Rauschning claimed to have had with Hitler between 1932 and 1934, which formed the basis of his book Hitler Speaks, was challenged shortly after Rauschning's death by an obscure Swiss researcher, Wolfgang Hänel—a holocaust-denier. Hänel investigated the memoir and announced his findings at a conference of the negationist association Zeitgeschichtliche Forschungsstelle Ingolstadt (ZFI) in 1983.

The ZFI is a historical revisionist association that, according to one of its leaders, Stephen E. Atkins, is a Holocaust denial institution that is based in Germany. Its conferences and meetings have speakers attempting to trivialize Nazism and denying the guilt for Nazi Germany's part in World War II and other culpable activities by Nazis, in close collaboration with periodicals such as Europa Vorn, Nation und Europa, and Deutschland in Geschichte und Gegenwart, who promoted similar viewpoints and goals. Not long after the ZFI conference in 1983 where Hänel’s critique of Rauschning was introduced, Mark Weber, from the Institute for Historical Review (IHR), considered the mainstay of the international Holocaust denial movement, published an article condemning the "Rauschning memoir as fraudulent," which led to the Holocaust denial and neo-Nazi community campaign to deny Rauschning's writings. As director of IHR, Mark Weber has referred to the Holocaust as a "hoax" and was the former news editor of National Vanguard, a neo-Nazi publication of the National Alliance.

The Hänel research was reviewed in the West German newspapers Der Spiegel and Die Zeit in 1985. By 2012, the scholarly consensus was that the conversations were not genuine. In an effort to undercut the accuracy of Rauschning's early account of Hitler's anti-Semitic diatribes to "remove millions of an inferior race that breeds like vermin," Weber wrote:

The Holocaust hoax is a religion. Its underpinnings in the realm of historical fact are nonexistent—no Hitler order, no plan, no budget, no gas chambers, no autopsies of gassed victims, no bones, no ashes, no skulls, no nothing.

As one of the first former Nazi insiders to criticize Hitler's plan for world domination and the expulsion of Jews, many of Rauschning's most sceptical adversaries have been led by "revisionist historians gathered around David Irving," who by 1988 was regarded as a proponent of Holocaust denial. In an unsuccessful 2000 libel case, Irving was discredited after he had falsified historical facts in an effort to advance his theory that the Holocaust never happened, where Judge Charles Gray concluded that Irving was "an active Holocaust denier; that he is anti-Semitic and racist and that he associates with right wing extremists who promote neo-Nazism."

The Encyclopedia of the Third Reich also considers that "the research of the Swiss educator Wolfgang Hänel has made it clear that the 'conversations' were mostly free inventions." In his biography of Hitler, Ian Kershaw wrote: "I have on no single occasion cited Hermann Rauschning's Hitler Speaks, a work now regarded to have so little authenticity that it is best to disregard it altogether."

Other historians have not been convinced by Hänel′s research. David Redles criticized Hänel′s method, which he said consisted of

point[ing] out similarities in phrasing of quotations from other individuals in Rauschning's other books... and those attributed to Hitler in The Voice of Destruction [i.e. Hitler Speaks]. If the two are even remotely similar Hänel concludes that the latter must be concoctions. However, the similarities, which are mostly slight, could be for a number of reasons.... [they] need not stem from Rauschning's attempt at forgery.

According to an article by The Spectator, Rauschning had taken immediate "notes made by him at the time" during his years with Hitler, which have been considered "not a mere transcript of the notes, but an attempt to reconstruct the conversations noted."

Although Rauschning had written his book more than six years after his conversations with Hitler, German historian Theodor Schieder remarked that it—

...is not a document in which one can expect to find... stenographic records of sentences or aphorisms spoken by Hitler, despite the fact that it might appear to meet that standard. It is a [work] in which objective and subjective components are mixed and in which alterations in the author's opinions about what he recounts become mingled with what he recounts. It is, however, a [source] of unquestioned value, since it contains views derived from immediate experience.

Historian Hugh Trevor-Roper's initial view that the conversations recorded in Hitler Speaks were authentic also wavered as a result of the Hänel research. For example, in the introductory essay he wrote for Hitler's Table Talk in 1953, he said:

"Hitler's own table talk in the crucial years of the Machtergreifung (1932–34), as briefly recorded by Hermann Rauschning, so startled the world (which could not even in 1939 credit him with either such ruthlessness or such ambitions) that it was for long regarded as spurious. It is now, I think, accepted. If any still doubt its genuineness, they will hardly do so after reading the volume now published. For here is the official, authentic record of Hitler's Table-Talk almost exactly ten years after the conversations recorded by Rauschning."

Trevor-Roper stated that Rauschning's account "has been vindicated by the evidence of Hitler's views which has been discovered since its publication and that it is an important source for any biography of Hitler."

In the third edition, published in 2000, he wrote a new preface in which he revised but did not reverse his opinion of the authenticity of Hitler Speaks:

"I would not now endorse so cheerfully the authority of Hermann Rauschning which has been dented by Wolfgang Hänel, but I would not reject it altogether. Rauschning may have yielded at times to journalistic temptations, but he had opportunities to record Hitler's conversations and the general tenor of his record too exactly foretells Hitler's later utterances to be dismissed as fabrication."

== Works ==
- Musikgeschichte Danzigs, (Dissertation University of Berlin) Berlin 1911
- Geschichte der Musik und Musikpflege in Danzig. Von den Anfängen bis zur Auflösung der Kirchenkapellen, Danzig 1931
- As editor: Posener Drucke, erster Druck: Nicolaus Coppernicus aus Thorn. Über die Umdrehungen der Himmelskörper. Aus seinen Schriften und Briefen Posen 1923
- Die Entdeutschung Westpreußens und Posens. Zehn Jahre polnische Politik, Berlin 1930. reprinted 1988 with the title Die Abwanderung der deutschen Bevölkerung aus Westpreußen und Posen 1919–1929.
- 10 Monate nationalsozialistische Regierung in Danzig, (speech) Danzig 1934
- Die Revolution des Nihilismus. Kulisse und Wirklichkeit im Dritten Reich, Zürich 1938 (US, The Revolution of Nihilism, Warning to the West, Alliance, 1939; UK, Germany's Revolution of Destruction, London 1939)
- Gespräche mit Hitler, Zürich 1940 (US, The Voice of Destruction, New York 1940; UK, Hitler Speaks: A Series of Political Conversations with Adolf Hitler on his Real Aims, London 1939; France, Hitler m′a dit; Dutch Hitlers eigen woorden(by Menno ter Braak and Max Nord))
- Die konservative Revolution : Versuch und Bruch mit Hitler New York, 1941 (US, The Conservative Revolution, Putnam, 1941; UK, Make and Break With the Nazis – Letters on a Conservative Revolution, Secker and Warburg, 1941)
- Men of Chaos, New York 1952
- Die Zeit des Deliriums, Zürich 1947 (US: Time of Delirium D. Appleton-Century, 1946)
- Deutschland zwischen West und Ost, Stuttgart 1950
- Ist Friede noch möglich? Die Verantwortung der Macht, Heidelberg 1953
- Masken und Metamorphosen des Nihilismus – Der Nihilismus des XX. Jahrhunderts, Frankfurt am Main / Wien 1954
- ...mitten ins Herz: über eine Politik ohne Angst (with H. Fleig, M. Boveri, J.A. v. Rantzau), Berlin 1954
- Die deutsche Einheit und der Weltfriede, Hamburg 1955
- Ruf über die Schwelle. Betrachtungen, Tübingen 1955
- Der saure Weg, Berlin 1958
- Mut zu einer neuen Politik, Berlin 1959

== Notes ==
Government offices
| Preceded by Ernst Ziehm | Danzig Head of State; 1933–1934 | Succeeded by Arthur Greiser |
