= Arthur Greiser =

German Nazi politician, Gauleiter, SS-Obergruppenführer (1897–1946)

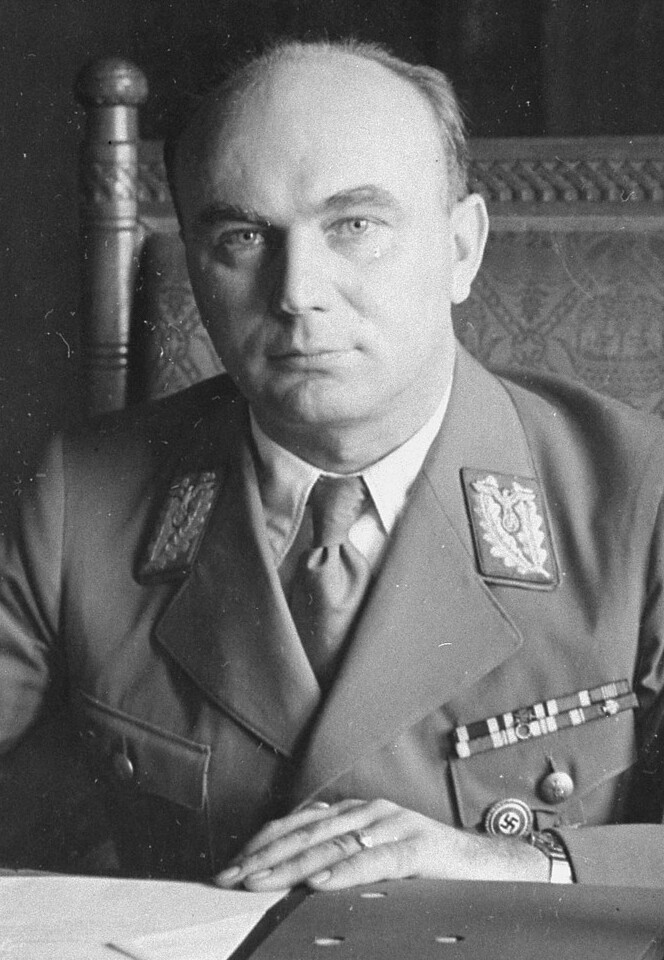
- Greiser c. 1939–1944

Reichsstatthalter of Wartheland
- In office 2 November 1939 – 8 May 1945
- Appointed by: Adolf Hitler
- Preceded by: Position established
- Succeeded by: Position abolished

Gauleiter of Wartheland
- In office 21 October 1939 – 8 May 1945
- Appointed by: Adolf Hitler
- Preceded by: Position established
- Succeeded by: Position abolished

President of the Free City of Danzig Senate
- In office 23 November 1934 – 23 August 1939
- Preceded by: Hermann Rauschning
- Succeeded by: Albert Forster (as Head of State)

Personal details
- Born: 22 January 1897 Schroda, Province of Posen Kingdom of Prussia, German Empire, now Środa Wielkopolska, Poland
- Died: 21 July 1946 (aged 49) Fort Winiary, Poznań, Republic of Poland
- Cause of death: Execution by hanging
- Party: NSDAP (#166635)
- Paramilitary service: SS (#10795)

Military service
- Rank: SS-Obergruppenführer

Arthur Karl Greiser (22 January 1897 – 21 July 1946) was a German Nazi Party politician, SS-Obergruppenführer, Gauleiter and Reichsstatthalter (Reich Governor) of the German-occupied territory of Wartheland. He was one of the persons primarily responsible for organizing the Holocaust in occupied Poland and numerous other crimes against humanity. He was arrested by the Americans in 1945, and was tried, convicted and executed by hanging in Poland in 1946 for his crimes, most notably genocide.

== Early life and career ==
Greiser was born in Schroda (Środa Wielkopolska), Province of Posen, Imperial Germany, the son of a minor local bailiff (Gerichtsvollzieher). He learned to speak Polish fluently during his childhood. In 1903, he enrolled in elementary school, which was followed by two years of intermediate school and finally the Königlich-Humanistisches Gymnasium (Royal Humanities Secondary School) in Hohensalza. He left the Gymnasium in 1914 without receiving a diploma, as in August that year he volunteered to join the Imperial German Navy. He served in the Kiel harbour naval forts at Korugen, Falckenstein, and in the fortress tower of Laboe from August 1914 to July 1915. He was then assigned as an artillery observer in Flanders as well as participating in minesweeping operations in Friedrichsort. In April 1917, Greiser volunteered for service in the Naval Flying Corps, where he initially served as an observer with SEE I and II and then with Küstenfliegerstaffel I and II. From August 1917 to August 1918, he was assigned as a naval aviator to Marine Schutzstaffel I. During this time, he was transferred to Seeflugstation Flandern II (Ostend) and he later flew with the Seefrontstaffel and MFJ IV. From December 1917 to January 1918, he was attached to the KE-Schule Langfuhr (near Danzig, now Gdańsk). Whilst posted to combat duty, he flew missions over the North Sea between the southern English and Belgian coasts. He was later shot down and wounded by gunfire. On 30 September 1919, he was classified as 50% war-disabled and discharged from naval service.

Greiser earned the Iron Cross (First and Second Class), the Honour Cross of the World War 1914/1918 and a Wound Badge in Black in 1914. From 1919 to May 1921, he served in the Freikorps Grenzschutz Ost and fought in the Baltic states.

== Joining the Nazi Party ==
According to historian Richard Evans, Greiser was fanatically anti-Christian, and an early member of the Nazi Party (NSDAP number 166,635). After many years with the nationalist Deutschsoziale Partei (DtSP) founded by Richard Kunze and membership in Der Stahlhelm in the mid-1920s, he joined the NSDAP and SA on 1 December 1929, and the SS on 29 September 1931.

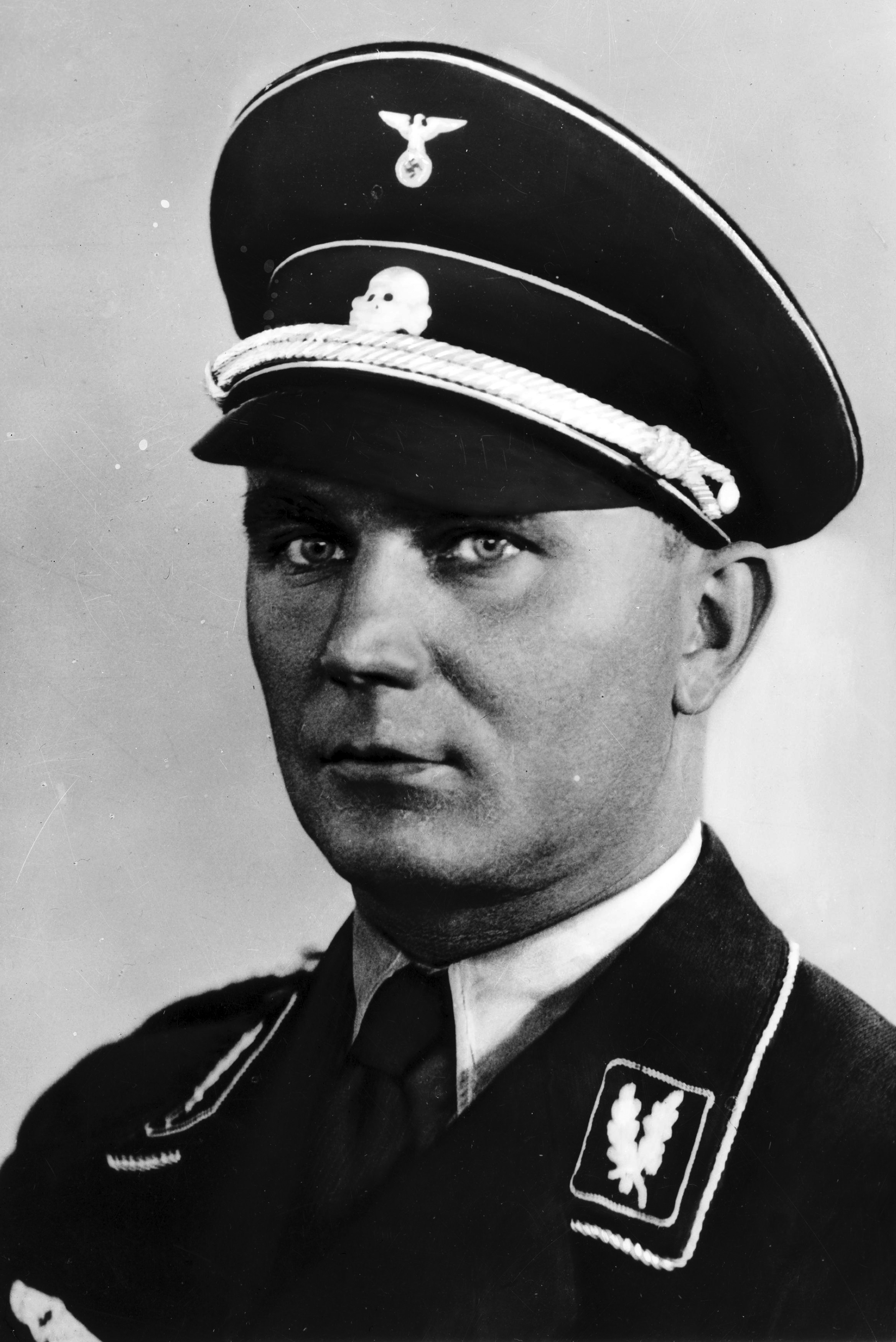
Greiser as SS-Oberführer in 1934

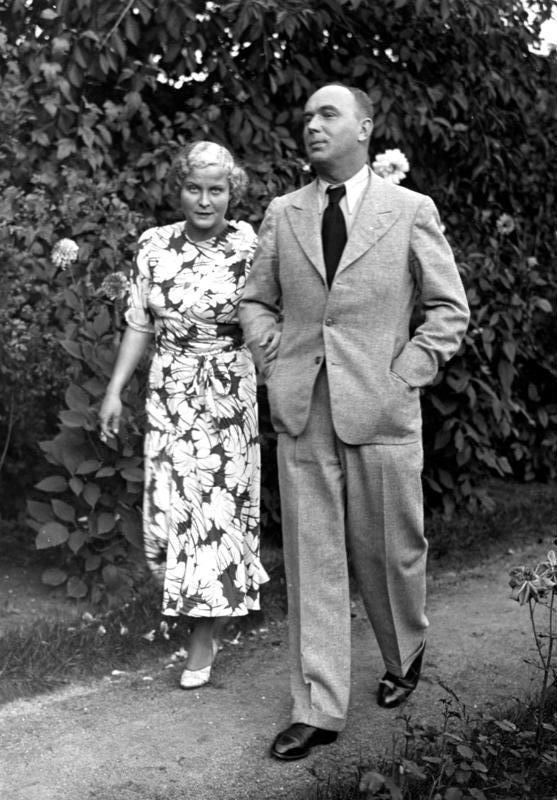
Greiser as Senate President in 1936 with his second wife, Maria Greiser-Koerfer

Greiser was the Deputy President of the Free City of Danzig from 1933 to 1934 in the Rauschning Senate, and was made Senate President (Senatspräsident) in 1935–1939. As Senate President of Danzig, he was a rival to his nominal superior Albert Forster, Gauleiter of the city since 1930. Greiser was part of the SS empire whilst Forster was closely aligned with the Nazi Party Mandarins Rudolf Hess and later Martin Bormann. On 23 August 1939 Forster replaced Greiser as Danzig's head of state. At that time, the media saw Forster as a radical and Greiser as a moderate.

Greiser was accused by Poland as being directly responsible for escalating tensions between the Free City and the Republic of Poland in 1939. When the Polish Foreign Affairs Minister Józef Beck announced economic reprisals following the harassment of Polish frontier guards and customs officers, Greiser on 29 July 1939 declared that the Danzig police no longer recognised their authority or power, and demanded their immediate withdrawal. The notice was so rudely worded that the Polish diplomatic representative to Danzig, Marian Chodacki, refused to forward it to Beck and instead sent a court summary.

== World War II ==
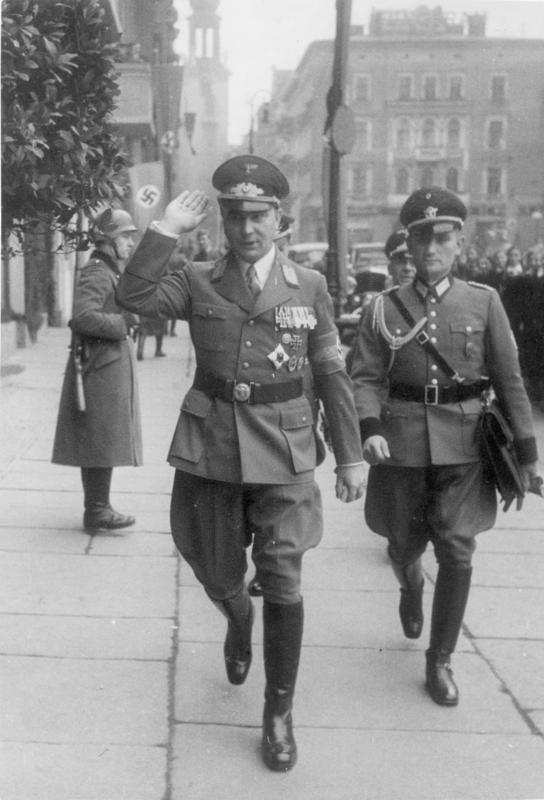
In occupied Poznań, 1939

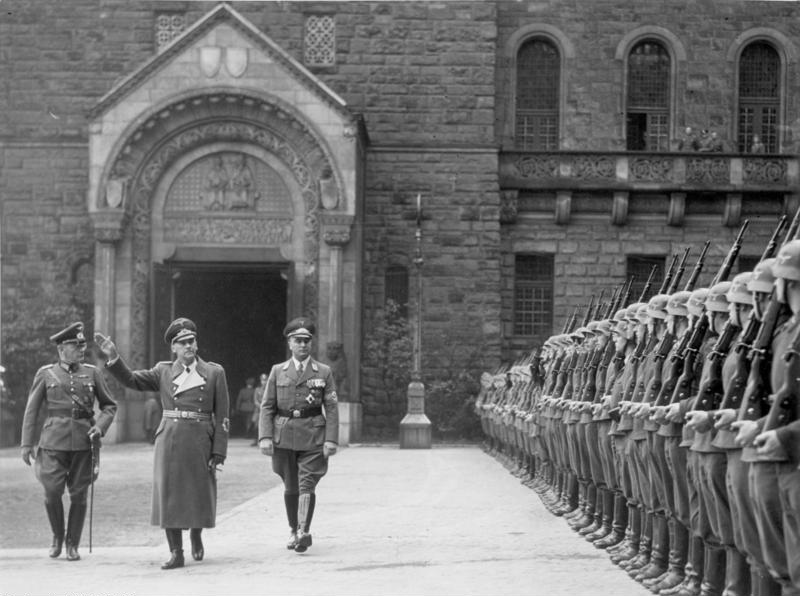
Reviewing the troops in Poznań, November 1939. Greiser is on the right with Wilhelm Frick (center) and Generalmajor Walter Petzel (left).

Immediately following the German invasion of Poland, Greiser was transferred from Danzig and on 8 September was appointed Chef der Zivilverwaltung im Militärbezirk Posen or Chief of Civil Administration in the military district of Posen, which was annexed to the German Reich on 8 October 1939. The military administration ended and he was then appointed Gauleiter of the newly created Reichsgau Posen on 21 October. At the same time he was named Reich Defense Commissioner of the newly established Wehrkreis XXI, consisting of the new Reichsgau. As the Head of the Civil Administration of the Poznań District, Greiser made intensive efforts to incorporate Łódź into the Reich. Additionally, he was appointed to the Prussian State Council. On 2 November, he was also named Reichsstatthalter (Reich Governor) of the new territory, thereby uniting under his control the highest party and governmental offices in his jurisdiction. On 29 January 1940, the region was renamed Reichsgau Wartheland. On 7 July 1940, Greiser was made a Reichstag deputy for the new territory. A member of several Nazi paramilitary organizations, Greiser was made a NSFK-Gruppenführer as well as a NSKK-Obergruppenführer in April 1940. Finally, on 30 January 1942, he was promoted to SS-Obergruppenführer.

The territory over which Greiser ruled was potentially very rich – the Prussian Imperial province of Posen had been the breadbasket of Wilhelmine Germany before 1914, possessed an excellent rail and road network, and a comparatively healthy and well educated workforce; Litzmanstadt (Łódź) had developed a fairly sophisticated industrial base during the 19th century. Although every Gauleiter was expected to fully Germanize his assigned area by any means, Greiser emphasized brutality to achieve this goal. He was an ardent racist who enthusiastically pursued an 'ethnic cleansing' program to rid the Warthegau of Poles and to resettle the 'cleansed' areas with ethnic Germans. This was along the lines of the racial theories espoused by Reichsführer-SS Heinrich Himmler. Mass expulsions of Poles from the Warthegau to the General Government and summary executions were the norm. A Polish servant in Greiser's house described him as "a powerfully built figure. He was a tall man, you could see his arrogance, his conceit. He was so vain, so full of himself—as if there was nothing above him, a god, almost. Everybody tried to get out of his way, people had to bow to him, salute him. And the Poles, he treated them with great contempt. For him the Poles were slaves, good for nothing but work". Greiser himself stated his beliefs: "If, in past times, other peoples enjoyed their century-long history by living well, and doing so by getting foreign peoples to work for them without compensating them accordingly and without meting out justice to them, then we too, as Germans want to learn from this history. No longer must we stand in the wings; on the contrary, we must altogether become a master race!".

In addition to mass deportation, Greiser's district was also at the forefront of "internal" racial cleansing according to Nazi ideals. His subordinate Wilhelm Koppe provided the 'Special Detachment (Sonderkommando) Lange' to the nearby Gau of East Prussia during May and June 1940. This SS squad gassed 1558 patients from mental asylums at the Soldau concentration camp and then returned to his region to continue this process.

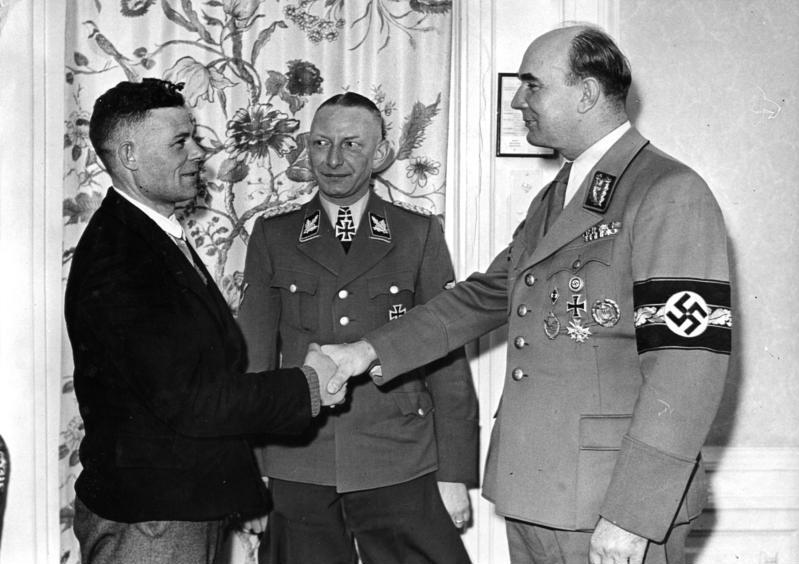
Arthur Greiser and Heinz Reinfarth in March 1944 welcoming the one-millionth Volksdeutscher resettled from East Europe to occupied Poland as part of the "Heim ins Reich" campaign.

Greiser was involved in the resettlement of German refugees from lands annexed to the Soviet Union in 1939 and 1940. Between October and December 1939, nearly 60,000 Volksdeutsche (ethnic Germans) arrived in Germany from the Baltic states of Estonia and Latvia. Evidently Wilfried Strik-Strikfeldt (later employed as translator for General Andrey Vlasov) was in this group, as he "resettled" in Posen. Neighbouring Gauleiter and rival Albert Forster refused them entry, and they were largely settled in properties seized from Poles in Poznań and across the Wartheland. However even Greiser was wary, noting that many were elderly and urbanized aristocrats with a strong class consciousness, not the virile peasant warrior types idolized by the SS. Closer to his heart were the over 100,000 ethnic Germans who were evacuated from Volhynia and eastern Galicia. These were mostly farmers and rural people, and, learning from the Baltic experience, Łódź in eastern Wartheland was designated the main Volksdeutsche Mittelstelle (VoMi) reception centre. In May 1940 a further 30,000 Volksdeutsche were relocated from the Nazi General Government of Poland to Greiser's domain. After 1941 a further 300,000 ethnic Germans were evacuated from Russia and Ukraine to Wartheland during the German invasion and occupation of the Soviet Union. Greiser's Poznań was considered the Germanised city par excellence, and on 3 August 1943 he hosted a national gathering of Gauleiter and senior Nazis, including Martin Bormann, Joseph Goebbels and Heinrich Himmler.

=== Anti-Church campaign ===
Richard J. Evans wrote that the Catholic Church was the institution that "more than any other had sustained Polish national identity over the centuries". The Nazi plan for Poland entailed the destruction of the Polish nation. This necessarily required attacking the Polish Church, particularly in those areas annexed to Germany. Greiser, with the encouragement of Reinhard Heydrich and Martin Bormann, launched a severe attack on the Catholic Church. He cut off support to the Church from the state and from outside influences such as the Vatican and Germany. In July 1940 he instituted Bormann's anti-church "thirteen point" measures in the territory. The anti-church measures, which had Hitler's approval, suggest how the Nazis aimed to «'de-church' German society».

Catholic Church properties and funds were confiscated, and lay organisations shut down. Evans wrote that "Numerous clergy, monks, diocesan administrators and officials of the Church were arrested, deported to the General Government, taken off to a concentration camp in the Reich, or simply shot. Altogether some 1700 Polish priests ended up at Dachau: half of them did not survive their imprisonment." Greiser's administrative chief August Jäger had earlier led the effort at Nazification of the Evangelical Church in Prussia. In Poland, he earned the nickname "Kirchenjäger" (Church Hunter) for the vehemence of his hostility to the Church. "By the end of 1941", wrote Evans, "the Polish Catholic Church had been effectively outlawed in the Wartheland. It was more or less Germanized in the other occupied territories, despite an encyclical issued by Pope Pius XII as early as 27 October 1939 protesting against this persecution."

=== Holocaust ===
SS-Obergruppenführer Greiser actively participated in the Holocaust. Early in 1940, Greiser is on record challenging Hermann Göring over efforts to delay the expulsion of Łódź Jews to Poland. On 18 September 1941, Reichsführer-SS Himmler informed Greiser that he intended to transfer 60,000 Czech and German Jews to the Łódź Ghetto until spring 1942, when they would be "resettled". The first transport arrived a few weeks later, and Greiser sought and received permission from Himmler to kill 100,000 Jews in his area. He then instructed HSSPF Wilhelm Koppe to manage the overcrowding. Koppe and SS-Sturmbannführer Herbert Lange proceeded to manage the problem by experimenting at a country estate at Chełmno nad Nerem with gas vans, establishing the first extermination unit which ultimately carried out the mass murder of approximately 150,000 Jews between late 1941 and April 1942. Furthermore, on 6 October 1943 Greiser hosted a national assembly of senior SS officers in Posen at which Himmler candidly spoke of the mass executions of civilians (the infamous Posen Speech). Greiser's mass murder operations were coordinated by SS-Oberführer Herbert Mehlhorn.

On 20 January 1945, Greiser ordered a general evacuation of Posen (having received a telegram from Bormann relaying Hitler's order to leave the city). Greiser left the city the same evening and reported to Himmler's personal train in Frankfurt an der Oder. There Greiser found that he had been tricked by Bormann. Hitler had announced that Posen must be held at all costs, and Greiser was now viewed as a deserter and coward, particularly by Goebbels, who in his diary on 2 March 1945 labeled Greiser "a real disgrace to the (Nazi) Party", but his recommendations for punishment after the capture of Poznań were ignored.

He surrendered to the Americans in Austria in 1945.

== Trial and execution ==
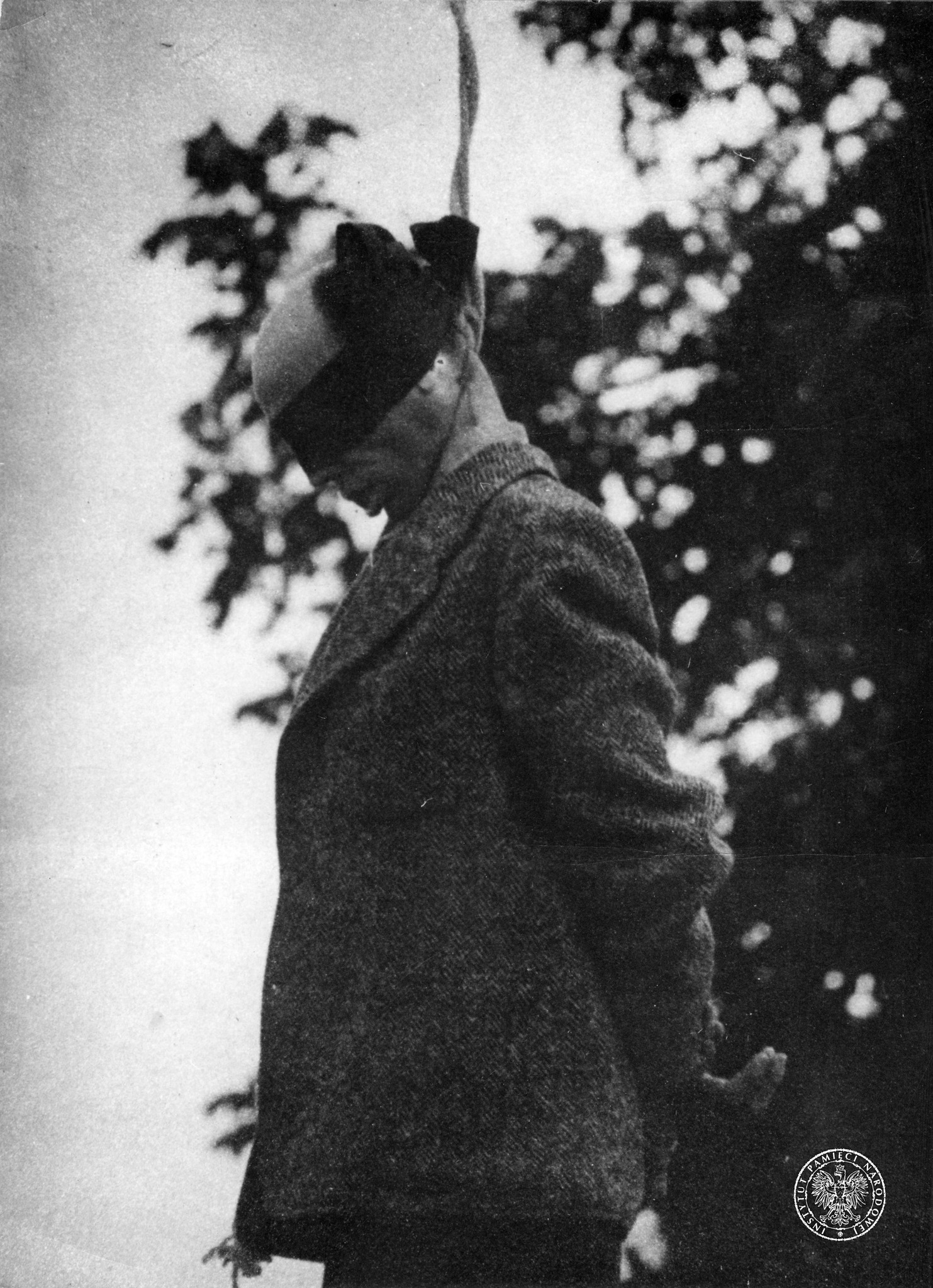
Execution of Arthur Greiser, Poznań, July 21, 1946.

After the war, the Polish government (the Supreme National Tribunal) tried Greiser for war crimes. His defence that he was only following orders did not hold up as it was shown that other Gauleiters had not followed a similar policy. For example, Albert Forster, Gauleiter of Danzig-West Prussia (the other German-annexed section of occupied Poland), simply declared all Poles in his area who were reasonably proficient in German to be Germans (although he was guilty of the elimination of the Jewish population under his jurisdiction either by murder or deportation). Greiser's advocates, Stanisław Hejmowski and Jan Kręglewski, tried to convince the Tribunal that Greiser, as a head of a formally independent state, the Free City of Danzig, could not be judged by another country, an argument rejected by the court. Greiser was convicted of the following:

- genocide and the murder of civilians and POWs;
- torture, persecution, and injuring civilians and POWs;
- organized and systematic destruction of Polish culture, plunder of Polish cultural heritage, Germanisation of the country and the Polish people, illegal appropriation of public property;
- organised and systematic looting of Polish property;
- insulting and deriding the Polish nation by propagating the idea of its cultural inferiority and low social worth;
- forcibly expelling individuals, families, neighbourhoods and whole districts to the General Government or forced labour camps in the German Reich;
- persecution and murder of Polish Jews by killing them in their places of residence, grouping them in closed ghettos from which they were sent to the Chelmno extermination camp for extermination in gas chambers, deriding the Jewish people in actions and words, causing physical suffering, injury and humiliation of human dignity;
- taking Polish children against the will of their parents or guardians, forcibly putting them in German families or public orphanages within the Reich while severing all contacts with their families and nation by giving them German names.

The Tribunal decided that Greiser was guilty of all charges and sentenced him to death by hanging, civil death, and confiscation of all his property. In the early morning of 21 July 1946 he was transported from prison to the slope of Fort Winiary where he was hanged before a large crowd, despite a plea from Pope Pius XII that his life be spared.

== See also ==
- List SS-Obergruppenführer
- Nazi persecution of the Catholic Church in Germany
- Nazi persecution of the Catholic Church in Poland
- Nazi crimes against ethnic Poles

Government offices
Preceded by Hermann Rauschning	Danzig Head of State; 1934–1939	Succeeded by Albert Forster
