= Julius Gehl =

German politician (1869–1945)

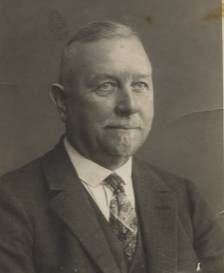
- Portrait of Julius Gehl

German National Assembly
- In office 1919–1919

Volkstag
- In office 1920–1939

President of the Volkstag
- In office 1923–1927
- In office 1930–1933

Personal details
- Born: 4 July 1869 Bromberg, Province of Posen
- Died: March 1945 Danzig
- Party: SPD; Social Democratic Party of the Free City of Danzig
- Occupation: masonry

Julius Gehl (4 July 1869, Bromberg, Province of Posen – March 1945, Danzig) was a German social democratic politician. Gehl served as the Chairman of the West Prussian District League of the Social Democratic Party of Germany (SPD). Gehl was a prominent leader of the Social Democratic Party of the Free City of Danzig during the interbellum years, serving as its chairman and parliamentary faction leader. Gehl also served as Vice President of the Senate of the Free City.

== Early life ==
Gehl was a masonry apprentice between 1884 and 1887. In until 1890 he was active in the masons' guild. Between 1900 and 1912 he was an official of the Free Association of German Masons.

== Political career in West Prussia ==
In 1912 he became a member of the District Secretariat of the SPD in West Prussia, and would serve as its chairman between 1912 and 1919. In 1915 he became a member of the Price Verification Agency in Danzig.

Gehl was editor of the newspaper Volkswacht, published from Danzig, between 1917 and 1918.

In 1919 Gehl was elected to the German National Assembly, having stood as an SPD candidate in the second electoral district (West Prussia).´

== Free City of Danzig ==
When the Free City of Danzig was formed, the Danzig branch of SPD reconstructed themselves as a separate party, the Social Democratic Party of the Free City of Danzig. Gehl was the party chairman 1919–1920. He then became the chairman of the parliamentary faction of the party. Gehl served as Vice President of the Senate of the Free City of Danzig from August 1925 to March 1931 and twice President of the Volkstag.

Gehl was the editor of the party organ Danziger Volksstimme.
