= Aenne Kurowski-Schmitz =

German lawyer and diplomat

Aenne Kurowski-Schmitz (born 26 March 1894 in St. Tönis in Krefeld; died 13 November 1968) was a German lawyer and diplomat. In 1914/15, she studied law at the Universities of Freiburg, Berlin and Bonn and in 1919, she received her doctorate in Bonn for Dr. Ing. jur. She became one of the first government commissioners in Germany, as an assistant to Walter Siemers and Kurt Peschke, Kurowski-Schmitz participated (1947 to 1948) at the criminal defense of Eduard Houdremont in the Krupp process.
