= Richard Kunze =

German politician (1872–1945)

- Born: 5 February 1872; Sagan, Kingdom of Prussia, German Empire
- Disappeared: May 1945 (age 73); Berlin
- Status: presumed dead
- Other name: Knüpple Kunze
- Occupation: Political organiser
- Years active: 1914–1945
- Known for: Antisemitic politician
- Title: Member of the Reichstag
- Term: 1924; 1933–1945
- Political party: German Conservative Party; Fatherland Party; Deutschvölkischer Schutz und Trutzbund; Deutschvölkischen Arbeitsring Berlin; German National People's Party; German Social Party; Nazi Party

Richard Kunze (5 February 1872 in Sagan – May 1945) was a German politician known for his antisemitism.

== Early years ==
Kunze's political career began around 1914 when the German Conservative Party employed him and fellow rightist Wilhelm Kube. Serving the party as general secretary, he earned 12,000 marks per month for a role primarily involving travelling in Germany, drumming up support. Near the end of the war, he became involved with the Fatherland Party, where he gained the nickname Knüppel-Kunze (Cudgel Kunze) because of strong attacks on the Jews.

== Post-war activity ==
After the war, Kunze was associated with the Deutschvölkischer Schutz und Trutzbund and in 1920, he joined with Reinhold Wulle and Arnold Ruge to form the Deutschvölkischen Arbeitsring Berlin, a short-lived successor group. The German National People's Party (DNVP) absorbed the group in June 1920, and Kunze joined the DNVP and became the party's chief publicist. However, Kunze split from the party in 1921, feeling that it did not match his own hard-line stance on the Jews.

== German Social Party ==
In 1921, Kunze established his antisemitic party in north Germany, known as the German Social Party, an early rival to the Nazi Party on the far-right. The new party rejected the monarchism of the DNVP, arguing that Jewish influence had been just as pronounced in the German empire as in the new Weimar Republic. In May 1924, Kunze was elected as a deputy to the Reichstag on the ticket from electoral constituency 3 (Potsdam II), until the October dissolution. The party became noted for provocative street activities, with Kunze becoming a well-known demagogue. However, support was lost as Kunze also gained a reputation for using the party to make money, diverting funds into his pockets. After several defections, he wound the party up in 1929.

== Nazism ==
In 1930, Kunze joined his old rivals as a member of the Nazi Party. Kunze was elected to the Preußischer Landtag as a Nazi delegate in 1932. In November 1933, he was elected to the Reichstag from his former constituency in Potsdam and, at the March 1936 election, he switched to represent constituency 5 (Frankfurt an der Oder). He continued to serve until 1945 in what had become a perfunctory institution by then.

Kunze was arrested after the Battle of Berlin, but went missing in May 1945 and was presumed dead.
