= 1927 Free City of Danzig parliamentary election =

Parliamentary elections were held in the Free City of Danzig on 13 November 1927. The Social Democratic Party emerged as the largest party, receiving 34% of the vote and winning 42 of the 120 seats in the Volkstag. Voter turnout was 85%.

== Results ==
Party	Votes	%	Seats	+/–
Social Democratic Party	61,779	33.79	42	New
German National People's Party	35,826	19.59	25	–8
Centre Party	26,096	14.27	18	+3
Communist Party	11,700	6.40	8	–3
National Liberal Citizens' Party	8,331	4.56	5	New
German Danziger People's Party	8,010	4.38	5	–1
German Liberal Party	6,204	3.39	4	New
Polish Party	5,764	3.15	3	–2
Bourgeois Working Alliance	4,227	2.31	3	New
Tenants and Creditors Party	3,577	1.96	2	New
Economy List	2,225	1.22	1	New
German Social Party	2,130	1.16	1	–6
Fishermen's Party	1,858	1.02	1	New
United List (NSDAP–VRP)	1,483	0.81	1	New
Danziger Homeowners' Party	1,392	0.76	1	New
German Middle Class and Workers' Party	1,005	0.55	0	New
Danziger Economy Bloc	583	0.32	0	New
General Pensioners' Party	578	0.32	0	New
Employee Group	68	0.04	0	New
Total	182,836	100.00	120	0
Valid votes	182,836	99.71		
Invalid/blank votes	527	0.29		
Total votes	183,363	100.00		
Registered voters/turnout	214,641	85.43		
Source: Gonschior.de
