= Judicial intern =

In the United States, a judicial intern (also commonly known as a "judicial extern" or "extern law clerk") is usually a law student or sometimes a recent law school graduate who provides assistance to a judge and/or law clerks in researching and writing issues before the court. Working as a judicial intern allows law students to gain practical legal experience and familiarity with the court operations.

== Description ==
Many judicial interns subsequently choose to work full-time as judicial law clerks immediately after graduation. These judicial "clerkships" generally last one year in which the law clerk works closely with the judge in assisting various matters before the court. Judicial clerkships tend to be a valuable experience to an attorney's career because of the work involved in both substantive and procedural issues. In many cases, a clerkship is a critical stepping stone into real practice. Most, if not all, major law firms pay "clerkship" bonuses to new associates who have completed a full one year clerkship term.

Among the most prestigious judicial internships are those in the federal court of appeals, federal district courts, and in the state's supreme court.

A judicial intern's selection process is similar to judicial clerkship positions. Grades, class ranking, and relevant extracurricular activities such as membership in the law school's law review or being a member of the law school's Moot Court Board are common criteria in selecting a judicial intern.

The American Bar Association Section of Litigation accepts judicial internship applications annually.
