= Gustav Pietsch =

German captain, resistance fighter, and politician

Gustav Pietsch (1893–1975) was a German captain, resistance fighter and Politician of the Free City of Danzig.

Pietsch was born in Bellin, Pomerania and served in the German Navy in World War I on a minesweeper and U-boat escort. He received his master's certificate and served in 1919/20 at the harbour of Danzig (today Gdańsk).

In 1918 he married Gertrude née Behnke from Glettkau (today Jelitkowo), where they settled. Glettkau lay on the soil of the Free City of Danzig and throughout the 1920s Pietsch worked as a captain on several cargo and fishing boats. He was a member of the German Merchant Navy Officer’s Association and the Association of Combat Veterans, closely affiliated to the German National People's Party (DNVP). His wife was active in the female section of the Combat Veteran’s Association.

In 1932 the Officer's Association en bloc joined the Nazi Party, which was opposed by Pietsch, who left the Association. In early 1933 the Nazis joined the government of the Free City and issued several antisemitic laws. Jews were dismissed from all public offices and the Combat Veterans were urged to do the same. In this situation Pietsch became the Chairman of the Danzig branch of the Association and vehemently opposed any discrimination of Jewish Veterans, which caused his first arrest. In 1935 he organized 150 non-Jewish Veterans to join a commemoration in the Synagogue of Danzig to protect the service against Nazi-attacks.

His actions led to a boycott of his business and in 1933 his wife opened a pastry shop in Oliva to secure the family's maintenance. The shop was however also boycotted and besmeared with antisemitic slogans. In 1935 the City's administration revoked the concession without further reasoning.

Pietsch himself meanwhile worked as an instructor at the nautical and fishery school Gordonia Mapilim of the Zionist association Zewulon in Gdynia. He instructed several hundred Jews from Poland and Danzig and organized the emigration of about 400 Jews to Palestine. In 1935 he founded a weekly newspaper Feldgrauer Alarm (Fieldgrey Alarm) and ran for the Volkstag elections as an independent candidate (list Freie Frontkämpfer), associated to the Liste Weise of former DNVP members. Pietsch was attacked several times by the Nazis and severely injured when he was pushed in front of a tramway. On 12 June 1936 the local Nazi SA stormed the general meeting of the DNVP while Pietsch held a speech, 60 persons were injured and Pietsch was again arrested. While the SA men were soon released, Pietsch was kept in prison for several weeks.

On 24 December 1938 Pietsch managed to leave Danzig and, supported by the Jewish Agency, emigrated to Palestine. He arrived on 10 January 1939 and founded the village of Neve Yam, where he continued to work as a nautical and fishery instructor. At the outbreak of World War II Pietsch was arrested by the British as an “enemy alien” but released again in February 1940.

In 1952 Pietsch became captain of the port of Eilat. In 1958 he returned to Germany and was honoured in 1961 by the Senate of Berlin as "Unbesungener Held" (unsung hero). Pietsch emigrated to Australia, where his daughter lived on a farm she had named "Glettkau", and died in 1975.
