= 1923 Free City of Danzig parliamentary election =

Parliamentary elections were held in the Free City of Danzig on 18 November 1923. The German National People's Party emerged as the largest party, receiving 27% of the vote and winning 33 of the 120 seats in the Volkstag. Voter turnout was 82%.

== Results ==
Party	Votes	%	Seats	+/–
German National People's Party	44,459	26.98	33	–1
Independent Social Democratic Party	39,755	24.12	30	+9
Centre Party	21,114	12.81	15	–2
Communist Party	14,982	9.09	11	New
German Party for Progress and the Economy	11,009	6.68	8	New
German Social Party	10,301	6.25	7	New
German Danziger People's Party	7,406	4.49	6	New
Polish Party	7,212	4.38	5	–2
Free Association of Officials, Employees and Workers	4,782	2.90	3	New
Association of Fishermen, Smokers, Small Businesses and Craftsmen	1,810	1.10	1	New
Tenants and Economic Party	1,686	1.02	1	New
National Christian Social Settlement Party	278	0.17	0	New
Total	164,794	100.00	120	0
Valid votes	164,794	99.69		
Invalid/blank votes	517	0.31		
Total votes	165,311	100.00		
Registered voters/turnout	202,599	81.60		
Source: Gonschior.de
