= German Social Party (Weimar Republic) =

German Social Party Deutschsoziale Partei
- Abbreviation: DtSP
- Leader: Richard Kunze
- Founded: 23 February 1921
- Dissolved: May 1929
- Split from: DNVP
- Newspaper: Deutsches Wochenblatt
- Ideology: Völkisch nationalism Antisemitism; Anti-capitalism; Anti-socialism
- Political position: Far-right

The German Social Party (German: Deutschsoziale Partei, DtSP) was an antisemitic and Völkisch political party in Germany and the Free City of Danzig during the Weimar Republic.

== History ==
The party was established on 23 February 1921 by Richard Kunze in order to compete with the German Socialist Party. Based in Berlin, by 1925 it had a membership of around 34,000; 3,000 in Berlin, 5,000 in Saxony, 2,400 in Middle Silesia, 2,300 in Posen-West Prussia and 5,000 in Danzig.

=== Germany ===
The party contested the Reichstag elections in Oppeln in 1922, a delayed part of the 1920 federal elections. It received 4.5% of the vote, failing to win a seat. In the May 1924 elections the party received 1.1% of the national vote, winning four seats. Kunze, Konrad Jenzen, Hans Kurth and Friedrich Stock became the party's MPs, although Kurth and Stock defected to the National Socialist Freedom Movement later in the year. The December 1924 elections saw the party ally with the Reichsbund für Aufwertung; its vote share fell to 0.5% and it lost all parliamentary representation.

In the 1928 elections the party's vote share fall to 0.15% as it remained seatless. The party was dissolved the following year, and Kunze joined the Nazi Party.

=== Free City of Danzig ===
The party ran in the 1923 elections, receiving 6% of the vote and winning seven seats in the 120-seat Volkstag. The 1927 elections saw the party's vote share fall to 1.2%, with it winning only one seat.
