= Arthur Brill =

Danzig politician (1883–1956)

Arthur Brill (22 January 1883 – 19 September 1956) was a politician in the Free City of Danzig. Brill was the chairman of the Social Democratic Party of the Free City of Danzig between 1920 and 1936. Brill represented Danzig in the executive of the Labour and Socialist International between January 1929 and 1936. Between July 1931 and 1934 he shared the seat with Johann Kowoll.
