= Social Democratic Party of the Free City of Danzig =

Social Democratic Party of the Free City of Danzig Sozialdemokratische Partei der Freien Stadt Danzig
- Chairman: Julius Gehl (1919–1920), Arthur Brill (1921–1936)
- Secretary: Johannes Mau
- Parliamentary faction leader: Julius Gehl
- Founded: 1919
- Banned: 1936
- Headquarters: Weißmönchenhintergasse 1/2, Danzig
- Newspaper: Danziger Volksstimme
- Youth wing: Arbeiterjugend
- Paramilitary wing: Arbeiter-Schutzbund
- Membership (1928): 5,418
- Ideology: Social democracy Democratic socialism
- Political position: Centre-left to left-wing
- International affiliation: Labour and Socialist International
- Volkstag seats: 30 (1923), 42 (1927), 19 (1930), 13 (1933), 12 (1935)

The Social Democratic Party of the Free City of Danzig (German: Sozialdemokratische Partei der Freien Stadt Danzig) was a political party in the Free City of Danzig. After the creation of the Free City of Danzig in 1919, the Danzig branch of the Social Democratic Party of Germany (SPD) separated itself from the party, and created the Social Democratic Party of the Free City of Danzig. The new party did however maintain close links with the SPD, and its political orientation (for example its anti-Soviet/anti-communist approach) was largely the same as that of the SPD.

The party participated in coalition government together with bourgeois parties between August 1925 and October 1926, and again between January 1928 and August 1930.

== Organization and leadership ==
The party organization was modelled after that of SPD. The highest organ of the party was the Party Congress (Parteitag), which was generally held in April every year. The Party Congress elected a Party Presidium and a Control Commission. Party activists were organized in local branch units, which were member organizations of the party. As of the late 1920s, the party claimed a membership of 5,418, out of whom 950 were women.

Julius Gehl was the chairman of the party 1919–1920, after which he became leader of the parliamentary group of the party. Arthur Brill was chairman of the party 1921–1936. Johannes Mau was the secretary of the party.

The party was active in the Danzig trade union movement (which was nominally independent, but was heavily influenced by the party). Arbeiterjugendbund ('Workers Youth League'), with around 450 members, was the youth wing of the party.

== Press ==
The party published the daily newspaper Danziger Volksstimme ('Danzig People's Voice').

== International affiliation ==
The party was a member of the Labour and Socialist International 1923 to 1936. Arthur Brill was a member of the Executive of the International between January 1929 and 1936 (he shared his seat with Johann Kowoll of the German Socialist Labour Party of Poland between July 1931 and 1934).

== Rise of Nazism ==
In late 1930 a new right-wing government was formed in the Free City, with support from the National Socialists (Nazis). As an opposition party, the Social Democrats formed the Arbeiter-Schutzbund ('Worker Defense League') as its paramilitary force. Arbeiter-Schutzbund had around 4,500 members. However, the capacity of the Social Democratic Party to mobilize anti-fascist resistance was hindered by nationalistic tendencies within the very ranks of the party (for example, anti-Polish prejudices were widespread within the party).

On 5 May 1932 a Social Democrat member of the municipal council, Gruhn, was murdered by the leader of the SS district Neuteich (Nowy Staw), Rudzinski. The "Volksstimme" was banned the next day for a period of three-month because it reported about the murder. However, despite repeated banning, the Volksstimme became the leading voice of the opposition in Danzig and its number of copies grew from 20,000 in 1929 to up to 40,000 prior to its final ban in October 1936. On 2 November 1933, the paper released an article heavily critical of the dissolution of the Danzig police unions. The article cited the freedoms guaranteed by the constitution of Danzig, which it accused the Senate of violating. By order of the chief of Danzig police, Helmut Froböss, the paper's editor, Franz Adomeit, was to suspend all publications the next day, effective for two months. In response, editors Fritz Weber and Anton Fooken sent an appeal to League Commissioner Helmer Rosting and petitioned the Senate. The Senate dismissed the complaint. Ultimately, the issue made it all the way to the Secretary General of the League of Nations, where it was also dismissed.

After the elections of 1935 the opposition parties, except of the Polish Party, jointly brought in a charge of electoral fraud to the Danzig High Court and unsuccessfully protested to the League of Nations. In the aftermath of the German–Polish declaration of non-aggression Poland did not support an international action and as the foreign envoy of the opposition, Erich Brost, reports the Polish government often "raised up more goodwill towards the Nazi government than other European countries of that time".

In October 1936, 120 politicians of the Social Democratic Party were imprisoned and on 14 October the party was banned.

On 25 May 1937, the Social Democrat politician Hans Wiechmann was killed by the Gestapo after a visit to the League of Nations' High Commissioner Carl Jacob Burckhardt.

== Election results ==
In the Volkstag elections the party received:

Year	Votes	%	Seats	% of Seats
1920	24,409	15.93%	19	15.83%
1923	39,755	24.12%	30	25.00%
1927	61,779	33.79%	42	35.00%
1930	49,965	25.25%	19	26.39%
1933	37,882	17.69%	13	18.06%
1935	37,729	16.05%	12	16.67%

== Bibliography ==
- Andrzejewski, Marek. Socjaldemokratyczna Partia Wolnego Miasta Gdańska: 1920–1936. Gdańsk: Zakład Narodowy im. Ossolińskich, 1980.
