= 1930 Free City of Danzig parliamentary election =

- 16 November 1930
- All 72 members of the Volkstag
- Turnout: 89.07%
| Party | Vote % | Seats | +/– |
|---|---|---|---|
| SPFSD | 25.25 | 19 | −23 |
| NSDAP | 16.40 | 12 | +11 |
| Centre | 15.28 | 11 | −7 |
| DNVP | 13.11 | 10 | −15 |
| KP | 10.21 | 7 | −1 |
| German Danziger Economy Party | 3.22 | 2 | New |
| German National Community State List | 2.68 | 3 | New |
| PP | 2.41 | 2 | −1 |
| Bourgeois Working Alliance | 2.37 | 2 | −1 |
| National Liberal Citizens' Party | 2.22 | 2 | −2 |
| Danzig Railway and Port Staff | 1.76 | 1 | New |
| DDP | 1.64 | 1 | −3 |
This lists parties that won seats. See the complete results below.

Parliamentary elections were held in the Free City of Danzig on 16 November 1930. The Social Democratic Party emerged as the largest party, receiving 25% of the vote and winning 19 of the 72 seats in the Volkstag. Voter turnout was 89%.

== Results ==
| Party | Votes | % | Seats | +/– |
|---|---|---|---|---|
| Social Democratic Party | 49,965 | 25.25 | 19 | –23 |
| Nazi Party | 32,457 | 16.40 | 12 | +11 |
| Centre Party | 30,230 | 15.28 | 11 | –7 |
| German National People's Party | 25,938 | 13.11 | 10 | –15 |
| Communist Party | 20,194 | 10.21 | 7 | –1 |
| German Danziger Economy Party | 6,368 | 3.22 | 2 | New |
| German National Community State List | 5,312 | 2.68 | 3 | New |
| Poles | 4,763 | 2.41 | 2 | –1 |
| Bourgeois Working Alliance | 4,685 | 2.37 | 2 | –1 |
| National Liberal Citizens' Party | 4,400 | 2.22 | 2 | –2 |
| Danzig Railway and Port Staff | 3,480 | 1.76 | 1 | New |
| German Liberal Party | 3,254 | 1.64 | 1 | –3 |
| Polish-Catholic Party | 1,614 | 0.82 | 0 | New |
| Christian People's Party | 1,605 | 0.81 | 0 | New |
| German People's Community City List | 1,396 | 0.71 | 0 | New |
| Tenants' Party | 1,312 | 0.66 | 0 | New |
| Fishermen and Smokers | 898 | 0.45 | 0 | New |
| Total | 197,871 | 100.00 | 72 | –48 |
| Valid votes | 197,871 | 99.82 | | |
| Invalid/blank votes | 366 | 0.18 | | |
| Total votes | 198,237 | 100.00 | | |
| Registered voters/turnout | 222,566 | 89.07 | | |
Source: Gonschior.de
