= Volkstag =

Parliament of the Free City of Danzig

- Coat of arms of Free City of Danzig

Type
- Type: Unicameral

History
- Founded: June 14, 1920
- Disbanded: September 1, 1939

Elections
- First election: 1920
- Last election: 1935

Meeting place
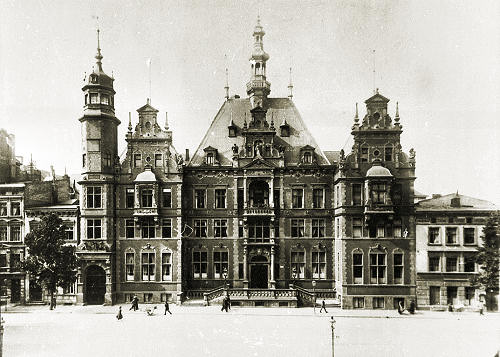

The Volkstag (English: People's Diet) was the parliament of the Free City of Danzig between 1919 and 1939.

After World War I Danzig (Gdańsk) became a Free City under the protection of the League of Nations. The first elections to a constitutional convention took place on 16 May 1920, and the first parliamentary session on 14 June 1920 at the former West Prussian Provincial administration building (Provinzialverwaltung – Landeshaus), Neugarten (today Nowe Ogrody). The building was demolished after World War II.

The Volkstag was elected by the male and female citizens of Danzig above 20 years of age; members of the Volkstag were required to be above 25 years of age. Further elections were held in 1923, 1927, 1930, 1933 and 1935.

== History ==
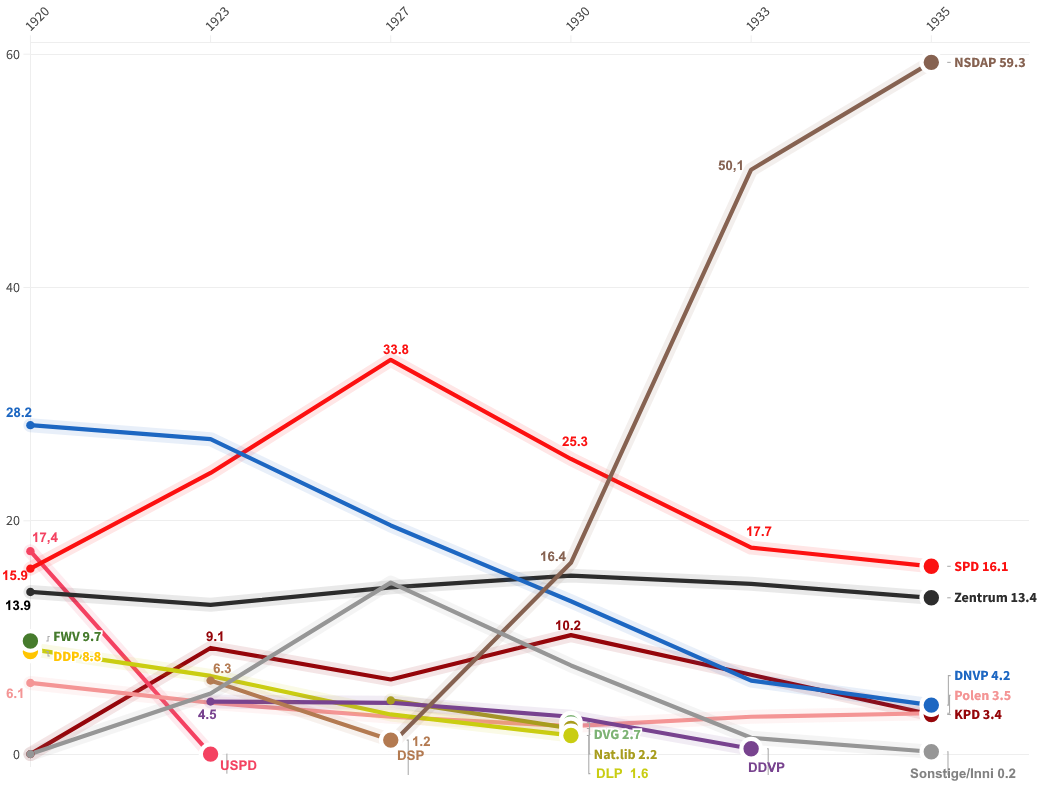
Graph of support for political parties in the Free City of Danzig

=== 1920 elections ===
Constituent Assembly elections were held in Danzig on 16 May 1920. The German National People's Party emerged as the largest party, receiving 28% of the vote and winning 34 of the 120 seats in the Volkstag. Voter turnout was 70%.

=== 1923 elections ===
Parliamentary elections were held in Danzig on 18 November 1923. The German National People's Party emerged as the largest party, receiving 27% of the vote and winning 33 of the 120 seats in the Volkstag. Voter turnout was 82%.

=== 1927 elections ===
Parliamentary elections were held in Danzig on 13 November 1927. The Social Democratic Party emerged as the largest party, receiving 34% of the vote and winning 42 of the 120 seats in the Volkstag. Voter turnout was 85%.

=== 1930 elections ===
Parliamentary elections were held in the Danzig on 16 November 1930. The Social Democratic Party emerged as the largest party, receiving 25% of the vote and winning 19 of the 72 seats in the Volkstag. Voter turnout was 89%. This would be the last time a non-Nazi party would hold power in the city.

=== 1933 elections ===
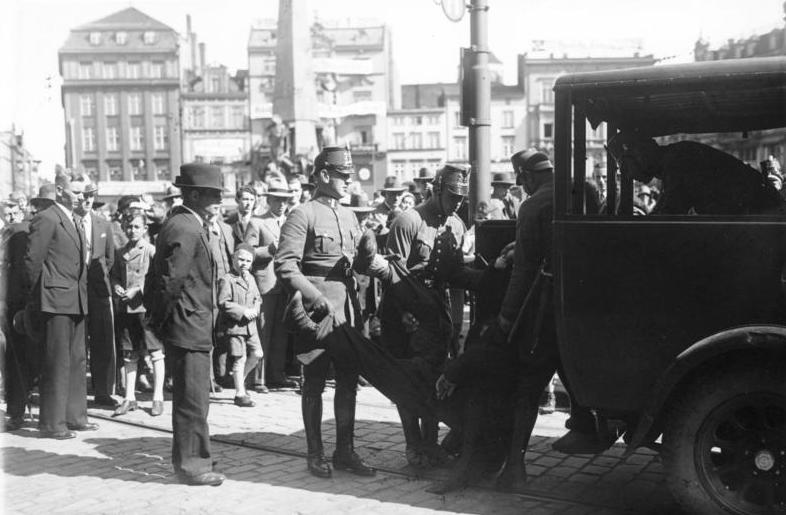
Police arrest a "troublemaker" at the 1933 elections.

After the Polish state increased its Westerplatte garrison by 120 soldiers, the local populace's fear of a Polish invasion was used by the Nazi party to boost their election chances. Provocative marches, speeches and a broadcast of Hitler's speech resulted in an absolute majority (50.03%) of the vote in the 28 May 1933 election.

=== 1935 elections ===
After the successful Saar plebiscite, where more than 90 percent of the Saar populace voted in favour of Germany, the Nazis expected to achieve a similar success in Danzig and dissolved the Volkstag on 21 February 1935. New elections were scheduled for 7 April 1935. In the following weeks the Nazi Party organized more than 1,300 rallies, the local radio station was exclusively used for their propaganda and the usage of public poster pillars was also limited to Nazi propaganda. At the same time, the opposition parties were subject to a massive terror campaign; the Social Democrats were only able to organize seven rallies, only one of which was in a major hall, and all of which were disturbed by the SA, a Nazi paramilitary force. Most other parties were unable to organize any public meetings. The Social Democrat newspaper Danziger Volksstimme and the Catholic Danziger Volkszeitung were banned twice, and the Volksstimme was furthermore confiscated in the last three days prior to the election.

However, the result of the elections (59.31% of votes for the Nazi party) was not as good as the Nazis had expected, and the planned parade of the local SA and SS units was canceled. Gauleiter Albert Forster, who started to announce the results on the radio, stopped in his speech and did not read out the results.

==== Action of Voidance ====
The opposition parties, except for the Polish Party, immediately filed a lawsuit at the Danzig High Court, where they specified 45 examples of illegal manipulation of the elections by the Nazis, including the direct threat of dismissal from public service by the Gauleiter to any official not voting for the Nazis. The secrecy of the ballot was not warranted and people who were not citizens of the Free City of Danzig had voted. The High Court examined 988 witnesses and found 40 out of 45 claims valid. However the High Court did not agree to cancel the election results, but only changed them in part: the Nazi party had to give away one seat, which was then granted to the Social Democrats.

==== League of Nations petition ====
The Social Democrats, German National and Centre parties did not accept the court verdict and protested to the League of Nations. Anthony Eden, responsible for the Danzig affairs at the League of Nations, reported the breach of the constitution on 22 January 1936. Although Spain and the Soviet Union supported immediate action, France, Turkey, Portugal and Australia preferred not to tolerate such actions in the future, while Denmark and Poland did not support any consequences. The council adjourned a decision, and after Danzig's President Arthur Greiser promised to maintain the constitution in the future, the League of Nations abandoned the petition.

==== Dictatorship ====
Following the elections the opposition was fiercely terrorized; members of the Volkstag were attacked and leaflet distributors were beaten up. A conservative member of the German National People's Party (DNVP), Curt Blavier, a former Senator and vice president of Danzig's police, was arrested. Newspapers were banned. On 10 June 1936 a meeting of the DNVP was attacked by about 100 SA and SS members, with 50 attendees requiring hospital treatment. Gustav Pietsch, an independent candidate sympathizing with the conservative DNVP, was attacked with an iron bar, pushed in front of a tram and severely injured. The DNVP "voluntarily" declared its self-dissolution.

In October 1936 120 members of the Social Democratic Party were imprisoned, and on 14 October the party was banned. On 25 May 1937 the Social Democrat politician Hans Wiechmann was killed by the Gestapo after a visit to the League of Nations' High Commissioner Carl Jacob Burckhardt.

In December 1936 leading members of the Centre Party were arrested, including several members of the Volkstag, a judge and a high public official. The Centre Party, the last opposition party, was banned in October 1937 and its Chairman, Bruno Kurowski, imprisoned.

On 21 March 1939, Greiser extended the Volkstag term for another 4 years.

== Elections ==
Results of the Volkstag elections 1919–1935
Party	1919 (Note: 1919 elections to the German National Assembly prior to the foundation of the Free City)		1920		1923		1927		1930		1933		1935	
Party	%	Seats	%	Seats	%	Seats	%	Seats	%	Seats	%	Seats	%	Seats
NSDAP	–	–	–	–	–	–	0.81	1	16.4	12	50.12	38	59.31	43
DNVP	15.33	–	28.20	34	26.98	33	19.59	25	13.11	10	6.35	4	4.17	3
German Social Party	–	–	–	–	6.25	7	1.16	1	–	–	–	–	–	–
German Democratic Party	23.78	–	8.76	10	6.68	8	3.39	4	1.64	1	–	–	–	–
Centre Party	16.27	–	13.88	17	12.81	15	14.27	18	15.28	11	14.63	10	13.41	10
Social Democrats	38.51	–	15.93	19	24.12	30	33.79	42	25.25	19	17.69	13	16.05	12
USPD	6.12	–	17.45	21	–	–	–	–	–	–	–	–	–	–
Communist Party	–	–	–	–	9.09	11	6.40	8	10.21	7	6.80	5	3.37	2
Freie Wirtschaftliche Vereinigung	–	–	9.71	12	2.90	3	1.22	1	3.22	2	–	–	–	–
German Liberal Party	–	–	–	–	–	–	–	–	3.39	3	–	–	–	–
National Liberal Citizens' Party	–	–	–	–	–	–	4.56	5	2.22	2	–	–	–	–
Danzig National Party - Hanseatic Union	–	–	–	–	4.49	5	5.19	6	9.17	10	17.02	13	–	–
Bourgeois Working Alliance	–	–	–	–	–	–	2.31	3	2.37	2	–	–	–	–
Polish Party	–	–	6.08	7	4.38	5	3.15	3	3.23 (Note: including 0.82 % Polish Catholic Party)	2	3.15 (Note: including 1.1 % Polish List "Dr. Moczynski")	2	3.53	2
Others	–	–	–	–	2.29	2	4.97	4	3.68	1	1.25	–	0.16	–
Total	100			120	100	120	100	120	100	72	100	72	100	72
Voter turnout		–	70.4	–	81.60	–	85.43	–	89.07	–	92.09	–	99.5	–

== Presidents of the Volkstag ==
- 1920–1921: Wilhelm Reinhard
- 1921-1921: Adalbert Mathaei
- 1921–1923: Adolf Treichel (first term)
- 1923–1924: Julius Gehl (first term)
- 1924–1926: Adolf Treichel (second term)
- 1926–1928: Alfred Semrau
- 1928–1930: Fritz Spill
- 1930–1931: Julius Gehl (second term)
- 1931–1933: Wilhelm von Wnuck (first term)
- 1933-1933: Franz Potrykus
- 1933–1936: Wilhelm von Wnuck (second term)
- 1937–1939: Edmund Beyl
