= Andrzej Januszajtis =

Polish politician (1928–2026)

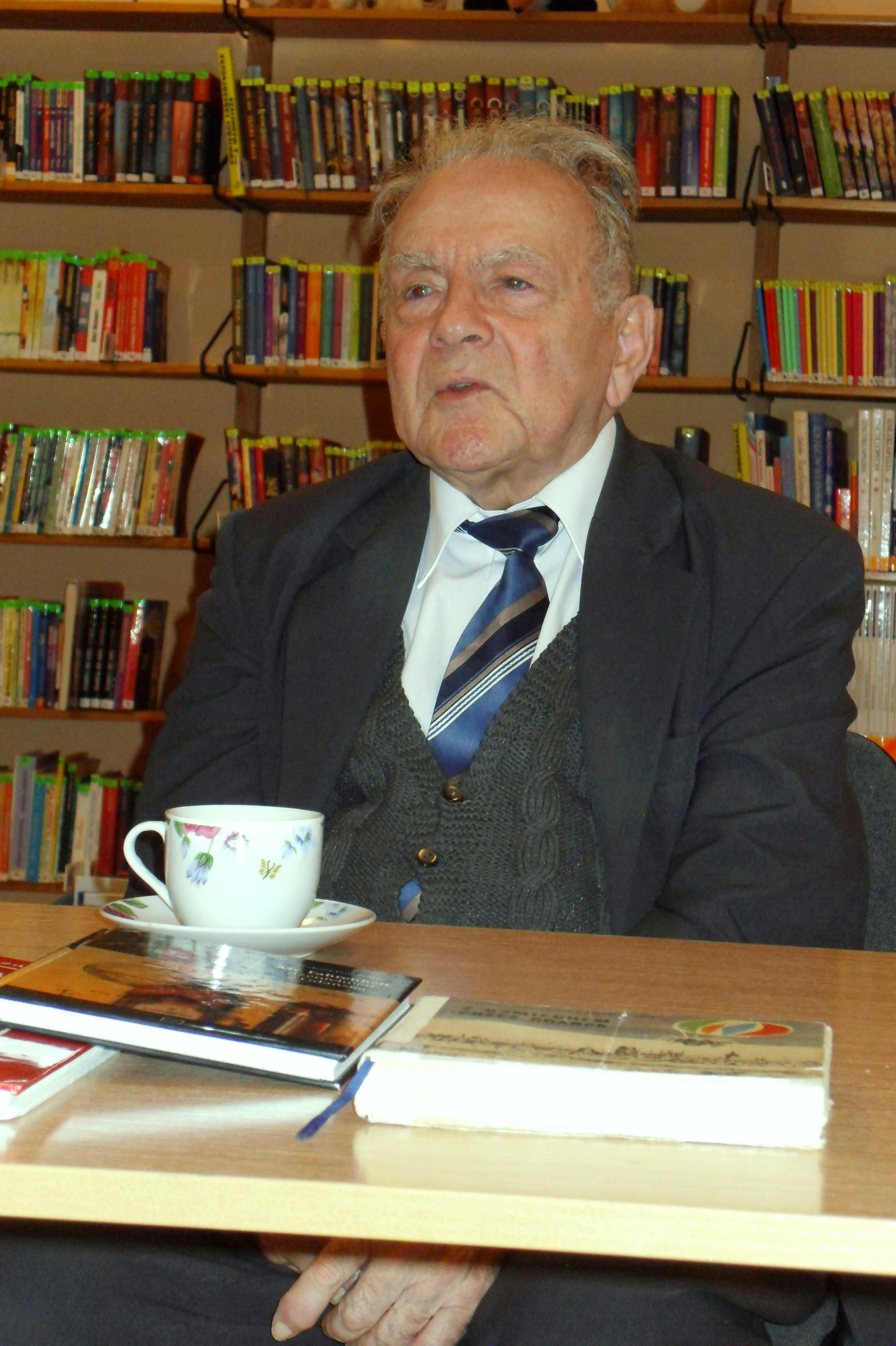
- Januszajtis in 2014

Chairman of the City Council of Gdańsk
- In office 1990–1994
- Preceded by: Franciszek Jamroż
- Succeeded by: Paweł Adamowicz

Personal details
- Born: 18 August 1928 Lida, Poland (now Belarus)
- Died: 22 January 2026 (aged 97)

Andrzej Januszajtis (18 August 1928 – 22 January 2026) was a Polish physicist, academic and politician who served as the Chairman of the City Council of Gdańsk from 1991 to 1994. Januszajtis died on 22 January 2026, at the age of 97.
