= Magdalena Adamowicz =

Polish politician

Magdalena Adamowicz MEP
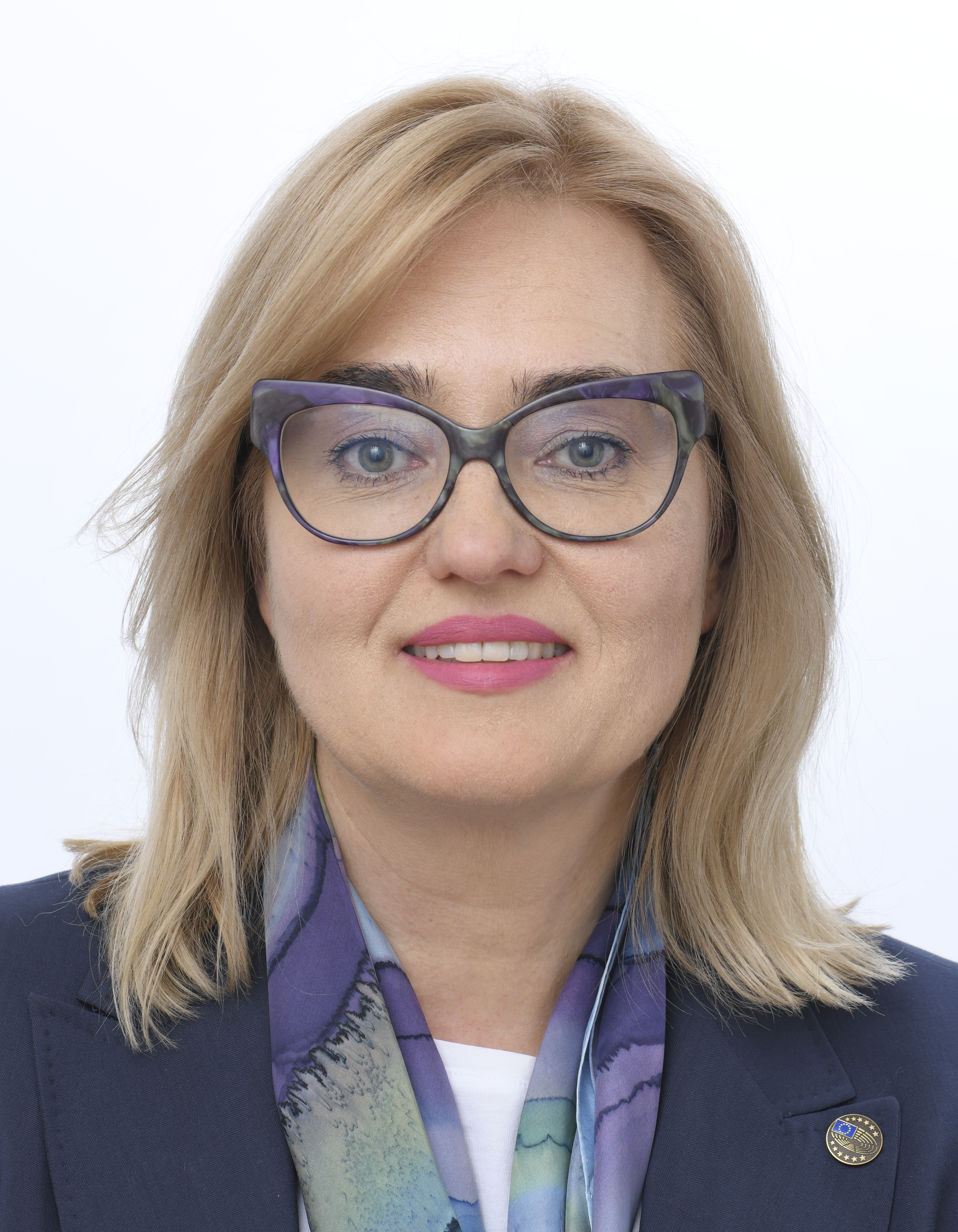

Member of the European Parliament for Pomeranian
- Incumbent
- Assumed office 2 July 2019

Personal details
- Born: Magdalena Abramska; 10 April 1973 (age 53) Słupsk, Poland
- Party: Polish: Civic Coalition (Since 2019); EU: European People's Party (Since 2019)
- Spouse: Paweł Adamowicz (m. 1999; died 2019)
- Children: 2
- Education: University of Gdańsk

Magdalena Adamowicz (née Abramska; born 10 April 1973) is a Polish politician and the widow of Paweł Adamowicz. She was elected to the European Parliament in the 2019 election as part of the center-left European Coalition opposition. She has since been serving on the Committee on Transport and Tourism.

In addition to her committee assignments, Adamowicz is part of the Parliament's delegation for relations to South Africa. She is also a member of the European Parliament Intergroup on Seas, Rivers, Islands and Coastal Areas and the URBAN Intergroup.

== Education ==
Magdalena Adamowicz studied in Primary School number 14 named after Janusz Korczak in Słupsk and 1st High School named after Bolesław III Wrymouth in Słupsk. Then she graduated from the faculty of law at the University of Gdańsk and completed Legal Counsel application. In 2003 she was awarded a Gdańsk Doctor of Philosophy at the faculty of law for her dissertation: The role of the mutual insurance companies in the business insurance system, which was supervised by professor Janina Ciechanowicz-McLean. In the same year she was appointed as an assistant professor at the faculty of Admiralty law. She is a graduate of the English and European school of law organised by the University of Cambridge and the School of German law organised by the University of Bonn. In 2013 she completed her MBA postgraduate studies organised in collaboration with the University of Northampton and the Higher Banking School in Gdańsk. She trained also in Cologne, Barcelona, Monachium, Hamburg, Antwerp and Brussels.

== Career ==
She started in the 2019 European Parliament election from the second place on the European Coalition candidates list in the ward number 1 as a candidate recommended by the Civic Platform. Adamowicz received 199,591 votes (24.12% of votes in the ward) and hence was elected to the EP with the higher result in the ward. As an MEP she joined European People's Party group. She became a member of Transportation and Tourism Committee as well as a part of the Parliament's delegation for relations to South Africa and also a substitute member of the Law Committee and the Committee of Civil Freedom, Justice and Internal Affairs.

=== Legal issues ===
In August 2020, the Polish National Prosecutors office brought charges of tax evasion against Magdalena Adamowicz, accusing her of concealment of tax returns for 2011–2012. The prosecutor's office accuses her of non-disclosure of nearly 300,000 PLN and 100 thousand. PLN of income in tax returns for 2011 and 2012.

== Private life ==
Between 1999 and 2019, Adamowicz was married to Paweł Adamowicz who served as mayor of the city of Gdańsk until he was murdered by a mentally unstable ex-convict. From this marriage, she has two daughters: Antonina (born 2003) and Teresa (born 2010). Her sister Beata is married to the mayor of Grudziądz, Maciej Glamowski.

== Books ==
- Magdalena Adamowicz, Justyna Nawrot (red.), Europeizacja prawa morskiego, Gdańsk: Arche Publishing House, 2016, ISBN 978-83-88445-62-0, (in Polish)
