= Jerzy Młynarczyk =

Polish politician and basketball player

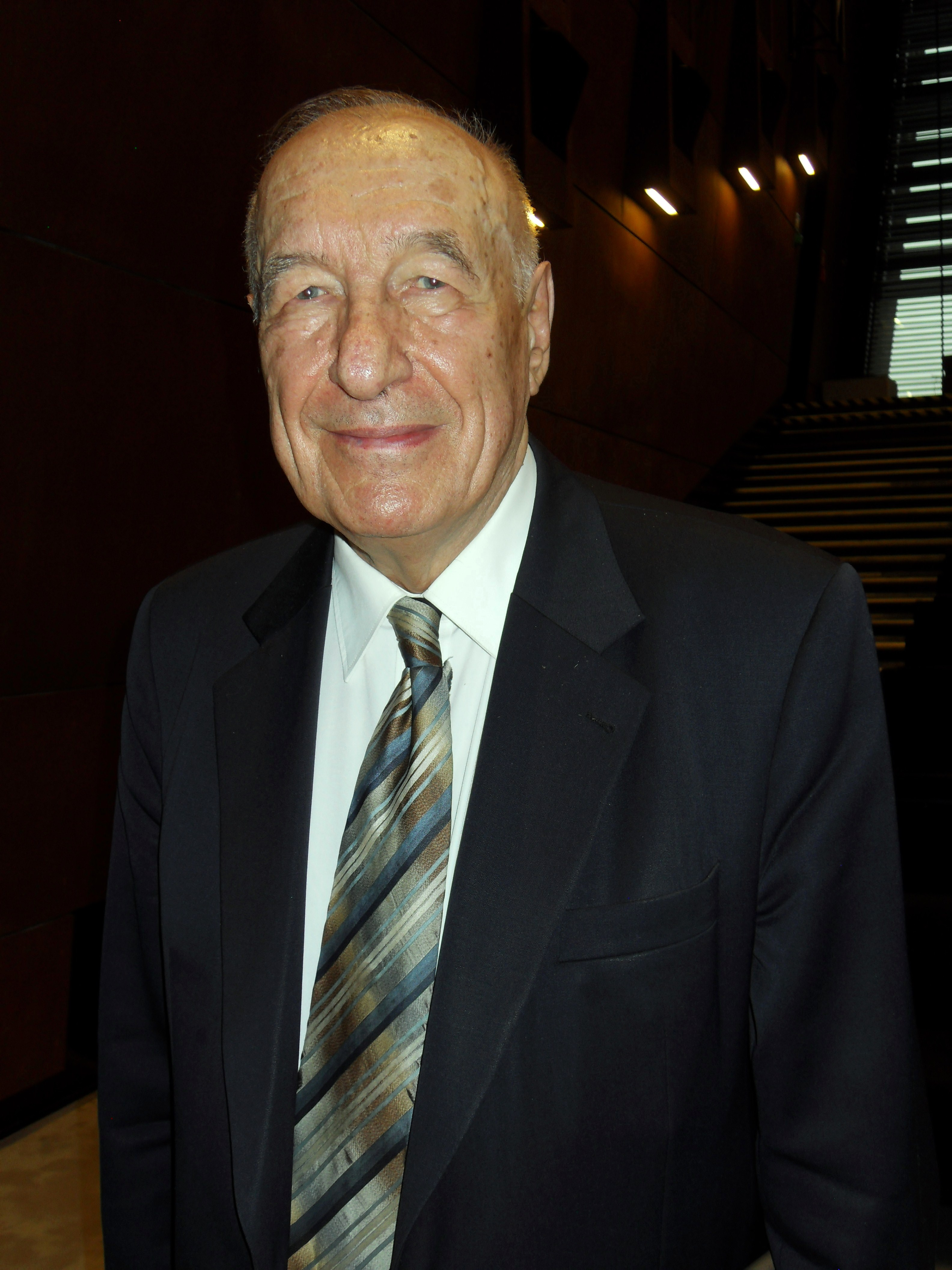

Mayor of Gdańsk
- In office 15 September 1977 – 22 December 1981
- Preceded by: Andrzej Kaznowski
- Succeeded by: Kazimierz Rynkowski

Member of Sejm
- In office 19 October 2001 – 18 October 2005

Personal details
- Born: 2 August 1931; Wilno, Poland
- Died: 9 September 2017 (aged 86); Gdańsk, Poland
- Political party: Social Democracy of Poland

Jerzy Młynarczyk (2 August 1931 – 9 September 2017) was a Polish politician and basketball player. He was born in Wilno, Poland (now Vilnius, Lithuania). He competed in the men's tournament at the 1960 Summer Olympics. He was professor of law, including principal of University of Business and Administration in Gdynia and served as a Mayor of Gdańsk in 1977–1981. He was also member of the Polish parliament (Sejm) from 2001 to 2005 for the Social Democracy of Poland party.
