= Free City of Danzig (Napoleonic) =

Napoleonic semi-independent city state

Coordinates: 54.35°N 18.6667°E

Free City of Danzig Ville libre de Dantzig (French) Freie Stadt Danzig (German) Wolne Miasto Gdańsk (Polish)
- 1807–1814
- Flag Coat of arms

- The Free City of Danzig in 1812
- Status: Client state of the French Empire under the protection of Saxony and Prussia
- Capital: Danzig
- Common languages: Official: German Minorities: Polish; Yiddish; Kashubian
- Religion: Lutheranism; Roman Catholic; Judaism; Mennonites
- Government: Constitutional republic
- Governor
  - 1807–1814: Jean Rapp
- Mayor
  - 1807–1808: Carl von Gralath
  - 1808–1812: Gottlieb Hufeland
  - 1812–1814: Johann Wernsdorff
- Historical era: Napoleonic Wars
  - Established: 21 July 1807
  - Disestablished: 2 January 1814

Area
  - Total: 478 km^{2} (185 sq mi)

Population
  - Census: 64,234
Preceded by	Succeeded by
West Prussia	West Prussia
- Today part of: Poland

The Free City of Danzig (French: Ville libre de Dantzig; German: Freie Stadt Danzig; Polish: Wolne Miasto Gdańsk), sometimes referred to as the Republic of Danzig (French: République de Dantzig; German: Republik Danzig), was a semi-independent city-state established by Napoleon on 21 July 1807, during the time of the Napoleonic Wars following the capture of the city in the siege of Danzig in May. After the Congress of Vienna of 1814–1815, Danzig was re-incorporated into the Kingdom of Prussia.

== History ==
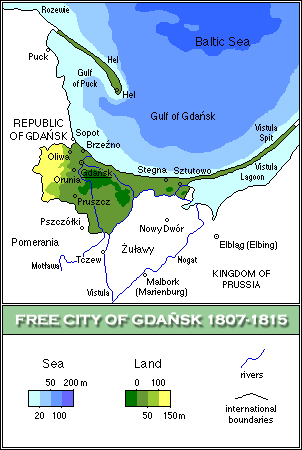
A map of the Free City of Danzig immediately after it was established, according to the Danzig-Prussian Convention signed on 6 December 1807.

Prussia had acquired the city of Danzig (now Gdańsk, Poland) in the course of the Second Partition of Poland in 1793. After the defeat of King Frederick William III of Prussia at the 1806 Battle of Jena–Auerstedt, according to the Franco-Prussian Treaty of Tilsit of 9 July 1807, the territory of the free state was carved out from lands that made up part of the West Prussia province. It consisted of the city of Danzig along with its rural surroundings on the mouth of Vistula, through Oliva, together with the Hel Peninsula and its lighthouse as well as the southern half of the Vistula Spit up to Narmeln.

The Republic was officially proclaimed on 21 July 1807, after the Imperial French troops had handed over the city on 27 May. Prussia and the Kingdom of Saxony under Frederick Augustus I, also Duke of Warsaw, were appointed guarantee powers. Marshal François Joseph Lefebvre, commander of the Danzig siege, received the honorific title of Duc de Danzig from the hands of Napoleon; however, the actual ruler of the city was the French governor General Jean Rapp. The citizens had to accommodate Napoleon's Grande Armée forces and pay large tributes in the preparation of the French invasion of Russia in 1812.

After the French retreat, the Imperial Russian forces laid siege to the city from late January to 29 November 1813, and the remaining c. 40,000 French soldiers finally withdrew on 2 January 1814. Although the Prussian authorities made it the capital of West Prussia and the administrative centre of the Regierungsbezirk Danzig, the autonomy of the city was significantly reduced.

== Economy ==
During a military blockade of the Baltic Sea, multiple trading houses in the city went bankrupt. Until 1809, only four trading houses survived the siege and the blockade. During its existence, the city was constantly facing an economic crisis. This was caused by multiple factors, mainly the Continental Blockade enforced by the French Empire. This was particularly damaging for Danzig, because the United Kingdom was one of the most important trading partners for the city, which can be seen by the fact that 89% of grain exports from Danzig went there. The number of trading ships entering the port of Danzig decreased significantly from 1806 to 1807, going from 377 to only 58, which could show how bad the blockade was.

Despite the 20th article of the Treaty of Tilsit prohibiting the city's protectors from putting any new tolls on trade along the Vistula, the Prussians decided to reinstate their former tolls. This caused a problem for the city, since its biggest source of income was the export of various goods along that river.

Following the establishment of the republic, it was forced to pay contributions to the French Empire. The biggest problem for the city was the sum of money it was supposed to pay, which greatly exceeded the funds owned by the city. The initial sum equalled 30,619,290 French francs, but it was eventually agreed that the city would pay 3 million francs each year instead. According to a financial arrangement signed on 27 July 1810, the remaining contributions the state still had to pay equalled 16,762,600 francs in total. Other than the contributions, the city was supposed to pay for the upkeep of the French garrison stationed in the city, which included paying for the magazines, the barracks, hospitals and guns. The city was also preparing in the case of another siege, which is why it had to pay for artillery, defence embankments, repairments of fortifications destroyed in 1807 and supplies. All of this amounted to a sum of 19,373,920.55 francs that were spent in the span of five years, from 1807 to 31 May 1812.

=== Currency ===
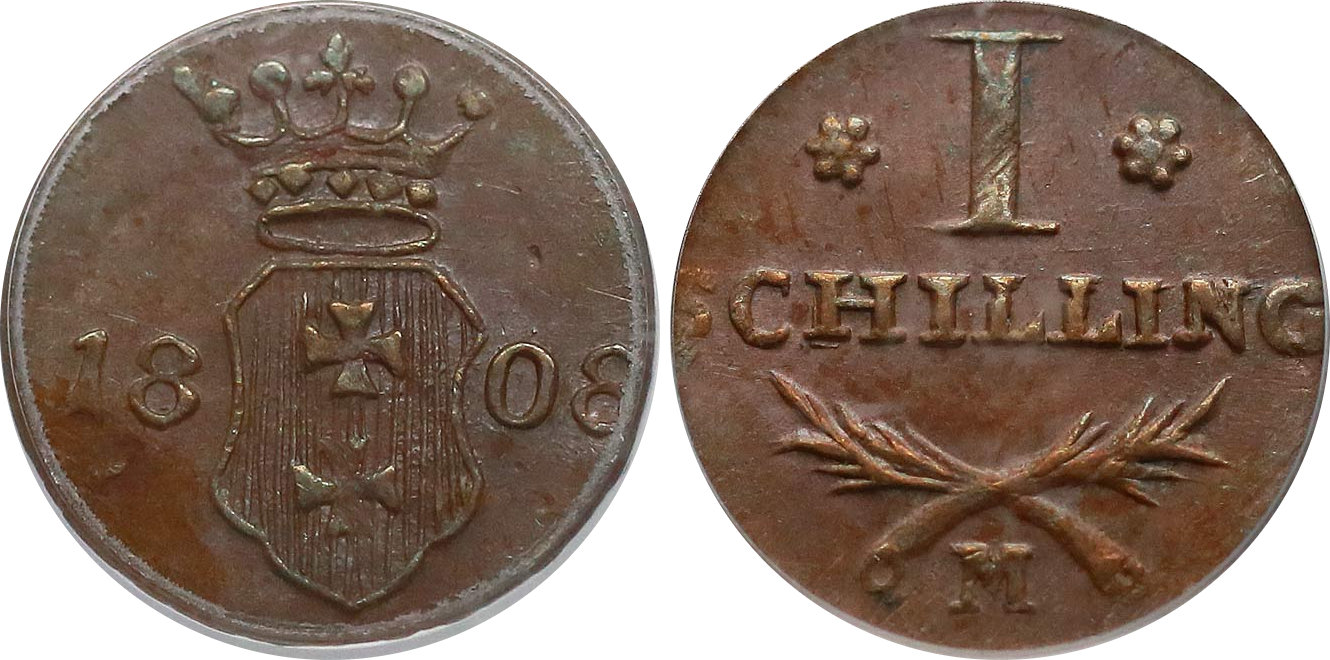
1 Schilling from 1808 minted in Danzig. The letter "M" can be seen below the denomination.

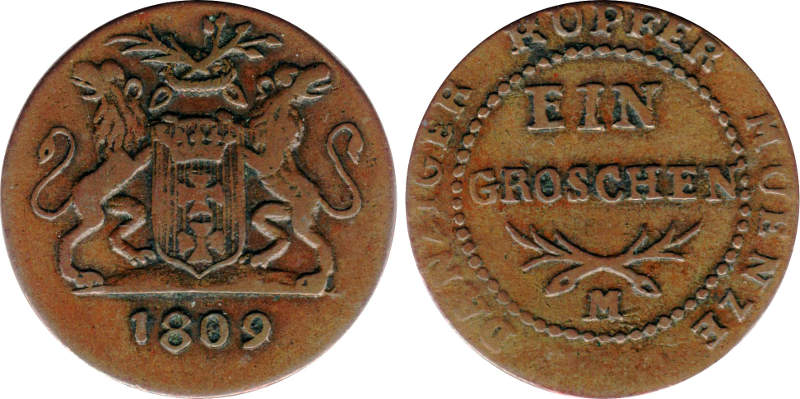
1 Groschen from 1809, equal to three Schilling.

After the Free City of Danzig was established, following the Treaty of Tilsit, its mint was re-opened the following year. The city lacked small coins, often used for trade, which is why it decided to start minting them. Johann Ludwig Meyer was appointed the supervisor of the mint and the designer, which is why all of these coins feature the letter 'M' at the bottom. The mint struck three types of coins, which were the Schilling and Groschen, made out of copper, and the six Groschen (1/5 Gulden) coins struck as pattern coins, struck on silver planchets. The first coin to be minted was the Schilling, minted both in 1808 and 1812. It was the smallest copper coin minted by the city, weighing 1.2g and measuring 16mm. The next year, the mint decided to mint the Groschen, which weighed 3.2g and had a diameter of 21mm. This coin would also be minted again in 1812. The six Groschen coin was struck both in 1808 and 1809, featuring German text, 5 Einer Danziger Gulden. (1/5 Danziger Gulden). These coins never entered circulation since they contained silver and the senate had to decline the project, which led to a stop in further mintage. These coins were struck in accordance with the Münzfuß of Poland in 1766, where 30 Groschen were equal to one Polish złoty. When Napoleonic France, the country that the republic depended on, was taking multiple losses, the city was forced to close the mint in 1813.

== See also ==
- Administrations of Danzig before April 1945
- Free City of Danzig – Semi-autonomous European city-state (1920–1939)
- History of Gdańsk

≠== References ==
