= Bogdan Oleszek =

Polish politician

Bogodan Oleszek
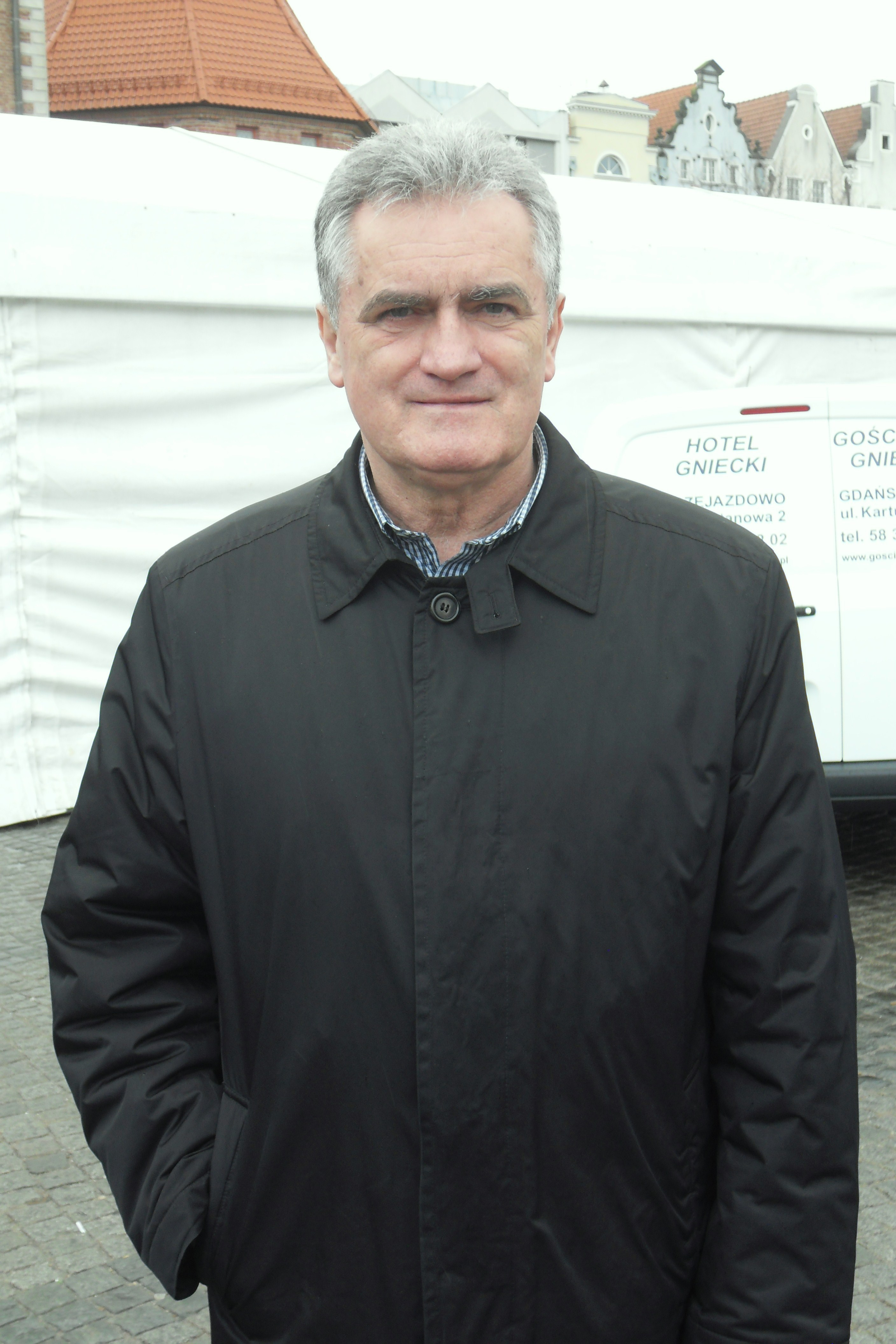

Chairman of the City Council of Gdańsk
- In office July 12, 2001 – November 19, 2018
- Preceded by: Elżbieta Grabarek-Bartoszewicz
- Succeeded by: Agnieszka Owczarczak

Personal details
- Born: 12 December 1948 (age 77) Warsaw, Poland
- Party: Civic Platform

Bogodan Olezek was a Polish Politician who served as the Chairman of the City Council of Gdańsk from 2001 to 2018.
