= Kazimierz Rynkowski =

Polish politician (1933–2022)

Mayor of Gdańsk
- In office 22 December 1981 – 23 November 1989
- Preceded by: Jerzy Młynarczyk
- Succeeded by: Jerzy Pasiński

Personal details
- Born: 9 September 1933 Pelplin, Poland
- Died: 10 June 2022 (aged 88) Gdańsk, Poland
- Political party: Polish United Workers' Party; Democratic Left Alliance
- Children: 1

Kazimierz Rynkowski (9 September 1933 – 10 June 2022) was a Polish Communist politician who was the mayor of Gdańsk from 1981 to 1989. He was notably the last mayor completely during the Polish People's Republic.

Born to Bernard Rynkowski and Marianna Kowal with 8 siblings, he became a construction worker in Gdańsk after World War II. In 1964, he graduated from Adam Mickiewicz University in Poznań with a master's degree in law. From 1957 to 1960, he was an employee of the Municipal Committee of the Polish United Workers' Party (PZPR) in Gdańsk, later serving in multiple positions in the party's bureaucracy in the city. From 1970 to 1973, he was the first deputy chairman of the Municipal National Council under Jan Nikołajew. From 1981 to 1989, he was the mayor of the city, the last fully under the Polish People's Republic. He was mayor during the rise of the Solidarity movement, which started in the city, as well as the institution of martial law in Poland and the subsequent periods of civil unrest throughout Poland in the 1980s that led to the unraveling of Communist Poland. He was succeeded by Jerzy Pasiński.

After the establishment of post-Communist Poland, from 2002 to 2012, he was the Pomeranian Spokesperson for party discipline of the Democratic Left Alliance. He had one daughter.

== Awards ==
(Source:)

- Order of Polonia Restituta (Knight's Cross (1974); Officer's Cross (1986))
- Cross of Merit (Silver (1964); Gold (1969))
