= Tomasz Posadzki =

Polish politician (born 1961)

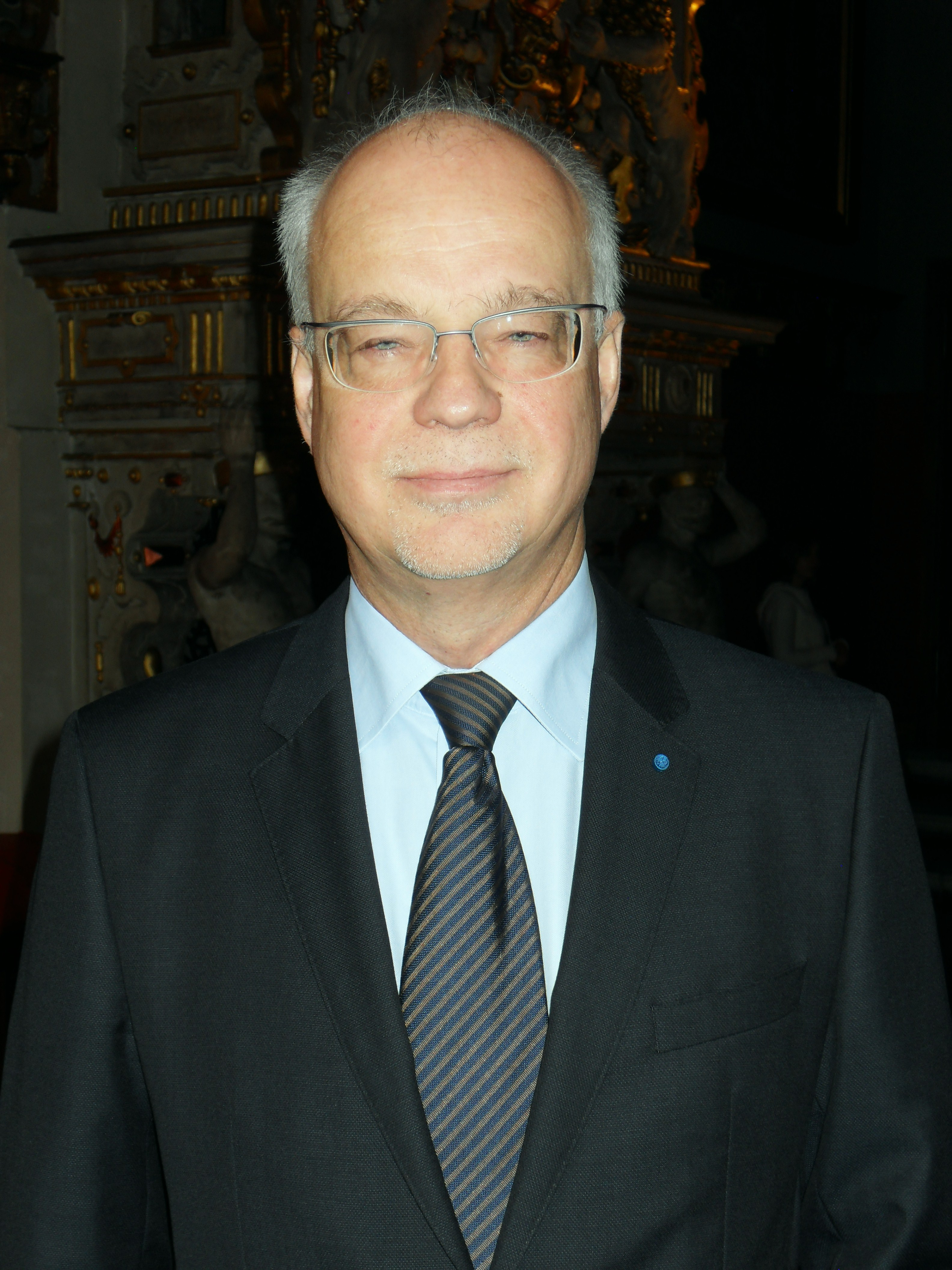

Mayor of Gdańsk
- In office 8 July 1994 – 26 October 1998
- Preceded by: Franciszek Jamroż
- Succeeded by: Paweł Adamowicz

Personal details
- Born: 13 November 1961 (age 63); Gdańsk, Poland
- Political party: Freedom Union

Tomasz Posadzki (Polish pronunciation: [ˈtɔmaʂ pɔˈsat͡skʲi]; born 13 November 1961) is the former mayor of Gdańsk, Poland, from 1994 to 1998.

A lawyer by profession, in 1986, he graduated from the Faculty of Law and Administration at the University of Gdańsk. In the early 1980s, he participated in organizing the Independent Students' Union.

After graduating, he was admitted to the bar and started to run his own lawyer's office in Gdańsk. From 1994 to 2002, he was a councilman in Gdańsk, and was the mayor of the city from 1994 to 1998. He was succeeded by Paweł Adamowicz. He was a member of the Association of Polish Cities. From 2000 to 2006, he was employed at Telewizja Polska, where he was the vice-president of its board and then the general director of corporate affairs.

Starting in the early 1990s, he was involved in the activities of the Democratic Union and Freedom Union parties. In 2005, he joined the Democratic Party. He applied unsuccessfully to run for the Sejm in 1991 and 1993 for the Democratic Union and to the Senate in 2007 for the Left and Democrats. In 2012, he was appointed Honorary Consul of Estonia in Gdańsk.

In 2010, he was awarded the fourth class of the Order of the Cross of Terra Mariana.
