= Agnieszka Owczarczak =

Polish Politician

Chairman of the City Council of Gdańsk
- Incumbent
- Assumed office November 19, 2018
- Preceded by: Bogdan Oleszek

Personal details
- Born: 1979; Gdańsk, Poland
- Political party: Civic Platform
- Spouse: Michał
- Children: 2

Agnieszka Owczarczak was a Polish Politician who served as the Chairman of the City Council of Gdańsk from 2018.

== Life ==
Owczarczak was a graduate of Faculty of Economics (foreign trade) and the Faculty of Management (organization and management) at the University of Gdańsk.

She is the deputy head of the Civic Platform in Gdansk, of which she has been a member in 2001. She was a member in the Young Democrats Association.

She was a Gdańsk councilor since 2006. also had been the vice-chairman of the City Council of Gdansk from 2009 to 2018, in the passing term she was the head of the spatial development committee.
