= Jacek Starościak =

Former mayor of Gdańsk, Poland (1947–2021)

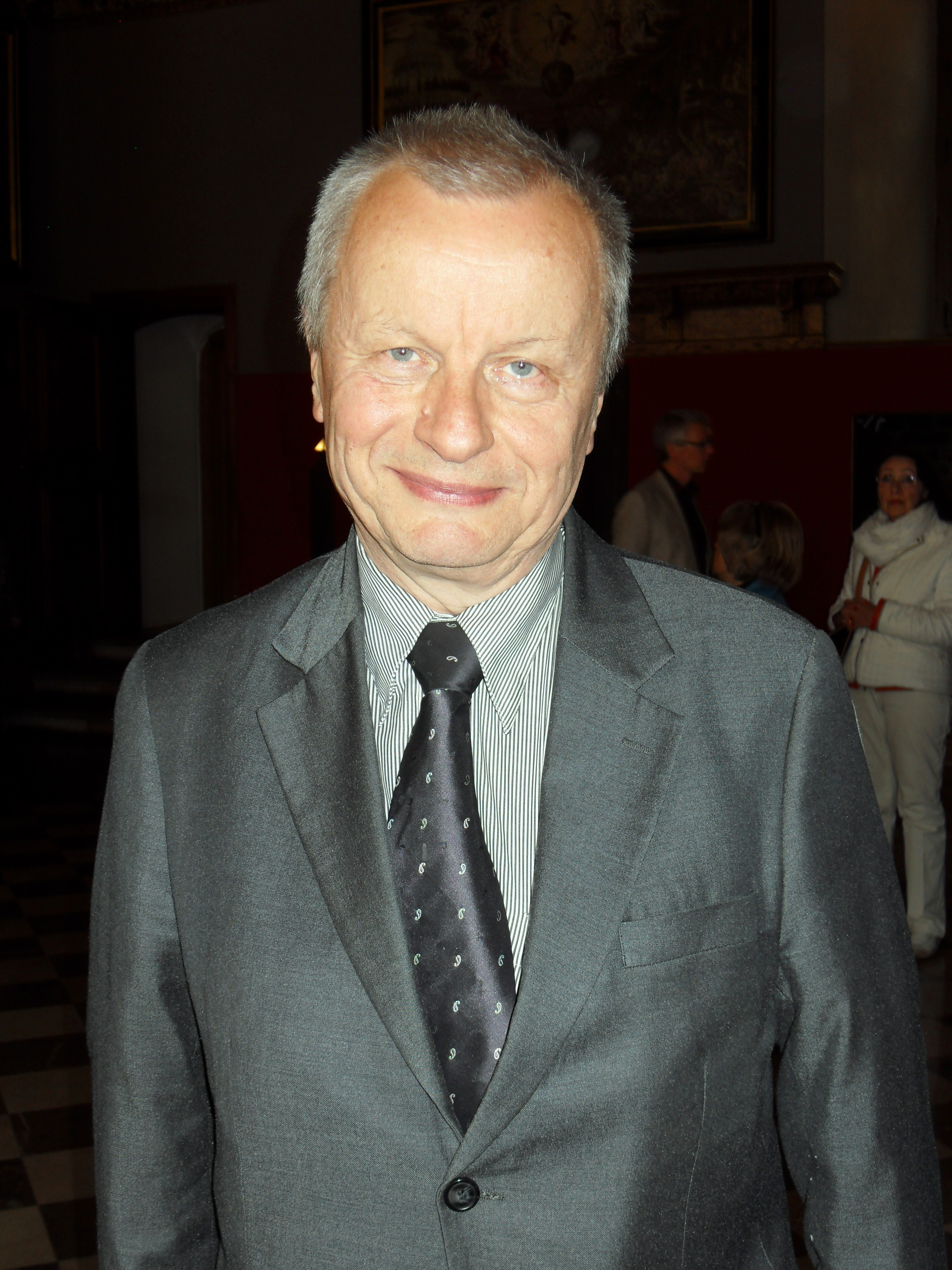

Mayor of Gdańsk
- In office 10 July 1990 – 8 June 1991
- Preceded by: Jerzy Pasiński
- Succeeded by: Franciszek Jamroż

Personal details
- Born: 10 September 1947 Gdańsk, Poland
- Died: May 8, 2021 (aged 73)
- Party: Solidarity Citizens' Committee

Jacek Mariusz Starościak [ˈjat͡sɛk starɔɕt͡siak] (10 September 1947, Gdańsk – 8 May 2021) was a Polish politician who was the mayor of Gdańsk from 1990 to 1991.

From 1965 to 1971, he studied at the Faculty of Electronics at Gdańsk University of Technology. From 1971 to 1973, he was an employee of the Navigation Department of Gdynia Maritime University, and later he became an assistant professor at the Maritime Institute in Gdańsk. In 1980, he joined Solidarity and chaired the factory commission in the institute. After the introduction of martial law, he was associated with the diocesan charity commission. In the second half of the 1980s, he was employed as the head of the Editors of Scientific and Professional Literature at the Maritime Publishing House. He co-founded a local branch of the Klub Inteligencji Katolickiej.

After the elections in 1989, he became the director of the voivodeship office of the parliamentary-senatorial Civic Parliamentary Club. In 1990, he became a councilman in Gdańsk, later being appointed mayor of the city, which he served until June 1991. In the same year, he became President of the Chancellery of the President of the Republic of Poland. From 1995 on, he worked at the Ministry of Foreign Affairs, including as the Polish Consul General in London (1996–1998) and the Minister's Advisor. As of 2003, he was employed at Bank Pekao.
