= List of city mayors of Gdańsk =

Mayor of City of Gdańsk
- Prezydent miasta Gdańska
- Coat of arms of Gdańsk

- Flag of Gdańsk

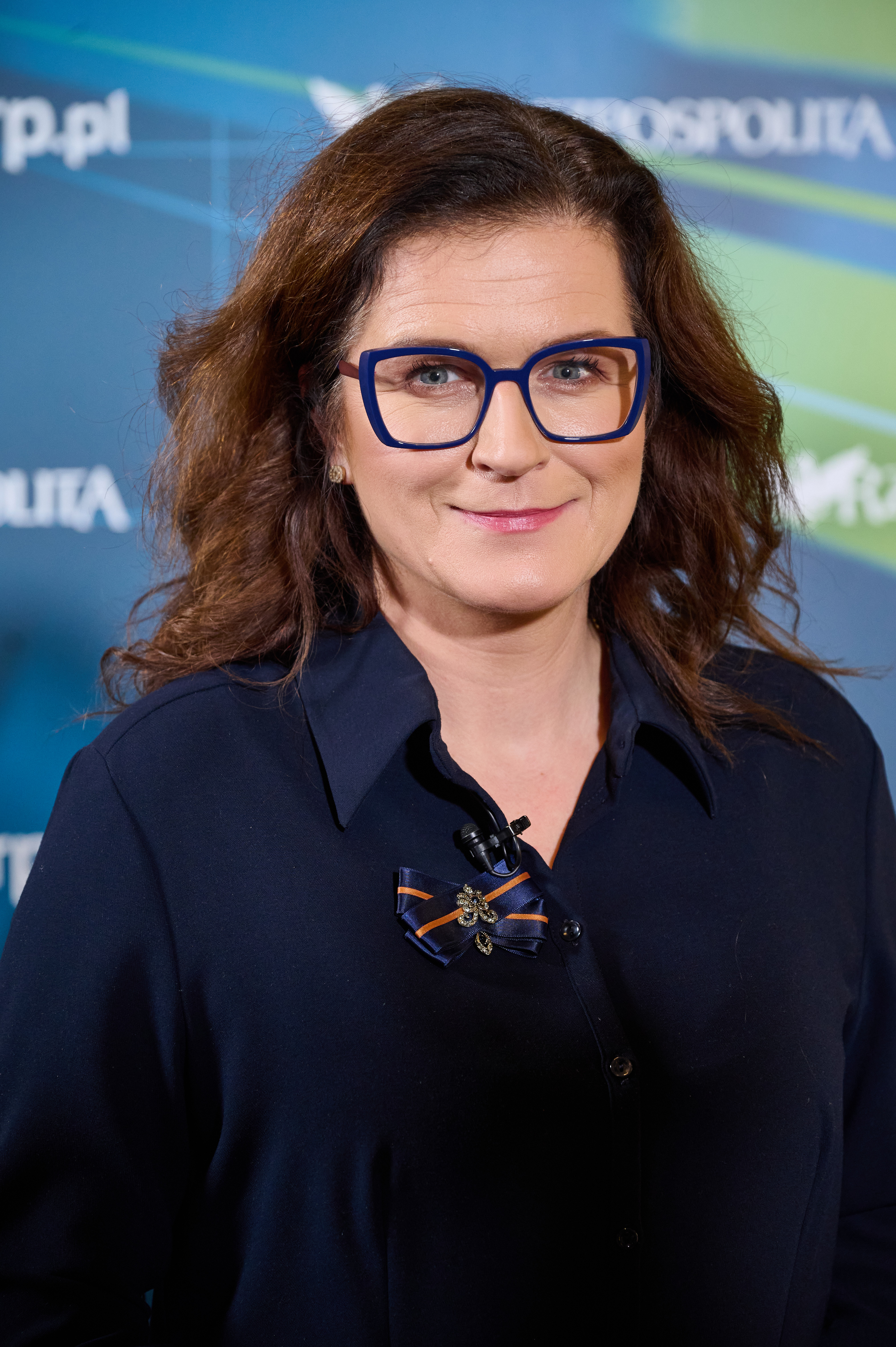
- Incumbent; Aleksandra Dulkiewicz since 11 March 2019
- Appointer: Electorate of Gdańsk
- Formation: 10th century AD or 1945
- Website: www.gdansk.pl/prezydent-miasta-gdanska

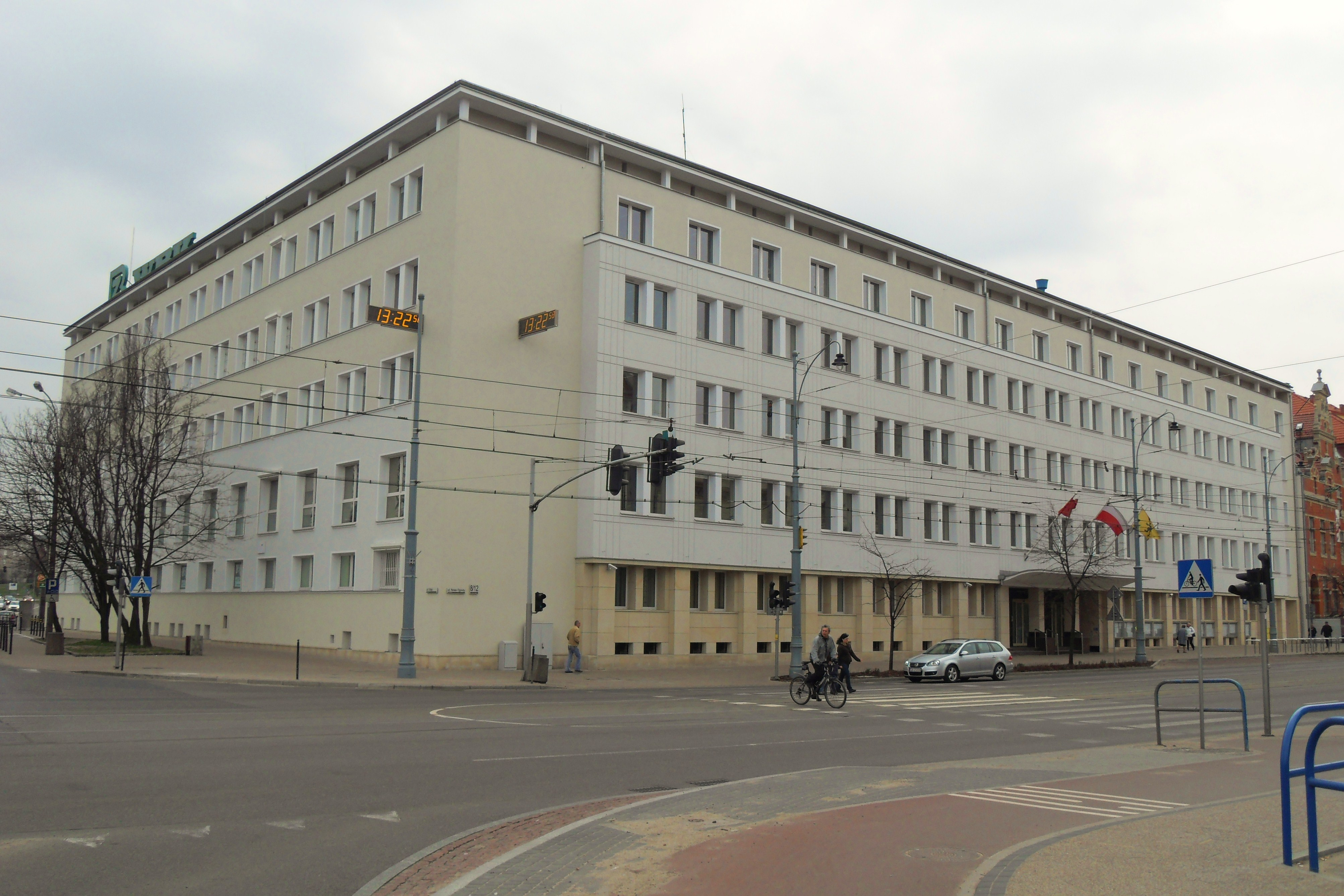
Office of the mayor

This article lists the people holding the office of president of Gdańsk (Polish: prezydent miasta Gdańska) from 1945 to the present day (or holders of the equivalent offices), as well as the historical offices of mayor of Danzig (German: Bürgermeister von Danzig) in the State of the Teutonic Order (1308–1454), mayor of Danzig (German: Oberbürgermeister von Danzig) in the Crown of the Kingdom of Poland (1454–1793) and the Kingdom of Prussia (1793–1919) and senate president of the Free City of Danzig (1919–1939).

== Historical outline ==
- 997 - Gdańsk first mentioned as urbs Gyddanyzc
- 1224 – Gdańsk received medieval city rights
- 1308 – Teutonic takeover of Danzig (Gdańsk)
- 1454 – Danzig reclaimed by the Crown of the Kingdom of Poland
- 1569 – Danzig subsumed into the Polish–Lithuanian Commonwealth
- 1793 – Danzig lost in the Second Partition of Poland to the Kingdom of Prussia, but not subsumed into the Holy Roman Empire
- 1807 – Danzig a Napoleonic free city under the Duchy of Warsaw and Prussia
- 1815 – Danzig under Prussian control, but not as part of Germany (the German Confederation)
- 1871 – Danzig a part of the German Empire
- 1920 – Free City of Danzig in a union with the Second Polish Republic concerning foreign, military, customs, rail and postal affairs
- 1939 – Danzig annexed by Nazi Germany at the beginning of World War II
- 1945 – Danzig annexed by Poland after World War II and renamed to Gdańsk

== Mayors of Gdańsk and equivalents ==
=== Mayors of Gdańsk 1945–1950 ===
- 1945–1946 – Franciszek Kotus-Jankowski
- 1946–1949 – Bolesław Nowicki
- 1949–1950 – Piotr Stolarek

=== Presidents of Presidium of the City National Council of Gdańsk 1950–1973 ===
Between 1950 and 1973 functions of the mayor of Gdańsk and president of the City National Council of Gdańsk were combined into one office.

- 1950–1953 – Piotr Stolarek
- 1953–1954 – Stanisław Schmidt
- 1954–1958 – Julian Cybulski
- 1958–1963 – Stanisław Schmidt
- 1963–1969 – Tadeusz Bejm
- 1969–1973 – Jan Mikołajew

=== Mayors of Gdańsk 1973–1990 ===
Paweł Adamowicz, mayor from 1998 until his assassination in 2019.

- 1973–1977 – Andrzej Kaznowski
- 1977–1981 – Jerzy Młynarczyk
- 1981–1989 – Kazimierz Rynkowski
- 1989–1990 – Jerzy Pasiński

=== Mayors of Gdańsk from 1990 ===
- 1990–1991 – Jacek Starościak
- 1991–1994 – Franciszek Jamroż
- 1994–1998 – Tomasz Posadzki
- 1998–2019 – Paweł Adamowicz
- from 2019 – Aleksandra Dulkiewicz

== Historical mayors or mayors of Gdańsk or Danzig ==
=== Prior to the Teutonic Order ===
Prior to the arrival of the Teutonic Order, Gdańsk, ruled by the dukes of Pomerelia and the dukes of Gdańsk, was governed by sculteti (Schultheiß or sołtys).

- fl. 1220s – Hermann Sapiens (Wise)
- 1260s–1272 – Arnold
- fl. 1273 – Heinrich Pape
- fl. 1303 – Jancho

=== Teutonic Order ===
Note that dates overlap. This is because there were four mayors. First was titled president and had highest power, the rest were named second mayor, third mayor and fourth mayor. After a year the president gave power to the second mayor, and became the fourth mayor. The process repeated itself, interrupted by deaths and elections of new mayors.

- 1342–1347 – Dettloff von der Osten
- 1342–1354 – Henrich Burmeister der Ältere
- 1346–1355 – Steffen von der Osten
- 1354–1374 – Hillebrand Müntzer
- 1356–1360 – Johan von Stein
- 1359–1372 – Johann Wallrabe der Ältere
- 1361–1362 – Casper Bock
- 1362–1390 – Gottschalck Naase
- 1368–1387 – Paul Jann
- 1372–1385 – Johann Wallrabe der Jüngere
- 1379–1386 – Johann Wackaw
- 1381–1384 – Nicklaus Gottsknecht
- 1384–1392 – Herman Rolberg
- 1392–1405 – Reinhold Hittfeld
- 1395–1399 – Lubbert Haacke
- 1399–1404 – Peter Fürstenau
- 1402–1418 – Tideman Huxer
- 1405–1411 – Conrad Letzkau
- 1407–1410 – Peter Vorraht
- 1408–1411 – Arend or Arnold Hecht
- 1411–1417 – Herman Hittfeld
- 1412–1413 – Albrecht Dödorff
- 1413–1430 – Gert von der Becke
- 1415–1416 – Steffen Plötzker
- (before 1436) – Nicklaus Rogge
- 1419–1433 – Johann Beisener
- 1430–1441 – Peter Holste
- 1433–1446 – Lucas Meckelfeld
- 1433–1443 – Heinrich Vorraht
- 1436–1449 – Meinert Cölmer
- 1442–1456 – Martin Cremon
- 1445–1456 – Albrecht Hexer
- 1447–1480 – Reinhold Niederhoff
- 1452–1462 – Herman Stargardt

=== Kingdom of Poland ===
Teutonic Order lost Danzig to Poland after 1454, during the Thirteen Years' War, and by the Second Peace of Toruń

- 1454–1461 – Wilhelm Jordan
- 1457–1461 – Jacob Falcke
- 1461–1475 – Johann von Scheren
- 1462–1478 – Johann von Walde
- 1462–1478 – Johann Veere
- 1470–1483 – Philipp Bischoff
- 1477–1483 – Johann Angermünde
- 1479–1501 – Johann Ferber
- 1483–1485 – Marten Bock
- 1484–1502 – George Buck
- 1484–1490 – Johann Schewecke
- 1489–1505 – Henrich Falcke
- 1492–1501 – Henrich von Süchten
- 1502–1513 – George Mand
- 1503–1512 – Johann Schewecke der Jüngere
- 1504–1513 – Matthias Zimmerman
- 1506–1507 – Antoni Backelman
- 1510–1526 – Eberhard Ferber
- 1513–1525 – Greger Brand
- 1514–1524 – Henrich Wiese
- 1517–1535 – Philipp Bischoff
- 1524–1529 – Matthias Lange
- 1525–1538 – Cordt von Süchten
- 1526–1535 – Edward Niederhoff
- 1526–1554 – Johann von Werden
- 1531–1547 – George Schewecke
- 1536–1539 – Peter Behme
- 1538–1549 – Barthell Brand
- 1540–1560 – Dr. Tiedemann Giese (nephew of the bishop Tiedemann Giese)
- 1550–1554 – Johann Stutte

=== Polish–Lithuanian Commonwealth ===
Polish-Lithuanian Commonwealth begun in 1569 with the Union of Lublin, which transformed the personal union of Poland and Lithuania into a real union and also reintegrated Pomerelia as part of Royal Prussia into the Crown of the Kingdom of Poland

- 1548–1577 – Johann Brandes
- 1555–1588 – Constantin Feber
- 1557–1578 – Johann Proite
- 1558–1576 – Georg Kleefeld
- 1577–1585 – Reinhold Möllner
- 1578–1592 – Georg Rosenberg
- 1581–1619 – Johann von der Linde
- 1586–1602 – Daniel Zierenberg
- 1589–1605 – Constantin Giese
- 1592–1612 – Gerhard Brandes
- 1603–1611 – Johann Thorbecke
- 1605–1614 – Barthell Schachtmann
- 1612–1616 – Andreas Borkman
- 1612–1625 – Johann Speymann
- 1615–1617 – Barthell Brandt
- 1617–1629 – Arnold von Holten
- 1618–1636 – Eggert von Kempen
- 1619–1635 – Valentin von Bodeck
- 1626–1620 – Ernst Kroll
- 1630–1642 – Johann Zierenberg
- 1630–1631 – Adrian von der Linde
- 1632–1654 – Constantin Ferber
- 1636–1644 – Hans Rogge
- 1637–1639 – Johann Ernst Schröder
- 1640–1649 – Nicklas Pahl
- 1643–1644 – Elert von Bobart
- 1645–1646 – Daniel Falcke
- 1645–1682 – Adrian von der Linde
- 1647–1654 – Henrich Freder
- 1650–1665 – Friederich Ehler
- 1655–1663 – Nathanaël Schmieden
- 1655–1673 – George von Bömelen
- 1664–1675 – Nicklas von Bodeck
- 1666–1685 – Gabriel Krumhausen
- 1677–1701 – Christian Schröder
- 1677–1686 – Daniel Proite
- 1683–1700 – Barbiel Schuhmann
- 1686–1704 – Constantin Ferber
- 1687–1691 – Constantin Ferber
- 1692–1707 – Johann Ernst Schmieden
- 1700–1707 – Constantin Ferber
- 1702–1707 – Reinhold Wieder
- 1704–1722 – Andreas Borkman
- 1707–1716 – Friedrich Gottlieb Engelcke
- 1708–1712 – Joachim Hoyge
- 1708–1740 – Gabriel von Bömeln
- 1712–1721 – Ernst von der Linde
- 1716–1710 – Carl Ernst Bauer
- 1720–1745 – Johann Gottfried von Disseldorff
- 1722–1720 – Salomon Gabriel Schumann
- 1723–1734 – Gottfried von Bentzmann
- 1730–1739 – Carl Groddeck
- 1735–1757 – Johann Wahl
- 1740–1753 – Carl Gottlieb Ehler
- 1741–1746 – Joachim Jacob Schwacher
- 1746–1748 – Johann Carl Schwartzwald
- 1746–1755 – Nathanael Gottfried Ferber
- 1750–1753 – Fridrich Krüger
- 1754 – Christian Gabriel von Schröder
- 1754 – Michael Schmidt
- 1756 – Johann Kenner
- ? – Johann Ernst von der Linde
- 1762–1776 – Gottlieb G. Weickhmann
- 1763–1767 – Daniel Gralath
- 1777 – Gottfried Schwartz
- 1787 – Johann von Bentzmann
- 1790 – Zernecke
- 1793 – Eduard Friedrich von Conradi

=== Kingdom of Prussia ===
- 1794 – von Lindenow

=== Free City of Danzig (Napoleonic) ===
- 1807–1808 – Carl Friedrich von Gralath
- 1808–1810 – Gottlieb Hufeland
- 1810–1814 – Johann Willhelm Wernsdorff
- 1814–1849 – Joachim Heinrich von Weickhmann

=== Kingdom of Prussia and German Empire ===
- 1850–1862 – Carl August von Groddeck
- 1863–1891 – Leopold von Winter
- 1891–1896 – Dr. Karl Adolf Baumbach
- 1896–1902 – Dr. Clemens von Delbrück
- 1903–1910 – Heinrich Otto Ehlers
- 1910–1919 – Heinrich Heinrich Scholtz

=== Free City of Danzig ===
Free City of Danzig created by the Treaty of Versailles

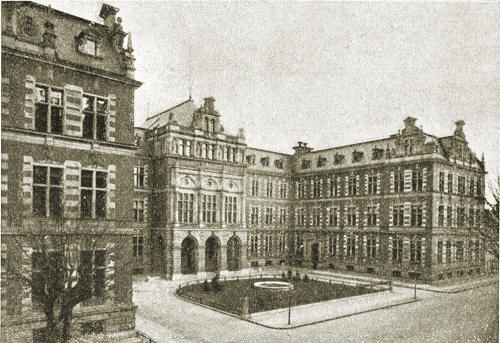
Senate of the Free City of Danzig

- 1920–1931 – Dr. Heinrich Sahm (since 1920 President of Senate)
- 1931–1933 – Ernst Ziehm (President of Senate)
- 1933–1934 – Hermann Rauschning (President of Senate)
- 1934–1939 – Arthur Greiser (President of Senate)
- 1939 – Albert Forster (Head of State)

=== World War II ===
Free City occupied by Nazi Germany and incorporated into the Reichsgau Danzig-West Prussia

- 1939–1945 – Georg Lippke

== Speakers of the municipal legislature ==
=== Presidents of the Volkstag (1920-1939) ===
- 1920–1921: Wilhelm Reinhard
- 1921-1921: Adalbert Mathaei
- 1921–1923: Adolf Treichel (first term)
- 1923–1924: Julius Gehl (first term)
- 1924–1926: Adolf Treichel (second term)
- 1926–1928: Alfred Semrau
- 1928–1930: Fritz Spill
- 1930–1931: Julius Gehl (second term)
- 1931–1933: Wilhelm von Wnuck (first term)
- 1933-1933: Franz Potrykus
- 1933–1936: Wilhelm von Wnuck (second term)
- 1937–1939: Edmund Beyl

=== Chairpersons of the City National Council of Gdańsk 1945–1950 ===
1945–1948 – Alfred Kossakowski
1948–1949 – Leon Srebrnik
1949–1950 – Bolesław Gemza

=== Presidents of the Presidium of the City National Council of Gdańsk 1950–1973 ===
Between 1950 and 1973 functions of the mayor of Gdańsk and chairperson of the City National Council of Gdańsk were combined into one office.

- 1950–1953 – Piotr Stolarek
- 1953–1954 – Stanisław Schmidt
- 1954–1958 – Julian Cybulski
- 1958–1963 – Stanisław Schmidt
- 1963–1969 – Tadeusz Bejm
- 1969–1973 – Jan Mikołajew

=== Chairpersons of the City National Council of Gdańsk 1973–1990 ===
- 1973–1977 – Adam Nowotnik
- 1977–1981 – Jarosław Polski
- 1981–1984 – Wiesław Julian Gruszkowski
- 1984–1986 – Eugeniusz Wójcik
- 1986–1990 – Janusz Lewiński

=== Chairpersons of the City Council of Gdańsk from 1990 ===
- 1990 – Franciszek Jamroż
- 1990–1994 – Andrzej Januszajtis
- 1994–1998 – Paweł Adamowicz
- 1998–2001 – Elżbieta Grabarek-Bartoszewicz
- 2001–2018 – Bogdan Oleszek
- from 2018 – Agnieszka Owczarczak

== See also ==
- List of Gdańsk aristocratic families
- History of Gdańsk
- Timeline of Gdańsk
