= Andrzej Kaznowski =

Polish politician (1935–2023)

Mayor of Gdańsk
- In office 13 December 1973 – 15 September 1977
- Preceded by: Jan Nikołajew (as president of the City Council of Gdańsk)
- Succeeded by: Jerzy Młynarczyk

Personal details
- Born: 23 December 1935; Gdynia, Poland
- Died: 12 August 2023 (aged 87)
- Political party: PZPR

Andrzej Kaznowski (23 December 1935 – 12 August 2023) was a Polish Communist politician who was the mayor of Gdańsk from 1973 to 1977.

In 1964, he graduated from Gdańsk College of Education (later the University of Gdańsk). He became a member of the Polish United Workers' Party in 1960 and later held a number of bureaucratic positions in the city. Kaznowski was the mayor of Gdańsk from 13 December 1973 to 15 September 1977. He was the first mayor of the city after the city council split the offices of mayor and the presidium of the National City Council. He began the twin city program between Gdańsk and Bremen in West Germany, the first of its kind in Poland. He was succeeded by Jerzy Młynarczyk. He later worked in a number of diplomatic positions before going into private enterprise.

Kaznowski died on 12 August 2023, at the age of 87.
