= Aleksandra Dulkiewicz =

Polish lawyer and acting mayor of Gdańsk

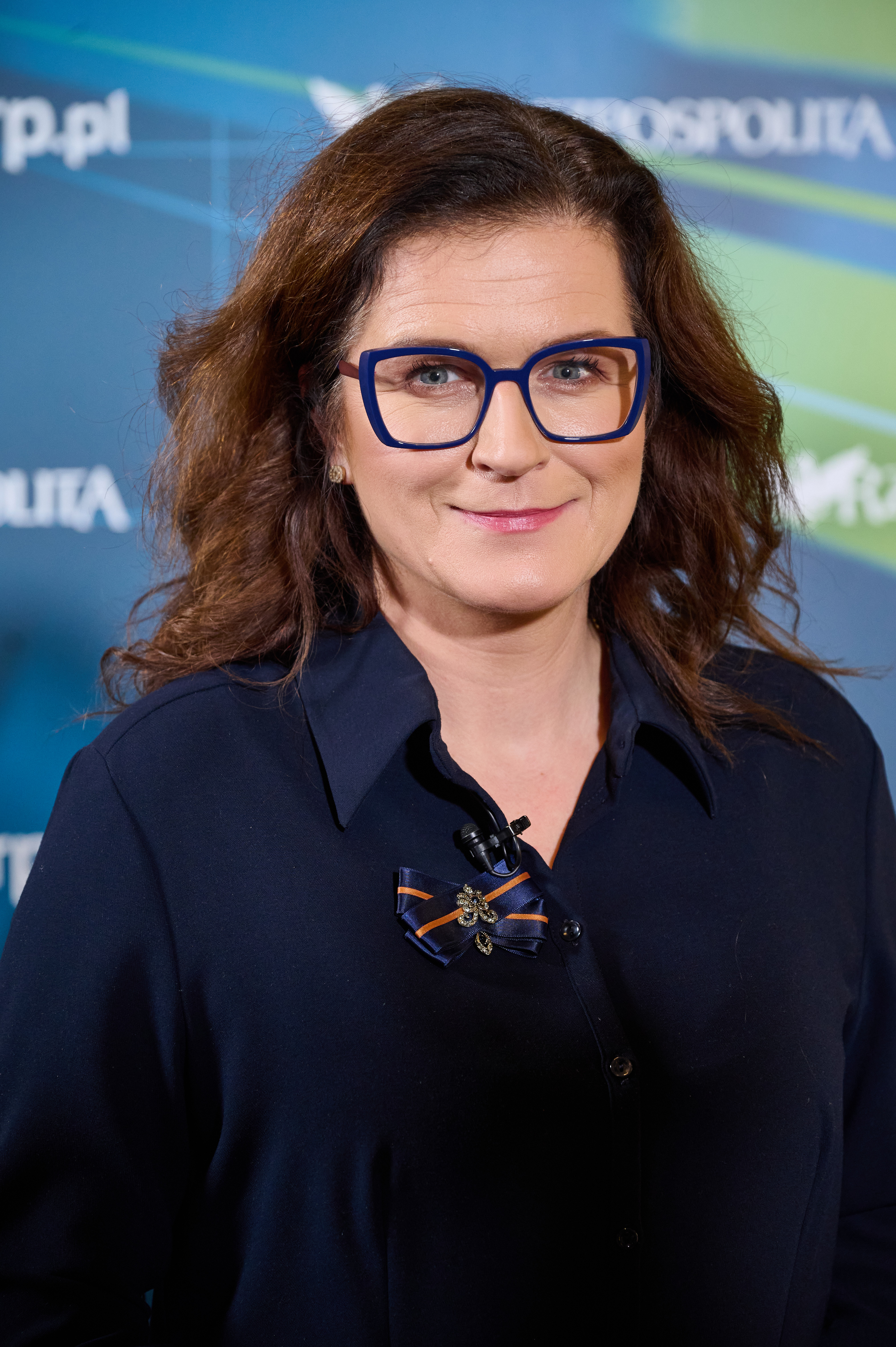
- Dulkiewicz in 2024

Mayor of Gdańsk
- Incumbent
- Assumed office 14 January 2019
- Preceded by: Paweł Adamowicz

Personal details
- Born: 10 July 1979 (age 47) Gdańsk, Poland
- Party: Everything for Gdańsk
- Other political affiliations: Yes! For Poland
- Children: Zofia (b. 2008)
- Education: University of Gdańsk

Aleksandra Maria Dulkiewicz ([alɛkˈsandra dulkʲɛvit͡ʂ]; born 10 July 1979) is a Polish lawyer and politician serving as the city mayor of Gdańsk since 11 March 2019.

== Life and career ==
In 1994, she graduated from The Primary School No. 50 named after Emilia Plater in Gdańsk. In 1999 she graduated from the III Liceum Ogólnokształcące im. Bohaterów Westerplatte w Gdańsku (a high school). In 2006 she graduated from the University of Gdańsk in law. From 2004 to 2005 she studied at the faculty of Law of University of Salzburg.

She acted in the Association of Young Conservatives and the Conservative People's Party. In 1995 she participated in the mayor campaign of Hanna Gronkiewicz-Waltz. Since 2000, she has worked in the Gdansk AREOPAG organisation. In 2006 she was assistant of the mayor of Gdansk Paweł Adamowicz. She was working in the European Solidarity Centre in the 2009–2014 period and in the Gdansk Economic Development Agency in the 2014–2017 period. She also participated in the preparation of UEFA Euro 2012 in Gdańsk.

In 2010 and 2014 she was elected as a city councillor in Gdańsk, being a candidate of the Civic Platform party, in 2014 she became the leader of the Civic Platform club in the municipal council. From 20 March 2017 to 14 January 2019, she was deputy city mayor of Gdańsk responsible for the economic policy. During the local elections in 2018, she was the campaign manager of Adamowicz (she suspended her membership in Civic Platform then, which later expired). In this election, she received re-election in the city council, being a candidate of the Committee Everything for Gdańsk.

On 14 January 2019, after the assassination of Adamowicz, she assumed the position of an acting city mayor of Gdańsk. On 15 January 2019, the Prime Minister Mateusz Morawiecki confirmed that she would continue as the acting city mayor until the election of a new one.

On 22 January 2019, she ran for the mayoralty of the city of Gdańsk in the early elections held on 3 March 2019, and was elected with the 82% of the votes. She started her term on 11 March 2019, as first woman on this post. In 2024, she was re-elected as Mayor of Gdańsk in the 2024 Polish local elections winning 62.3% of the votes.

== Personal life ==
Dulkiewicz is a single mother with a daughter named Zofia (born 2008). She is a Roman Catholic.

== See also ==
- Politics of Poland
