= Assassination of Paweł Adamowicz =

2019 murder in Gdańsk, Poland

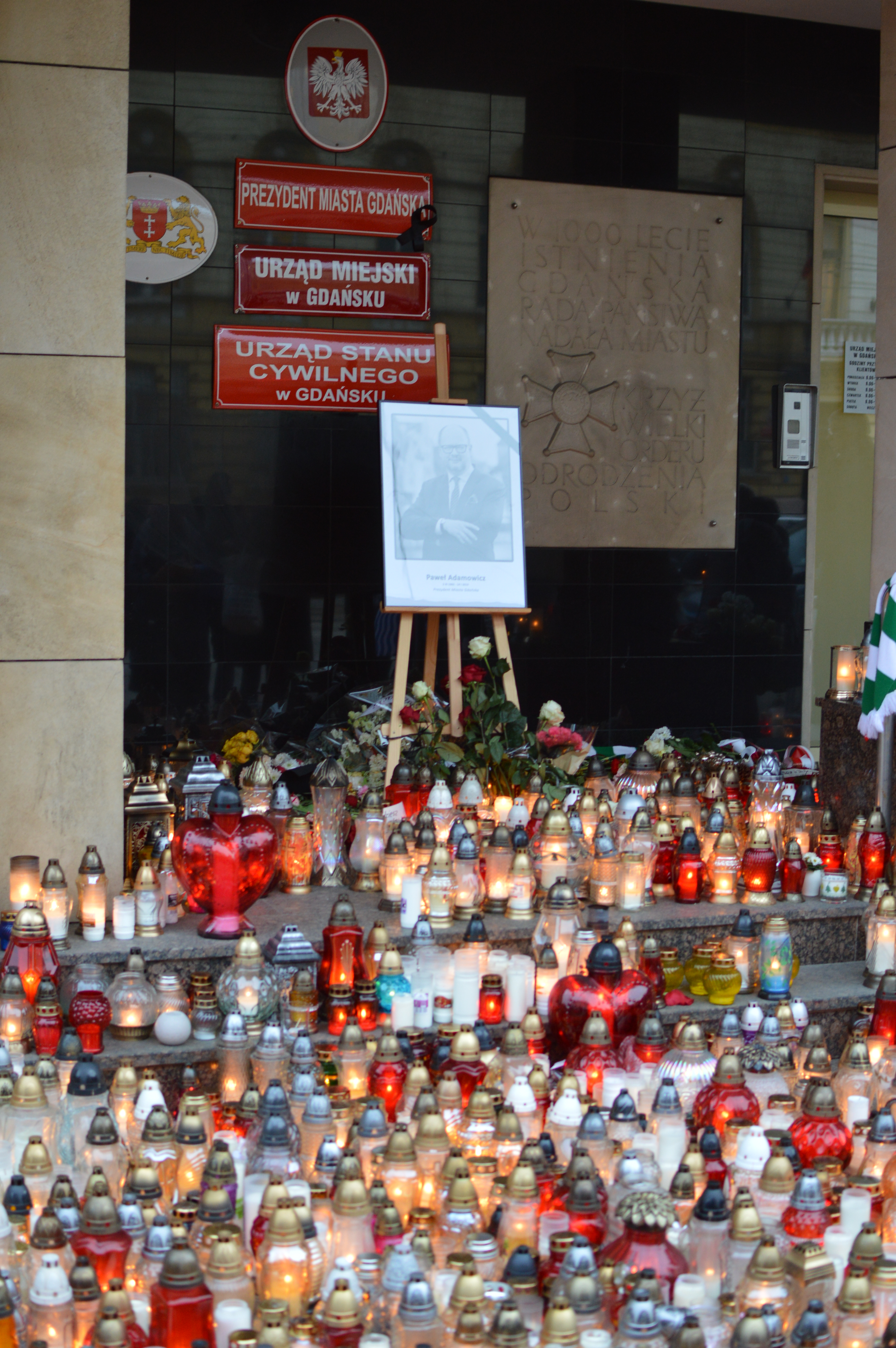
- Gdańsk City Hall, two days after the assassination

- Location of the assassination
- Location: 54°20′57″N 18°38′50″E; Targ Węglowy, Gdańsk
- Date: 13 January 2019; 8:00 p.m. (UTC+01:00)
- Target: Paweł Adamowicz
- Attack type: Assassination by stabbing
- Deaths: 1
- Perpetrator: Stefan Wilmont
- Motive: Perceived personal injustice blamed on the Civic Platform

Paweł Adamowicz, the mayor of Gdańsk, Poland, was fatally stabbed on 13 January 2019 while onstage during a local public event marking the 27th finale of the Great Orchestra of Christmas Charity, a nationwide Polish charity fundraiser, which was taking place in the city's Targ Węglowy square. The attacker, a spectator named Stefan Wilmont, entered the stage without obstruction and, following the stabbing, made a statement into a microphone citing Adamowicz's political affiliation as a motivation for the act. The incident – an open assassination of a sitting public official – was unprecedented in Poland's history since World War II, according to the judge passing the sentence in the attacker's resulting murder case, and it shocked the Polish community. It received significant news coverage from both national and international media.

== Attacker ==
The attacker, Stefan Wilmont, was a 27-year-old inhabitant of Oliwa, a district of Gdańsk. He had been involved in criminal activities from a young age and was characterized by ruthless aggression, as well as drug abuse.

Between 8 May and 12 June 2013, Wilmont perpetrated three robberies against credit union stands and one Credit Agricole bank in the Gdańsk district of Zaspa. He stole 15,920 zł (US$5037) in total, with only 2,550 zł (US$807) being returned from the last robbery, during which he was stopped by police. He said that he spent the rest of the money on "taxis, food and casinos", as well as a trip to the Canary Islands. For these crimes, he was sentenced on 29 May 2014, to 5 years and 6 months in prison as well as a 4,000 zł (US$1268) fine. He was released on 8 December 2018.

While in prison, Wilmont was reportedly diagnosed with paranoid schizophrenia and was sent to therapy and also provided medication—once his mental health did not show signs of improving, he was given ambulatory care. He refused to take any medication a few months later, although according to the doctors who were taking care of him at that time, he was not in a good mental state.

Shortly before the end of his sentence on 30 November 2018, Stefan Wilmont's mother reported to the police that her son's mental state was bad and that he had been harmed by the judge's decision to send him to prison. He blamed the fact that he was in prison on local politicians. She stated that he attacked with a dummy weapon and not with a real firearm. The mother also reported that he would do "something spectacular" that would "let everyone know about the harm that had been done to him". This information was given to the Prison Service, Poland's primary prison-guarding service; however, the fact that the information was given by Stefan's mother was excluded, which led to only talks with Wilmont and consultation with a therapist being done, which did not find the potential of a threat from Wilmont.

== Assassination ==
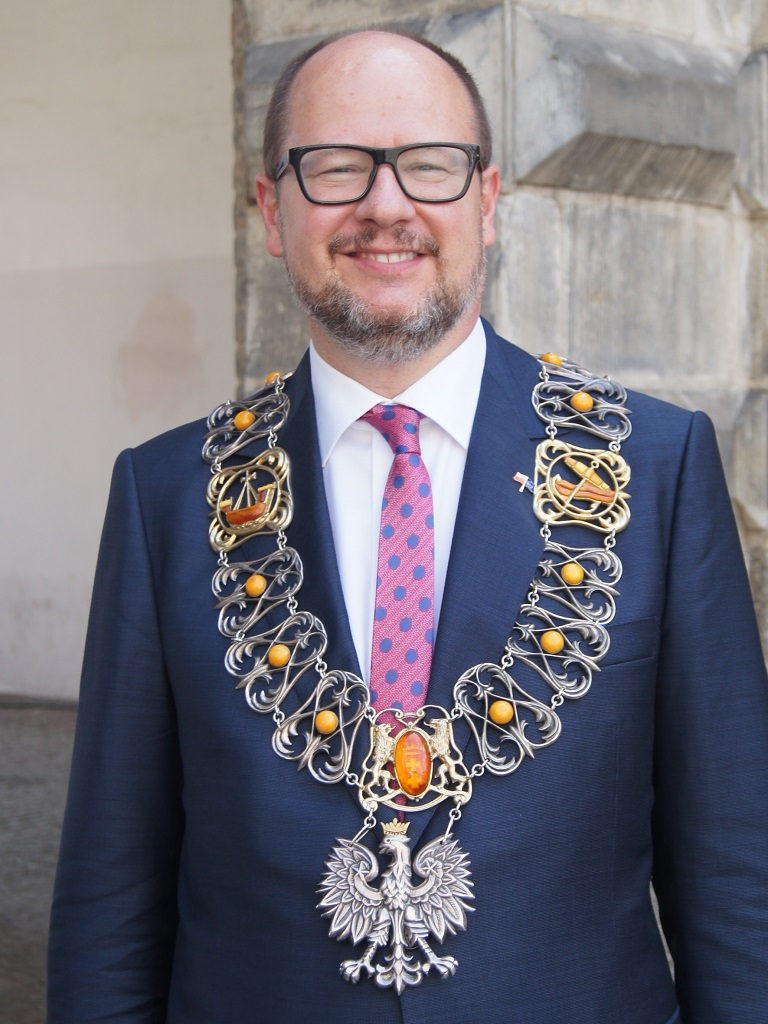
Adamowicz in 2018

On 13 January 2019, the 27th Finale of the Great Orchestra of Christmas Charity, a Polish charity event happening annually every winter, was being hosted countrywide in Poland. As a celebration of the orchestra's final, the Regional Volunteer Center in Gdańsk organized the charity concert "Gdańsk For the Orchestra" (Polish: Gdańsk Dla Orkiestry) in the city's historical coal market, Targ Węglowy, starting at 3:00 p.m. CET (UTC+01:00).

During the evening, Mayor of Gdańsk Paweł Adamowicz came onstage and gave a speech in which he thanked the supporters of the Great Orchestra. At 8:00 p.m., while the people onstage were counting down to a sparkler show called the "Little Light To the Sky" (Polish: Światełko do nieba), Wilmont ran up to Adamowicz and stabbed him three times with a knife. Following the attack, Stefan took one of the microphones and declared:

Hello! Hello! My name is Stefan Wilmont! I was imprisoned while innocent! I was imprisoned while innocent! The Civic Platform tortured me! That's why Adamowicz died!

Shortly after Wilmont gave the speech, the technical crew escorted him off-stage. He was then transferred to event security guards, who in turn transferred him to the police.

=== Post-attack surgery ===
Adamowicz was rushed to a local hospital. At 2:20 a.m. the next day, doctor Tomasz Stefaniak stated the following about his status:

The patient [Adamowicz] is still alive. His wounds are very severe—a serious heart injury, a wound in the diaphragm, and plenty of wounds in the abdominal cavity. His state is very, very rough.

Adamowicz relied on blood transfusions while at the hospital, with Stefaniak notifying the public that 41 units of blood had been used to keep Adamowicz alive during the same announcement. After undergoing a five-hour-long operation, Adamowicz survived the surgery, but required artificial ventilation devices to stay alive. At 12:30 p.m., during a press conference, Adamowicz' secretary Magdalena Skorupka-Kaczmarek shared the news of his death to the public.

== Reactions ==
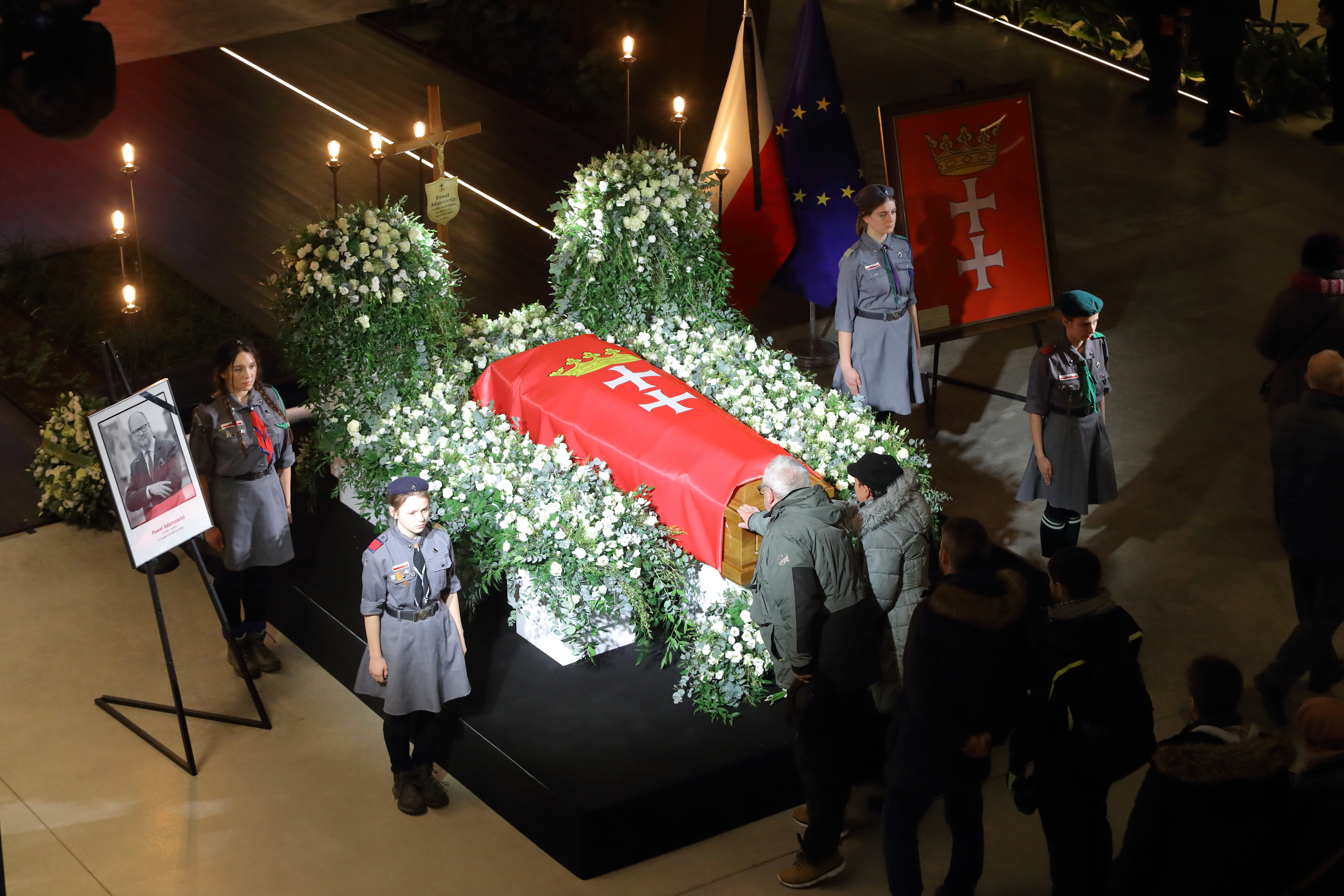
Polish Scouts from the ZHR guarding the coffin of Adamowicz at the European Solidarity Centre prior to the funeral

=== Mourning ===
On 14 January, shortly after Adamowicz' death, President of Poland Andrzej Duda declared that the day of the mayor's burial would be a national day of mourning. Three days later, it was specified that the time of mourning would occur from 5 p.m. on 18 January to 7 p.m. on 19 January.

On 15 January, during a press conference, deputy mayor of Gdańsk Aleksandra Dulkiewicz announced a that period of mourning would be occurring from 15 to 19 January within the city limits. Around the same time, mayor of Warsaw Rafał Trzaskowski declared a period of mourning in the capital as well—large parties were cancelled and flags located on government buildings were lowered to half-mast.

Multiple other cities were involved in events mourning the loss of Adamowicz, including Sosnowiec, Sopot and Poznań.

=== Rallies and marches against violence ===
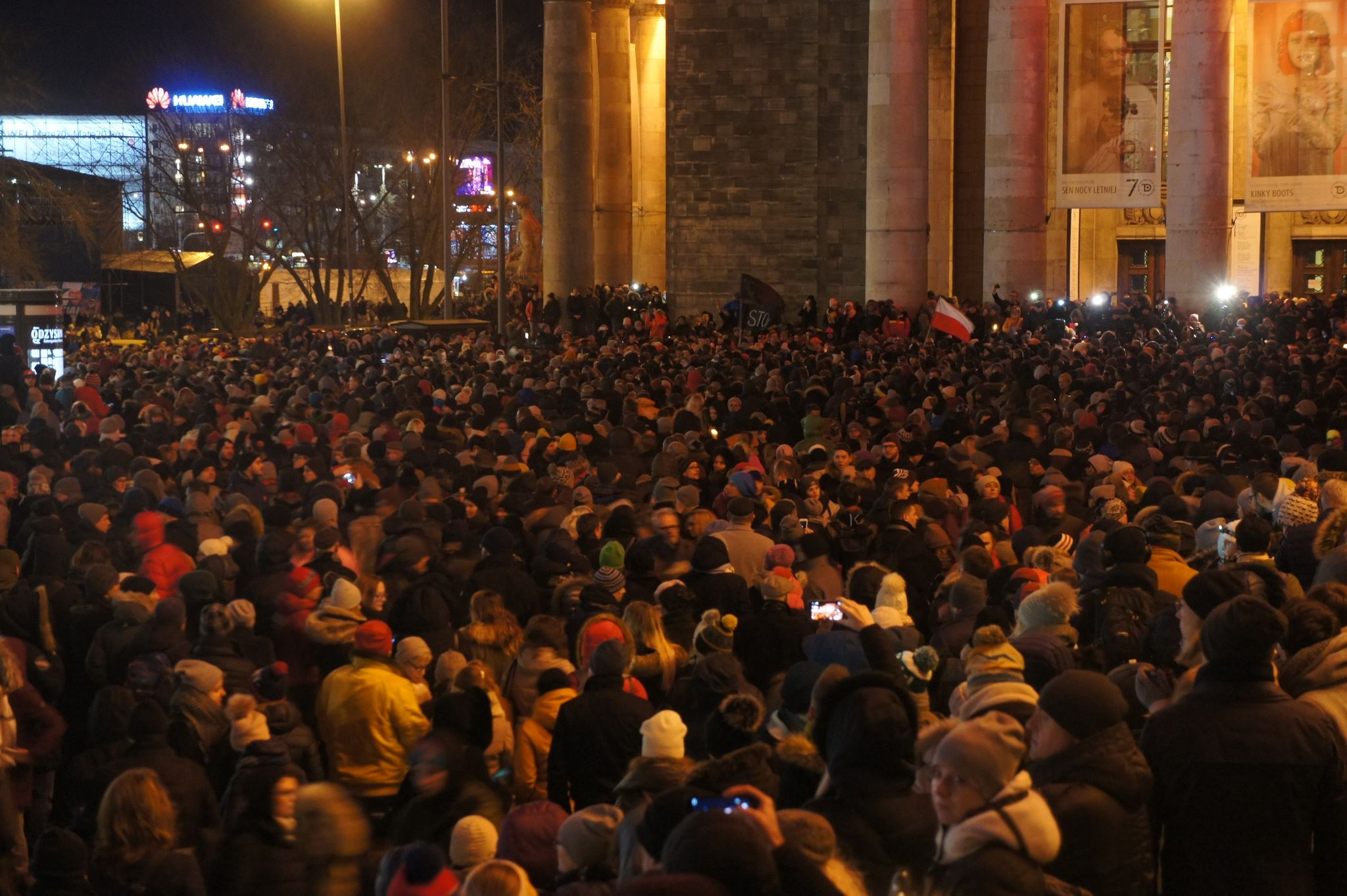
Demonstration against violence in Warsaw following the assassination of Adamowicz

On the day after the assassination, a rally occurred in Gdańsk's Long Market which was previously planned to be a rally against hatred and violence but, after the murder of Paweł Adamowicz, became a public meeting meant to commemorate the loss of the city's mayor. Approximately 16,000 people participated in the rally, including former President of the European Council Donald Tusk, Vice Marshal of the Senate of Poland Bogdan Borusewicz, voivode of Pomerania Dariusz Drelich and former President of Poland Lech Wałęsa. Similar rallies happened in other cities, such as Warsaw, Kraków, Poznań, Katowice, Jasło and Częstochowa.

On the same day that the rally in the Long Market was hosted, St. Mary's Church in Gdańsk held an ecumenical service which was attended by the representatives of various religions and Christian denominations in Gdańsk.

=== Great Orchestra of Christmas Charity response ===
On 14 January, founder and chairman of the Great Orchestra of Christmas Charity Jerzy Owsiak resigned from his role due to allegations of his charity being responsible for the death of Paweł Adamowicz. Five days later, on 19 January, he returned to his role after receiving public support.

=== Other comments ===
The assassination was met with condemnation from multiple people and organizations both in Poland and abroad. Those who lamented the attack included President of Poland Andrzej Duda, former President of the European Council Donald Tusk, former President of Poland Lech Wałęsa, Mayor of London Sadiq Khan and Vice President of the European Commission Frans Timmermans.

On 16 January, the wife of Paweł Adamowicz, Magdalena Adamowicz, said the following regarding the assassination during an interview with Gazeta Wyborcza:

I believe that Paweł had two wishes. First of all, that Jerzy Owsiak, despite these tragic events, remains the chair of the Great Orchestra of Christmas Charity. Second of all, that we continue his work, which includes the association "Everything for Gdańsk"—it has 50 apolitical goals to live up to, it is pro-citizenry and it works for the people. From this comes the family's request to not bring flowers and grave lanterns to his Saturday funeral, but to donate to and support the organizations that were close to [my] husband. Volunteers with cans will be in churches and all around them. That is my will and I know that it would be my husband's.

The murder of Paweł Adamowicz, due to the rash comments made by the attacker against the Civic Platform, sparked a debate in Polish media regarding the increasing aggression which could be seen in political discourse and also about hate speech, especially in the context of the threats and insults towards Adamowicz in the past months and the insufficient reaction of government institutions to such happenings. Some pointed out the many hateful comments from politicians opposed to Adamowicz and media who favoured their political views.

==== Telewizja Polska criticisms of Paweł Adamowicz ====
Polish public TV broadcaster Telewizja Polska (TVP) had fiercely criticized Paweł Adamowicz since the Law and Justice party came to power in Poland in 2015. Adamowicz' family, as well as multiple journalists, called such activities smear campaigns. Magdalena Adamowicz stated that Telewizja Polska's broadcasts contributed to the death of her husband.

Following Paweł Adamowicz' death in January 2019, mayor of Poznań Jacek Jaśkowiak stated that the actions of the "full of perfidious propagandists and hateful materials" Telewizja Polska had an influence on Paweł's assassination. Jaśkowiak called TVP's programming "gutter". In February 2019, TVP filed a lawsuit against Jaśkowiak, demanding apologies. Jaśkowiak declared that he would not apologize to the TV channel, and in September 2020, TVP lost the case to Jaśkowiak after a year and 7 months.

Also in January 2019, musician Krzysztof Skiba publicly held Jacek Kurski, then chairman of Telewizja Polska, morally accountable for the murder of Paweł Adamowicz, saying in a Polsat News interview that "the media openly slandered the mayor of Gdańsk and we now suffer the consequences". Kurski sued Skiba for the statements, however, on 23 June 2020, the Warsaw Court of Second Instance declared that Skiba had the right to use those words.
