= Franciszek Kotus-Jankowski =

Polish politician (1891–1958)

Mayor of Gdańsk
- In office 3 April 1945 – 27 May 1946
- Preceded by: Georg Lippke (as high mayor); Friedrich Marzian (as mayor)
- Succeeded by: Bolesław Nowicki

Personal details
- Born: Franciszek Kotus; 28 January 1891 Warsaw, Kingdom of Poland, Russian Empire
- Died: 19 January 1958 (aged 66) Gdańsk, Poland
- Resting place: Srebrzysko Central Cemetery, Gdańsk, Poland
- Party: Social Democracy of the Kingdom of Poland and Lithuania (until 1918); Communist Party of Poland (1919–1939); Polish Workers' Party (from 1942)

Franciszek Kotus-Jankowski (Polish: [franˈt͡ɕi.ʂɛk ˈkɔ.tus jaŋˈkɔf.ski]; 28 January 1891 – 19 January 1958) was a Polish politician and communist activist. From 1945 to 1946, he was the mayor of Gdańsk, Poland, as a member of the Polish Workers' Party. He was also a Marxist revolutionary activist, being a member of the Social Democracy of the Kingdom of Poland and Lithuania, and a participant of the October Revolution in 1917 in the Russian Empire

== Biography ==
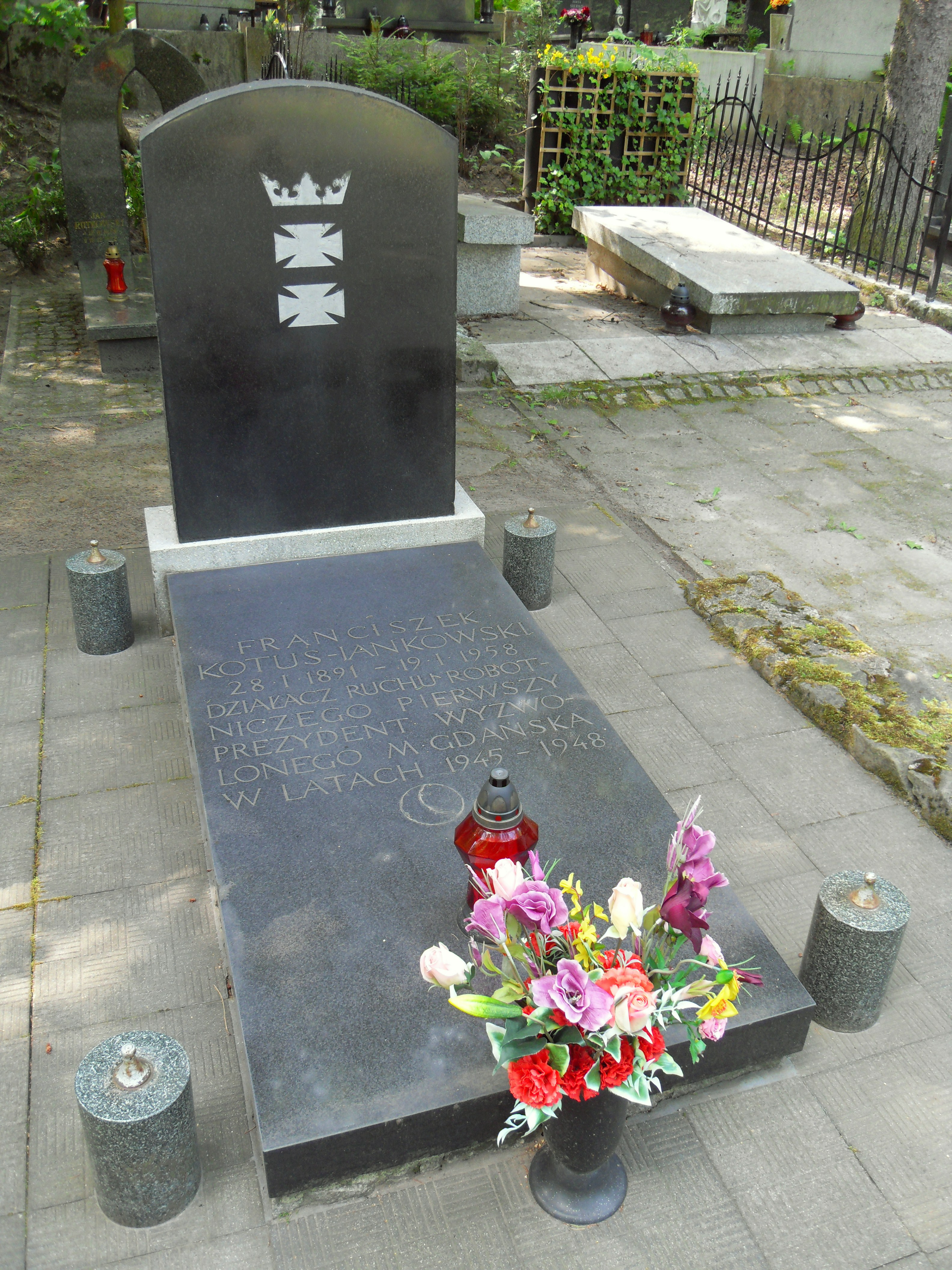
The grave of Franciszek Kotus-Jankowski.

He was born as Franciszek Kotus on 28 January 1891 in Warsaw in the Kingdom of Poland, which was a part of the Russian Empire.

He was a member of the Social Democracy of the Kingdom of Poland and Lithuania, a Marxist political party. He also participated in revolutionary activities, for which he was arrested on several occasions, and in 1911, he was sentenced to decoration to Vyatka Governorate. He was also held in prisions in Warsaw and Saratov. During the First World War, he worked for the Council for Assistance to War Victims, and was also active in the activities of the Social Democracy of the Kingdom of Poland and Lithuania in the Saint Petersburg Governorate. In 1917, he fought in the October Revolution on the insurrectionist side. During his revolutionary activities, he used pseudonyms Jankowski and Stefan, later adopting the former as part of his surname, as Kotus-Jankowski.

During the interwar period, Kotus-Jankowski worked in the Sickness Insurance Fund and the Social Insurance Institution. In January 1919, he joined the Communist Party of Poland. He was also a board member of the Warsaw division comittiee of the International Red Aid.

From 3 April 1945 to 27 May 1946, Kotus-Jankowski was the mayor of Gdańsk, as a member of the Polish Workers' Party. After resigning from the office, he was the head director of the factory Państwowe Zakłady Samochodowe Nr 6 (lit. 'State Car Workshops no. 6') in Gdynia until 1948. Later, he returned to working in the Social Insurance Institution, becoming a manager of one its divisions in Gdańsk.

Kotus-Jankowski died 19 January 1958 in Gdańsk. He was buried in the section for distinguished individuals at the Srebrzysko Central Cemetery in Gdańsk.

== Awards and decorations ==
- Order of the Banner of Labour, 2nd class
- Knight's Cross of the Order of the Banner of Labour
