= Adrian von der Linde =

Prussian politician (c. 1610–1682)

Adrian von der Linde (c. 1610 – 1682) — Patrician and Lord Mayor of Gdańsk.

== See also ==
- Administrations of Danzig before April 1945
