= Jerzy Pasiński =

Polish politician (1947–2025)

Mayor of Gdańsk
- In office 23 November 1989 – 10 July 1990
- Preceded by: Kazimierz Rynkowski
- Succeeded by: Jacek Starościak

Personal details
- Born: 18 April 1947 Bydgoszcz, Poland
- Died: 4 March 2025 (aged 77) Gdańsk, Poland
- Party: PZPR
- Spouse: Daniela (married 1975)
- Children: 3
- Education: Gdańsk University of Technology
- Occupation: State Official, Mechanical Engineer, Manager, Academic
- Awards: Centennial Independence Medal (2018)

Jerzy Witold Pasiński (18 April 1947 – 4 March 2025) was a Polish Communist politician who was the mayor of Gdańsk from 1989 to 1990. He was notably the last mayor of Gdańsk from the Polish United Workers' Party, as well as the first mayor after the establishment of the Third Polish Republic.

== Early life and education ==
Jerzy Pasiński was born on 18 April 1947 in Bydgoszcz to Bruno and Anna (née Piechowska). He completed his secondary technical education at the Mechanical and Electrical Technical School in Bydgoszcz in 1966. In 1972, he graduated from the Faculty of Mechanical Engineering at the Gdańsk University of Technology. Eager to enhance his managerial skills, he attended various courses, including those organized by the Gdańsk Foundation for Managerial Education and the French Institute of Management in Warsaw. In 1985, he earned a PhD in the field of mechanics and tribology, and his academic career included work as a researcher and adjunct professor at his alma mater as well as a stint at the Institute of Fluid-Flow Machinery of the Polish Academy of Sciences (1988–1989). Over his career, he authored 12 patents and published several works in mechanics and tribology.

== Career ==
Pasiński joined the Polish United Workers' Party (PZPR) in 1968 in Gdańsk. Between 1979 and 1990, he served as vice-chairman and later chairman of the Central Union of Housing Cooperatives. Additionally, he was a councilor in the City national council in Gdańsk from 1984 until 1990, spanning two terms.

With the changing political landscape in Poland, Pasiński was appointed Mayor of Gdansk on 23 November 1989—a period marked by significant social and political upheaval. His tenure, which ended on 10 July 1990, witnessed events such as the occupation of the PZPR Regional Committee building by protesting citizens.

After his mayoral term, Pasiński transitioned to various leadership roles in the economic sector. Between 1990 and 1991, he was the general director of the Gdańsk Chamber of Private Industry and Trade. He later served as the president of the Gdańsk Chamber of Commerce (1994–1996) and as vice-president of the Pomeranian Chamber of Commerce and Industry (1996–1998). In 1991, he became the commercial director of PPH Marżal, and subsequently, he was the president of the Gdańsk International Fair until 1999. From 1999 to 2002, he acted as the deputy president of the Gdańsk Social Housing Association. Pasiński further held positions as CEO of Rudoport (a company within the ArcelorMittal Poland group), a special representative for innovation for the Pomeranian Voivode (1999–2000), and, in 2003, as the deputy head of the Office for War Veterans and Repressed Persons. He was also active in Rotary International’s Tri-City branch and sat on several supervisory boards. He retired in 2012.

== Personal life and death ==
In 1975, Jerzy Pasiński married Daniela, and together they had three children. His contributions to the fields of engineering, public administration, and economic development were recognized in 2018 when he received the Centennial Independence Medal from the Mayor of Gdańsk for his services to Poland, Pomerania, and Gdańsk.

Pasiński’s multifaceted career as both an academic and a public servant left a lasting impact on Gdańsk and the broader region during a time of transformative change in Poland. He died in Gdansk on 4 March 2025, at the age of 77.
