= Franciszek Jamroż =

Polish politician (1943–2023)

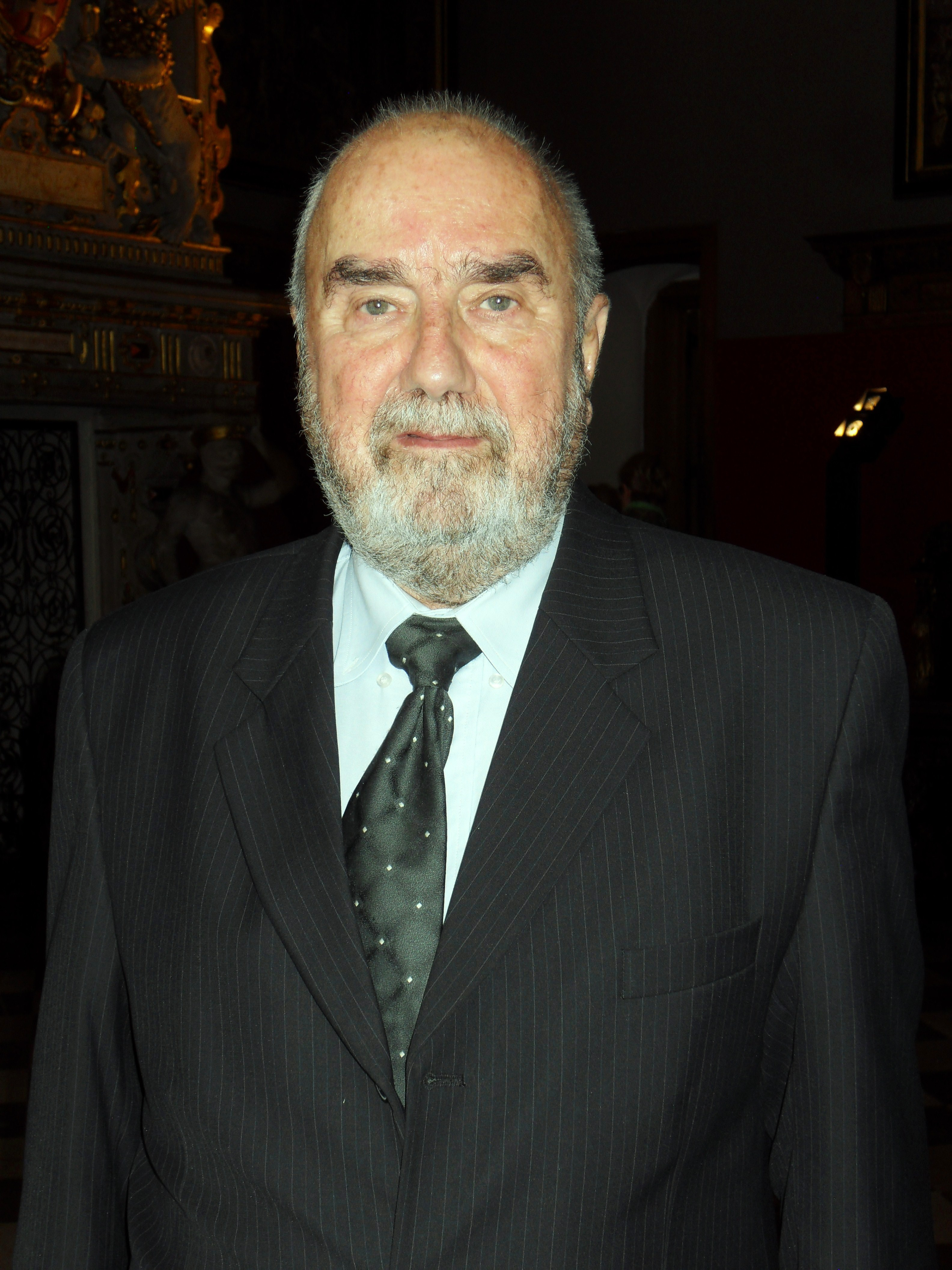

Mayor of Gdańsk
- In office 14 June 1991 – 7 July 1994
- Preceded by: Jacek Starościak
- Succeeded by: Tomasz Posadzki

Chairman of the City Council of Gdańsk
- In office 1990
- Preceded by: Janusz Lewiński (as President of National City Council of Gdańsk)
- Succeeded by: Andrzej Januszajtis

Personal details
- Born: 19 May 1943 Stalowa Wola, General Government (now Poland)
- Died: 25 January 2023 (aged 79) Gdańsk, Poland
- Party: Centre Agreement
- Spouse: Daniela Jurkowlaniec (married 1969)
- Relations: Brothers: Ryszard (b. 1937), Jerzy (b. 1939), and Stanisław (b. 1945); Sister: Alicja (b. 1947)
- Children: Małgorzata (b. 1970); Joanna (b. 1971)
- Parent(s): Stefan Jamroż; Helena
- Education: Gdańsk University of Technology
- Occupation: Engineer, Union and Local Government Activist, Politician

Franciszek Jamroż (19 May 1943 – 25 January 2023) was a Polish politician who was the mayor of Gdańsk, Poland from 1991 to 1994. He was charged with corruption and bribery and was imprisoned.

== Early life and education ==
Franciszek Jamroż attended Primary School No. 23 in Gdańsk-Oliwa from 1950 to 1957 before enrolling in the Telecommunications Technical School (Technikum Łączności) from 1957 to 1962. In 1968, he graduated from the Faculty of Electronics at the Gdańsk University of Technology with a specialization in automation, earning the title of Master of Engineering. Later, between 1995 and 1999, he completed internal audit training for quality assurance systems and received certifications from the Polish Center for Research and Certification.

== Professional career ==
Jamroż began his professional career in 1968 as a designer at the Gdańsk Electronic Works Unimor. He subsequently worked at the Radiowe Zakłady Radmor from 1971 to 1977 as a workshop manager, and later at the Institute of Communications in Gdańsk (1977–1984), where he headed the Construction and Workshop Department. In 1980, he led the “Solidarność” Shop Committee at the Institute of Communications and co-founded the Nationwide Coordinating Commission of the Institute of Communications in Warsaw. He became involved in the early Solidarność movement as a delegate at the first congress of the Gdańsk Region in 1981, and later served on its board.

== Political career ==
Following the political changes in Poland, Jamroż emerged as a prominent local figure. In 1989, he directed the Program Committee and served as vice-chairman of the Gdańsk Civic Committee. In 1990, he was appointed Chairman of the Provincial Commission for the Verification of Militia and Security Service Employees. That same year, he was elected as a city councilor in Gdańsk and was chosen as the chairman of the city council during the inaugural session of the new municipal authorities on 5 June 1990, though he resigned from this position on 11 December 1990.

On 14 June 1991, Jamroż assumed the office of Mayor of Gdansk serving until 7 July 1994. During his tenure, he oversaw significant local administrative reforms in the early post-communist era.

== Post-Mayoral Career and Legal Issues ==
After leaving office, Jamroż worked in the private sector. From 1994 to 1998, he held various managerial roles at the company NORD, including positions as general director, production director, and director for development. In 2008, he retired from active professional life.

In 2004, Jamroż was convicted alongside his deputy, Dariusz Śmiałkowski, for accepting over 48,000 Deutsche Marks from the German company SPO GmbH in 1994. The payments were in exchange for the acquisition of technology and materials by the municipal Gdańsk Heating Enterprise and for signing a contract for the insulation of buildings in the Stogi district. He was sentenced to three years in prison and fined 20,000 PLN, and he served his sentence accordingly.

== Personal life and death ==
Franciszek Jamroż was born to Stefan Jamroż, an economist, and Helena (née Popkiewicz), a religion teacher. He had three brothers. Ryszard (b. 1937), Jerzy (b. 1939), and Stanisław (b. 1945)—as well as a sister, Alicja (b. 1947). In 1969, he married Daniela Jurkowlaniec; the couple had two daughters, Małgorzata (born 1970) and Joanna (born 1971).

Jamroż died on 25 January 2023 in Gdańsk. He was buried on 1 February 2023 at the Srebrzysko Cemetery in Gdańsk.
