= University of Business and Administration in Gdynia =

Coordinates: 54.5078°N 18.5303°E

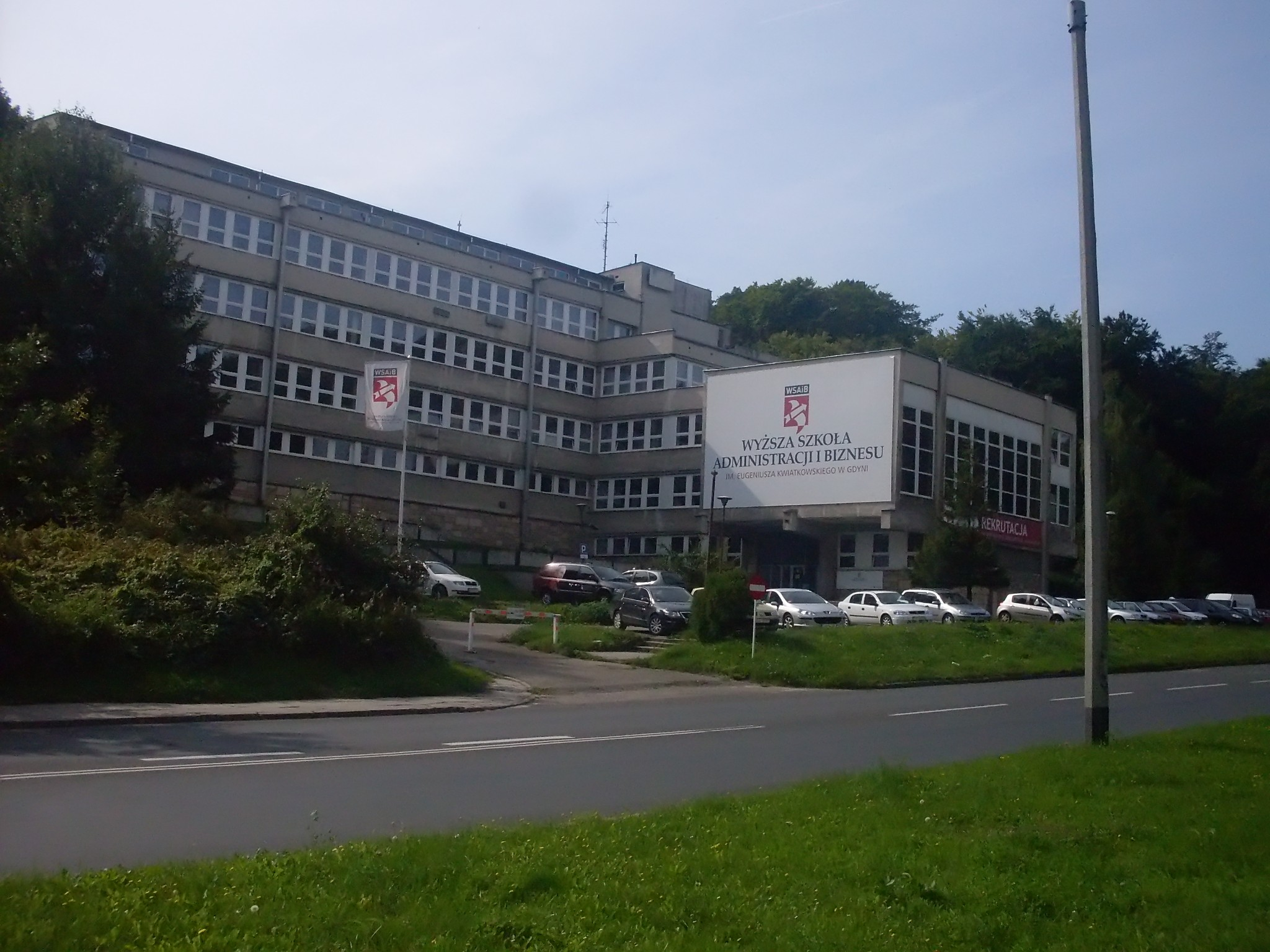
- University of Business and Administration in Gdynia
- Type: Non-public
- Established: 15 June 1994
- Principal: prof. dr hab. Jerzy Młynarczyk
- Students: 3,614 (12.2023)
- Location: Gdynia, Pomeranian Voivodeship, Poland
- Affiliations: Erasmus Programme

University of Business and Administration in Gdynia (Polish: Wyższa Szkoła Administracji i Biznesu im. Eugeniusza Kwiatkowskiego w Gdyni) is a non-public business school in Gdynia, Poland.
