= Paweł Adamowicz =

Polish politician and lawyer (1965–2019)

- Adamowicz in 2018

Mayor of Gdańsk
- In office 26 October 1998 – 14 January 2019
- Preceded by: Tomasz Posadzki
- Succeeded by: Aleksandra Dulkiewicz

Personal details
- Born: Paweł Bogdan Adamowicz; 2 November 1965 Gdańsk, Poland
- Died: 14 January 2019 (aged 53) Gdańsk, Poland
- Cause of death: Assassination by stabbing
- Party: Independent (2015–2019)
- Other political affiliations: Liberal Democratic Congress (1990–1994); Conservative Party (1994–1997); Conservative People's Party (1997–2001); Civic Platform (2001–2015)
- Spouse: Magdalena Abramska (m. 1999)
- Children: 2

Paweł Bogdan Adamowicz ([ˈpavɛw ˈbɔɡdan adaˈmɔvʲit͡ʂ]; 2 November 1965 – 14 January 2019) was a Polish politician and lawyer who served as the city mayor of Gdańsk from 1998 until his assassination in 2019.

Adamowicz was one of the organizers of the 1988 Polish strikes before becoming the head of the strike committee. In 1990, he was elected to the Gdańsk City Council, chairing the body from 1994 during his second term and holding this post until 1998. He was elected Mayor of Gdańsk in 1998 and reelected in 2002 with 72% of the vote. In 2018, he was reelected as an independent. He was known as a liberal, progressive figure, speaking in support of LGBT rights, immigration, and of minority ethnic groups such as Kashubians.

On 13 January 2019, Adamowicz was stabbed during a live charity event in Gdansk, the Great Orchestra of Christmas Charity's 27th Grand Finale, by 27-year-old Stefan Wilmont, a former inmate diagnosed with schizophrenia. He died the following day from his injuries, at the age of 53.

== Early life and education ==
Paweł Bogdan Adamowicz was born in Gdańsk. His parents, Ryszard and Teresa, were Polish economists who were moved to Poland from Vilnius, LSSR, in 1946. Paweł later recalled that his parents were suspicious of communism and party propaganda.

"Like many Poles of our generation, [my] brother and I have thus been shaped against the obligatory official history; since childhood we have known not only the sinister wording of the Gestapo abbreviation, but also the NKVD; we perfectly understood what is behind the names of distant places: Kazakhstan, Siberia, Katyn. We hardly saw a place for ourselves in this double world."

He studied law at the University of Gdańsk, where he also rose to prominence as a student movement member. He was one of the organizers of the 1988 strike, becoming the head of the strike committee. Between 1990 and 1993, he served as a vice-rector for student affairs at his alma mater.

== Career ==
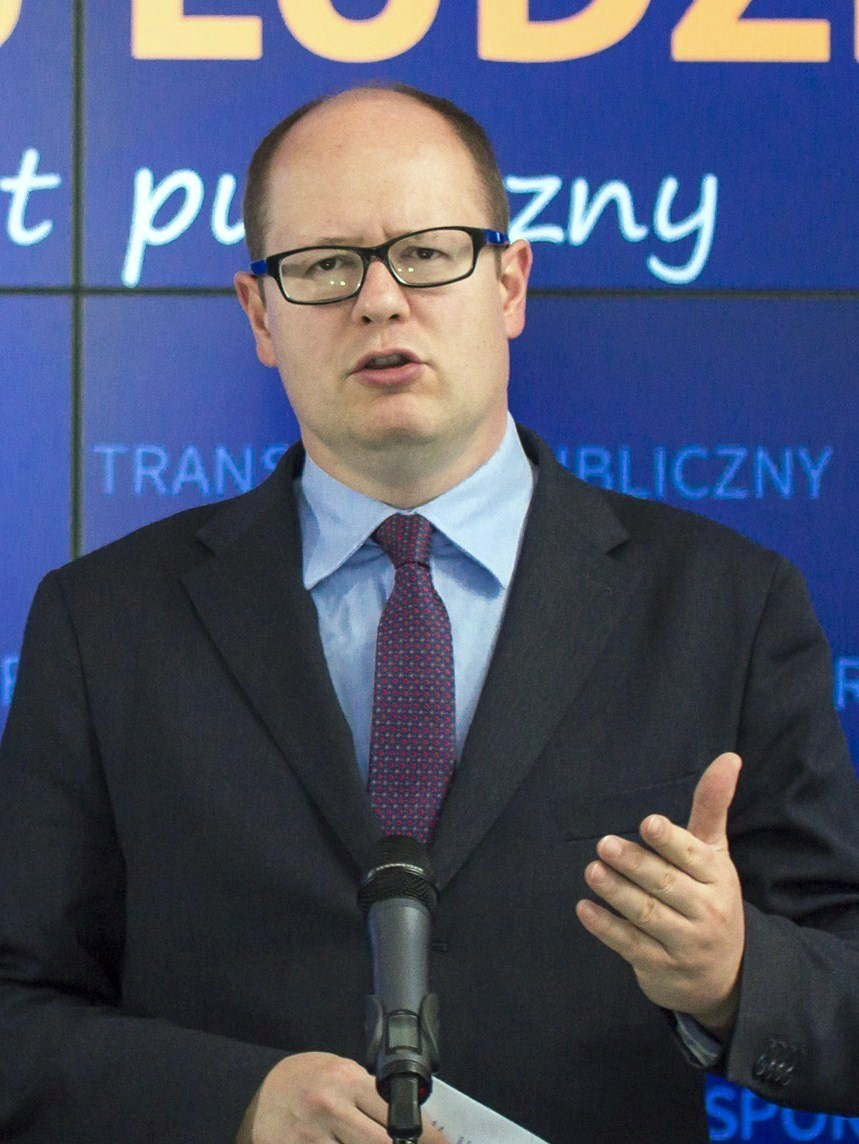
Adamowicz in 2014

In 1990, Adamowicz was elected a member of the city council in Gdańsk, chairing the council from 1994 in his second term, and holding this post until 1998, when he was elected the Mayor of Gdańsk. On 10 November 2002, he was re-elected with 72% of the vote.

He was awarded the Pro Ecclesia et Pontifice Golden Cross by Pope John Paul II, and the Cross of Merit in 2003 by President Aleksander Kwaśniewski. In 2014, he received the Cross of Freedom and Solidarity in honour of his contributions on behalf of Polish democracy.

In 2018, he was an honorary patron of the 4th Gdańsk Gay Pride Parade, in which he also participated.

In November 2018, Adamowicz ran as an independent candidate for the office of Mayor of Gdańsk and was re-elected for a sixth term, being endorsed by the Civic Platform in the second round and remaining a vocal critic of the current ruling party in Poland, Law and Justice. He was due to serve until 2023.

== Personal life ==
In 1999, Adamowicz married Magdalena Abramska, a law student at the University of Gdańsk whom he met during his studies. She later became a professor of law there. They have two daughters, Antonina (born 2003) and Teresa (born 2010).

== Assassination ==
Assassination of Paweł Adamowicz
- Location: Gdańsk, Pomorskie Voivodeship, Poland
- Date: 13 January 2019 c. 20:00 (UTC+1)
- Attack type: Assassination by stabbing
- Weapon: Knife
- Deaths: 1 (Paweł Adamowicz)
- Motive: Unclear, possibly mental illness or personal revenge
- Accused: Stefan Wilmont

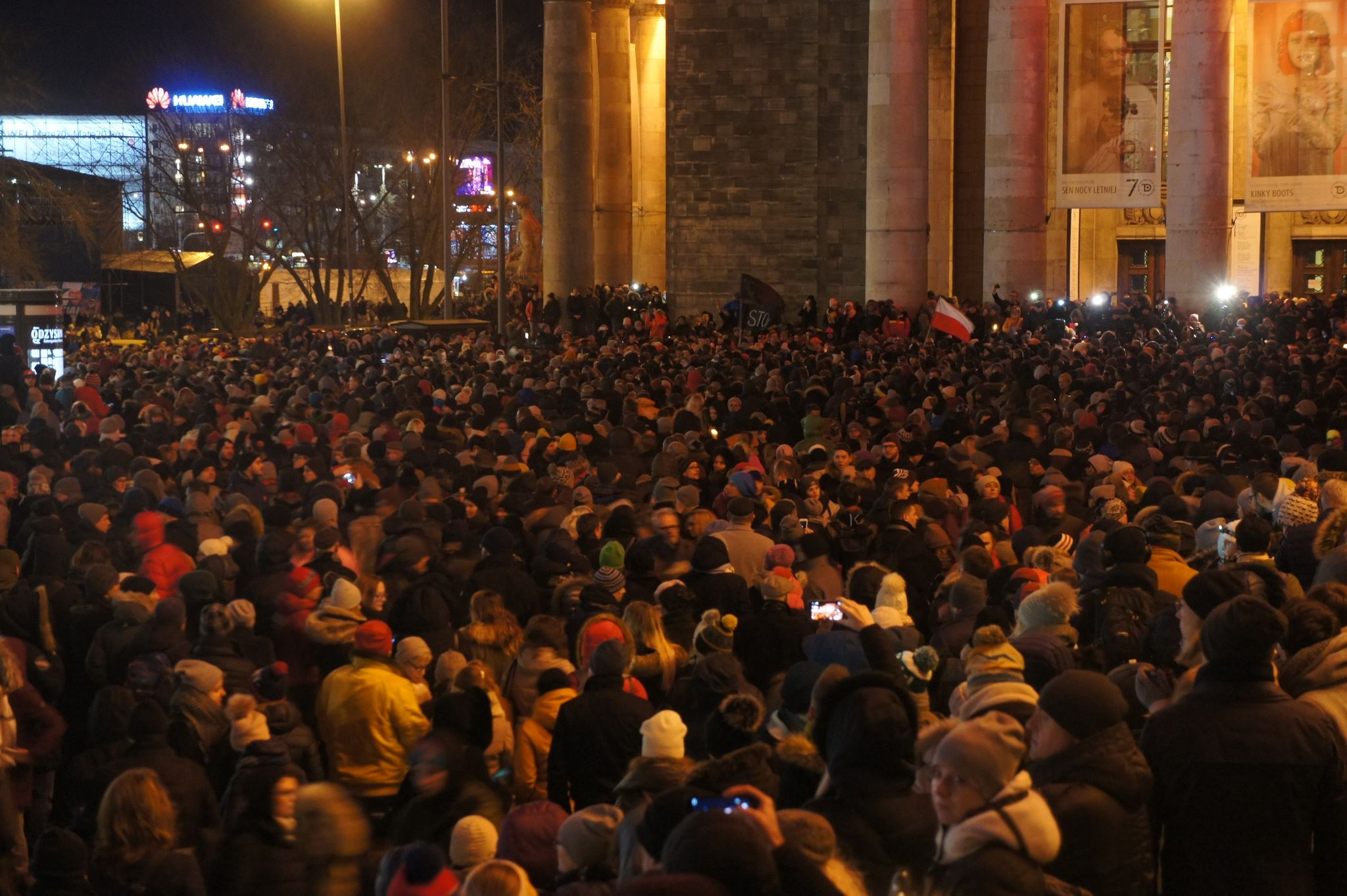
Demonstration against violence in Warsaw following the assassination of Adamowicz

On 13 January 2019, Adamowicz was stabbed in the heart and through the diaphragm with a knife on stage at the Great Orchestra of Christmas Charity event in Gdańsk and was taken to University Clinical Centre in Gdańsk in critical condition, where he underwent five hours of surgery. He succumbed to his injuries the following day.

The assassin was apprehended at the scene of the crime. A Gdańsk police spokesman said that the detained man was a 27-year-old Stefan Wilmont who lived in the city; the spokesman also stated that the man had a "long criminal history", including four bank robberies. After stabbing the mayor, he seized the microphone and claimed false imprisonment and torture at the hands of the previous centrist Civic Platform (PO) government. Adamowicz's murder was inadvertently captured on video by the many attendees of the charity event.

=== Reactions ===
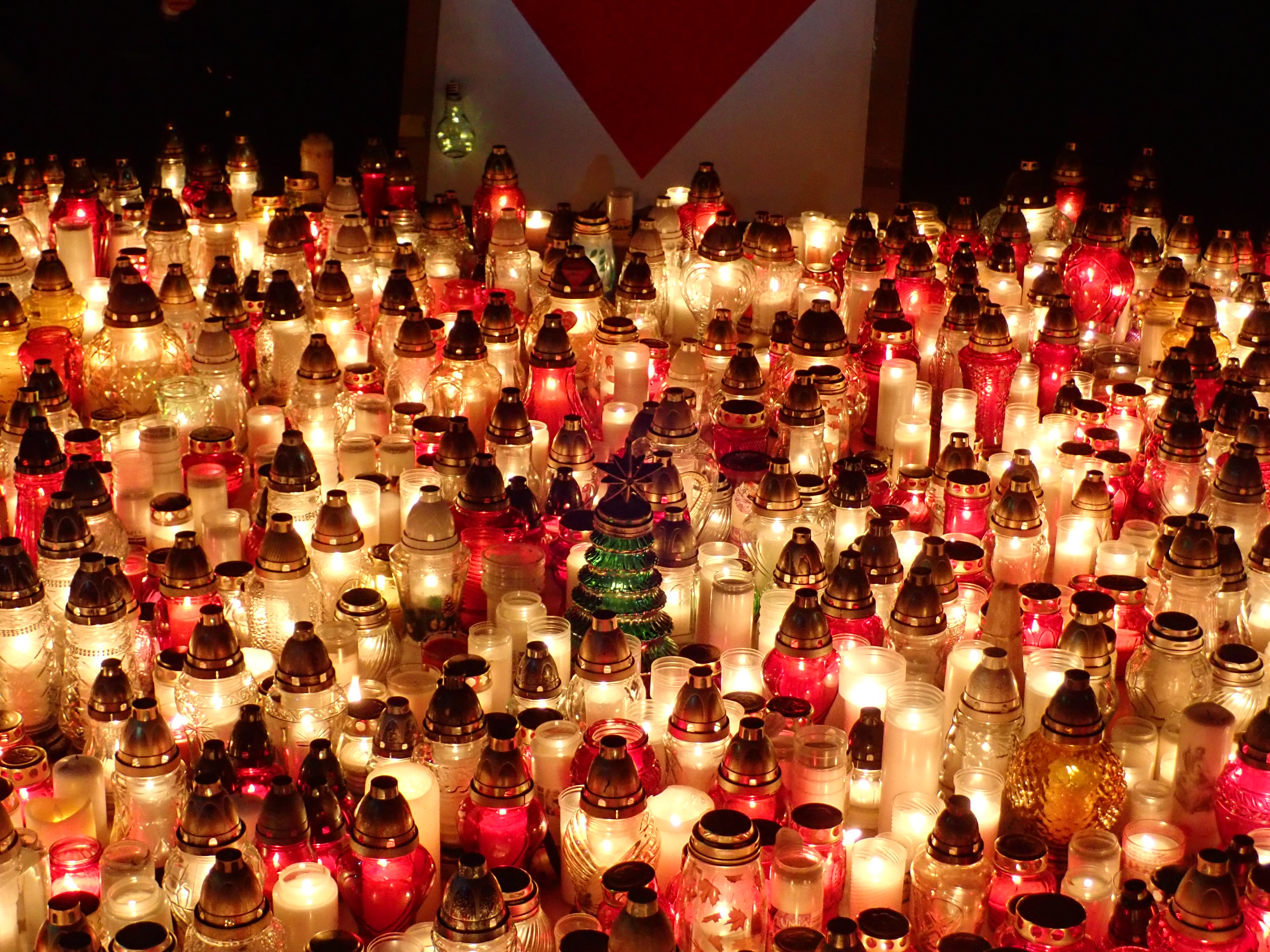
Candles arranged in the shape of a heart on the Solidarity Square in Szczecin, 16 January 2019.

On 14 January, thousands attended vigils across Poland to pay their respects to Adamowicz. His widow, Magdalena, who was in London at the time of the assassination, was flown back to Poland by the Polish government.

President Andrzej Duda described the attack as a "hard-to-imagine evil" and stated that the day of Adamowicz's funeral will be observed as a national day of mourning. Interior Minister Joachim Brudziński described the attack as "an act of inexplicable barbarism" and, on Twitter, EU Council President Donald Tusk said, "Paweł Adamowicz, Mayor of Gdańsk, a man of Solidarity and freedom, a European, my good friend, has been murdered. May he rest in peace."

Jean-Claude Juncker, the President of the European Commission, expressed "great sadness" and offered his "deepest condolences" on behalf of the European Commission. The European Parliament held a minute of silence to honour Adamowicz, with President Antonio Tajani speaking of the mayor's "closeness to the people" and "ability to listen". Sadiq Khan, the Mayor of London, described the attack as "Devastating violence ... for all of us who value public service and open, accessible democracy". Anton Alikhanov, the governor of the neighbouring Kaliningrad Oblast in Russia, expressed his condolences, calling Adamowicz "our great friend" and proclaiming a minute of silence in memory of his death. On the day of his funeral, Pope Francis offered his condolences as well as gifts for the family of Adamowicz. The mayor of Bremen Carsten Sieling, which Gdańsk is a twin city with, said "we are shocked by the terrifying and cruel death of Paweł Adamowicz". In the city hall a book of condolence was displayed from 14 January through to the 17th.

On 17 January 2019, Zdeněk Hřib, the Mayor of Prague, appealed to the city council to name a street in Prague in honor of Paweł Adamowicz. On 5 June 2019, a promenade in the Riegrovy Sady park in Prague named after Adamowicz was officially inaugurated. On 10 October 2019, the city of Athens Award for Democracy, "Honoring those building bridges when others build walls" was presented to the family of the victim by the mayor of Athens K. Bakogiannis.

== Funeral ==
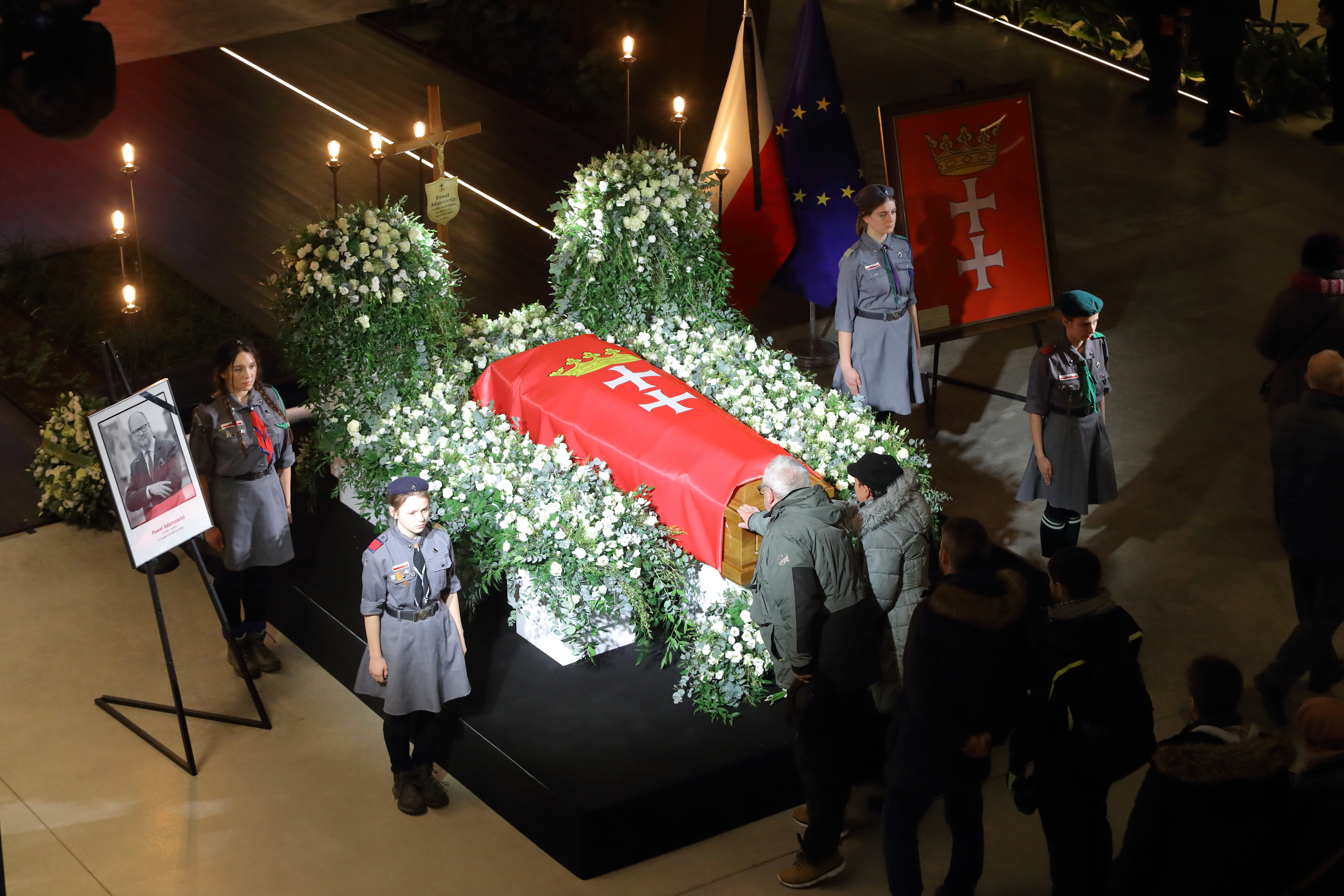
Polish Scouts guarding the coffin of Paweł Adamowicz at the European Solidarity Centre prior to the funeral

On 18 January 2019, Adamowicz's coffin was decorated with white flowers and draped with the flag of Gdańsk, before being driven in a hearse from the European Solidarity Centre in the city, past schools, monuments and other places significant to the dead mayor's life. It was watched by thousands of people on screen. When the hearse reached the Church of St Mary, the city's main basilica, the coffin was brought into the church. After a mass, Adamowicz was cremated.

On 19 January, the main funeral service was held at St Mary's Church, Gdańsk. Notable people who attended included the President of the European Council Donald Tusk, President of Poland Andrzej Duda, Prime Minister of Poland Mateusz Morawiecki, former President of Poland, communist oppositionist and Nobel Peace Prize winner Lech Wałęsa, former Polish Presidents Aleksander Kwaśniewski and Bronisław Komorowski, and former German President Joachim Gauck. Thousands more Poles watched the service on screens. At the end of the service, Adamowicz's ashes were laid to rest in one of the chapels of St Mary's Church in Gdańsk.

== Selected awards ==
- Pro Ecclesia et Pontifice Golden Cross (Vatican, 2001)
- Cross of Merit (Poland) (2003)
- Knight's Cross of the Order of Polonia Restituta (Poland, 2010)
- Knight of the Legion of Honour (France, 2012)
- Order of the Cross of Terra Mariana (Estonia, 2014)
- Cross of Freedom and Solidarity (Poland, 2014)
- Honorary Citizen of the Capital City of Warsaw (Poland, 2019)
- Benjamin Barber Global Cities Award conferred by the Global Parliament of Mayors and accepted by Deputy Mayor Piotr Grzelak (South Africa, 2019)
