= Gottlieb Hufeland =

German economist and jurist (1760–1817)

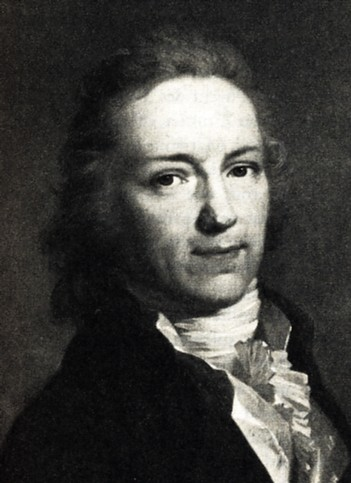
Gottlieb Hufeland

Gottlieb Hufeland (29 October 1760 – 25 February 1817) was a German economist and jurist.

== Biography ==
Born in Danzig (Gdańsk), Royal Prussia, Crown of Poland, Hufeland was educated at the gymnasium of his native town, and completed his university studies at Leipzig and Göttingen. He graduated at Jena, and in 1788 was there appointed to an extraordinary professorship. Five years later he was made ordinary professor.

His lectures on natural law, in which he developed with great acuteness and skill the formal principles of the Kantian theory of legislation, attracted a large audience, and contributed to raise to its height the fame of the University of Jena, then unusually rich in able teachers. In 1803, after the departure of many of his colleagues from Jena, Hufeland accepted a call to Würzburg, from which, after but a brief tenure of a professorial chair, he proceeded to Landshut. From 1806 to 1812 he acted as burgomaster in his native town of Danzig. Returning to Landshut, he lived there until 1816, when he was invited to the University of Halle.

In political economy Hufeland's chief work is the Neue Grundlegung der Staatswirthschaftskunst (2 vols, 1807 and 1813), the second volume of which has the special title, Lehre vom Gelde und Geldumlaufe. The principles of this work are for the most part those of Adam Smith's Wealth of Nations, which were then beginning to be accepted and developed in Germany; but both in his treatment of fundamental notions, such as economic good and value, and in details, such as the theory of money, Hufeland's treatment has a certain originality.

Two points in particular seem deserving of notice. Hufeland was the first among German economists to point out the profit of the entrepreneur as a distinct species of revenue with laws peculiar to itself. He also tends towards, though he does not explicitly state the view that rent is a general term applicable to all payments resulting from differences of degree among productive forces of the same order. Thus the superior gain of a specially gifted workman or specially skilled employer is in time assimilated to the payment for a natural agency of more than the minimum efficiency.

Hufeland died in 1817 in Halle an der Saale.

== Works ==
Hufeland's works on the theory of legislation:

- Versuch über den Grundsatz Naturrechts (1785)
- Lehrbuch des Naturrechts (1790)
- Institutionen des gesammten positiven Rechts (1798)
- Lehrbuch der Geschichte und Encyclopadie alter in Deutschland geltenden positiven Rechte (1790)

They are distinguished by precision of statement and clearness of deduction.
