= Free City of Danzig =

Semi-autonomous European city-state (1920–1939)

Coordinates: 54.40°N 18.66°E

Free City of Danzig Freie Stadt Danzig (German) Wolne Miasto Gdańsk (Polish)
- 1920–1939
- Flag Coat of arms
- Motto: "Nec Temere, Nec Timide" "Neither rashly nor timidly"
- Anthem: Für Danzig
- Location of the Free City of Danzig in Europe (1930)
- Status: Free City under League of Nations protection
- Capital: Danzig
- Common languages: Official: German Minorities: Polish; Yiddish; Kashubian
- Religion: 57% Lutheran; 38% Catholic; 3% Jewish; 2% Other (1926)
- Demonyms: Danziger, Gdańszczanie
- Government: Republic
- LoN High Commissioner
  - 1919–1920 (first): Reginald Tower
  - 1937–1939 (last): C. J. Burckhardt
- Presidents of the Senate and Head of the State
  - 1920–1931 (first): Heinrich Sahm
  - 1939 (last): Albert Förster
- Legislature: Volkstag
- Historical era: Interwar period
  - Established: 15 November 1920
  - Annexed by Germany: 1 September 1939
  - Awarded to Poland: 1 August 1945

Area
- 1928: 1,952 km^{2} (754 sq mi)

Population
  - 1923: 366,730
- Currency: Papiermark (1920–1923); Gulden (1923–1939)
Preceded by	Succeeded by
Province of West Prussia	Reichsgau; Danzig-West Prussia
- Today part of: Poland

The Free City of Danzig ([dˈanzɪɡ], German: Freie Stadt Danzig; Polish: Wolne Miasto Gdańsk) was a city-state under the protection and oversight of the League of Nations between 1920 and 1939, consisting of the Baltic Sea port of Danzig (now Gdańsk, Poland) and nearly 200 other small localities in the surrounding areas. The country was established on 15 November 1920, per the terms of Article 100 (Section XI of Part III) of the 1919 Treaty of Versailles, following the end of World War I.

Although predominantly German-populated, the territory was bound by the imposed union with Poland, which covered foreign policy, defense, customs, railways, and post, and remained distinct from both the post-war Weimar Republic and the newly independent Polish Republic. Additionally, Poland was granted certain rights related to port facilities in the city.

In the 1920 Constituent Assembly election, the Polish Party received over 6% of the vote; however, its percentage of votes later declined to approximately 3%. A large number of Danzig Poles voted for the Catholic Centre Party instead. In 1921, Poland began developing the city of Gdynia, a mid-sized fishing town. This new port, located north of Danzig, was established on territory awarded in 1919, known as the Polish Corridor. By 1933, the commerce passing through Gdynia exceeded that of Danzig. By 1936, the city's Senate had a majority of local Nazis, and agitation to rejoin Germany was stepped up.

After the German invasion of Poland in 1939, the Nazis abolished the Free City and incorporated the area into the newly formed Reichsgau of Danzig-West Prussia. The Nazis classified the Poles and Jews living in the city as subhumans, subjecting them to discrimination, forced labor, and extermination at Nazi concentration camps, including nearby Stutthof (now Sztutowo, Poland). Upon the city's capture in the early months of 1945 by the Soviet and Polish troops, a significant number of German inhabitants perished in ill-prepared and over-delayed attempts to evacuate by sea, while the remainder fled or were expelled. The city was fully integrated into Poland due to the Potsdam Agreement, while members of the pre-war Polish ethnic minority began returning, and new Polish settlers started arriving. Gdańsk suffered severe underpopulation due to these events and did not recover until the late 1950s.

== Establishment ==
=== Territory ===
Physical map of the territory around the later Free City of Danzig in the year 1910

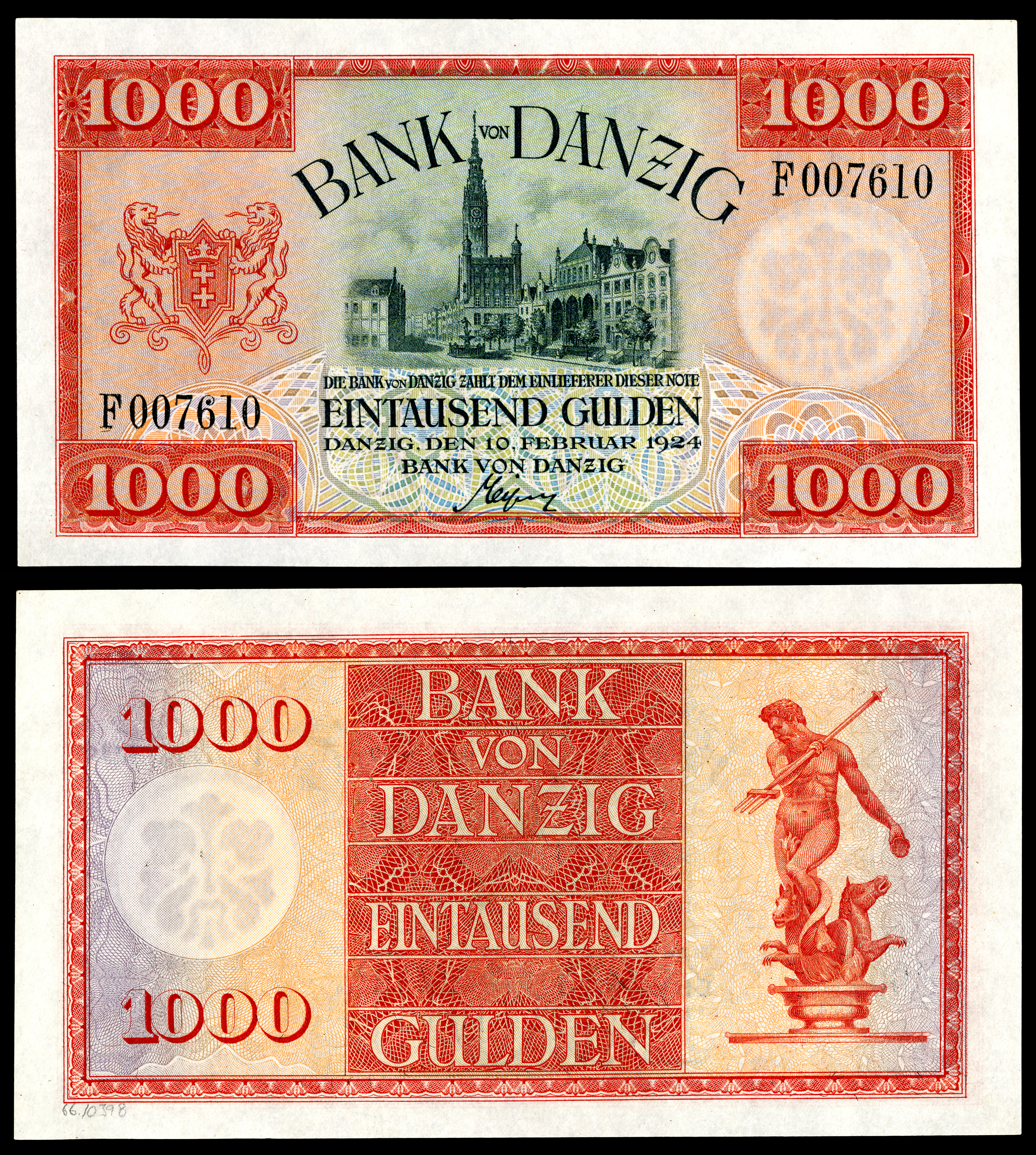
1,000 Danzig gulden (1924) depicting City Hall

The Free City of Danzig included the city of Danzig (Gdańsk), the towns of Zoppot (Sopot), Oliva (Oliwa), Tiegenhof (Nowy Dwór Gdański), Neuteich (Nowy Staw), and some 252 villages and 63 hamlets, covering a total area of 1,966 square kilometres (759 sq mi). The cities of Danzig (since 1818) and Zoppot (since 1920) formed autonomous cities (Stadtkreise), whereas all other towns and municipalities were part of one of the three rural districts (Landkreise), Danziger Höhe, Danziger Niederung (both seated in Danzig city), and Großes Werder, seated in Tiegenhof.

In the east, the Free City encompassed much of the Vistula Fens, a broad and flat region at the mouth of the Vistula River which had been heavily cultivated for centuries. The Nogat River marked the border between the Free City and Germany. The Tiege River rose near the tripoint between the Free City of Danzig, East Prussia, and Poland, and flowed through the towns of Neuteich and Tiegenhof. The territory of the Free City extended to the western end of the Vistula Spit.

In the west, the landscape was much more hilly, being located on the eastern end of the Kashubian Lake District. The Mottlau River picked up numerous tributaries, including the Kladau and the Radaune, on its way northward to the city of Danzig itself and from thence to the Dead Vistula and the Baltic Sea.

In 1928, its territory covered 1,952 km2, including 58 square kilometers of freshwater surface. The border had a length of 290.5 km (180.5 mi), of which the coastline accounted for 66.35 km (41.23 mi) (although coastline measures are not well-defined).

=== Periods of independence and autonomy ===
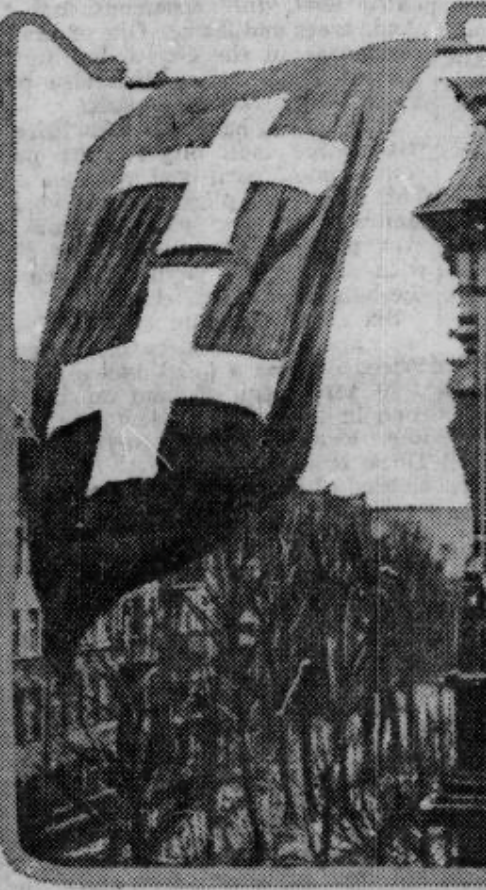
City flag from 1920

Danzig had an early history of independence. It was a leading player in the Prussian Confederation, which was directed against the Monastic State of the Teutonic Knights. The Confederation stipulated with the Polish king, Casimir IV Jagiellon, that the Polish Crown would be invested as head of state of the western parts of Prussia (Royal Prussia). In contrast, Ducal Prussia remained a Polish fief. Danzig and other cities, such as Elbing and Thorn, financed most of the warfare and enjoyed high city autonomy.

In 1569, when Royal Prussia's estates agreed to incorporate the region into the Polish–Lithuanian Commonwealth, the city insisted on preserving its special status. It defended itself through the Siege of Danzig in 1577 to protect its special privileges. Subsequently, it insisted on negotiating by sending emissaries directly to the Polish king. Danzig's location as a deep-water port where the Vistula River met the Baltic Sea had made it into one of the wealthiest cities in Europe in the 16th and 17th centuries, as grain from Poland and Ukraine was shipped down the Vistula on barge to be loaded onto ships in Danzig, where it was shipped on to western Europe. As many merchants shipping the grain from Danzig were Dutch and built Dutch-style houses for themselves, leading to other Danzigers imitating them, the city was thus given a distinctively Dutch appearance. Danzig became known as "the Amsterdam of the East", a wealthy seaport and trading crossroads that linked Western and Eastern European economies. Its location, where the Vistula flowed into the Baltic, led to various powers competing to rule the city.

Although Danzig became part of the Kingdom of Prussia following the Second Partition of Poland in 1793, Prussia was subsequently conquered by Napoleon Bonaparte in 1806. In September 1807, Napoleon declared Danzig a semi-independent client state of the French Empire, known as the Free City of Danzig. It lasted seven years, until it was reincorporated into the Kingdom of Prussia in 1814, following Napoleon's defeat at the Battle of Leipzig (also known as the Battle of Nations) at the hands of a coalition that included Russia, Austria, and Prussia.

Point 13 of U.S. President Woodrow Wilson's Fourteen Points called for Polish independence to be restored and for Poland to have "secure access to the sea", a promise that implied that Danzig, which occupied a strategic location where the Vistula River flowed into the Baltic Sea, should become part of Poland. At the Paris Peace Conference in 1919, the Polish delegation, led by Roman Dmowski, asked for Wilson to honor point 13 of the Fourteen Points by transferring Danzig to Poland, arguing that Poland would not be economically viable without Danzig and that since the city had been part of Poland until 1793, it was rightfully part of Poland anyway. However, Wilson had promised that national self-determination would be the basis of the Treaty of Versailles. As 90% of the people in Danzig in this period were German, the Allied leaders at the Paris Peace Conference compromised by creating the Free City of Danzig, a city-state in which Poland had certain special rights. It was felt that including a city that was 90% German into Poland would be a violation of the principle of national self-determination, but at the same time, the promise in the Fourteen Points of allowing Poland "secure access to the sea" gave Poland a claim on Danzig, hence the compromise of the Free City of Danzig.

The Free City of Danzig was primarily the result of British diplomacy, as both French Premier Georges Clemenceau and U.S. President Woodrow Wilson supported the Polish claim to Danzig (Gdańsk). Only objections from the British Prime Minister, David Lloyd George, prevented Danzig from being awarded to Poland. Despite creating the Free City, the British did not believe in the viability of the Free City of Danzig; Lloyd George wrote at the time: "France would tomorrow fight for Alsace if her right to it were contested. But would we make war for Danzig?" The Foreign Secretary Arthur Balfour wrote in the summer of 1918 that the Germans had such a ferocious contempt for Poles that it was unwise for Germany to lose any territory to Poland, even if morally justified, as the Germans would never accept losing land to the despised Poles, and such a situation was bound to cause a war. During the Paris Peace Conference in 1919, the British consistently sought to minimize German territorial losses to Poland because the Germans had such an utter contempt for the Poles, together with the rest of the Slavic peoples, that such losses were bound to wound their feelings deeply and cause a war. For all the bitterness of the French–German enmity, the Germans had a certain grudging respect for the French that did not extend to the Poles. During the Paris Peace Conference, a commission of inquiry chaired by British historian James Headlam-Morley, which was investigating where the borders between Germany and Poland, began researching the history of Danzig. Upon discovering that Danzig had been a Free City in the past, Headlam-Morley devised what he regarded as a brilliant compromise solution, under which Danzig would become a Free City again, belonging to neither Germany nor Poland. As the British opposed Danzig becoming part of Poland, and the French and Americans opposed Danzig remaining part of Germany, Headlam-Morley's compromise of the Free City of Danzig was accepted.

The representatives of the German population of Danzig complained about being severed from Germany, and constantly demanded that the Free City of Danzig be reincorporated into the Reich. The Canadian historian Margaret MacMillan wrote that a sense of Danzig national identity emerged during the Free City's existence, and the German population of Danzig did not always regard themselves as Germans who had been unjustly taken out of Germany. The loss of Danzig deeply hurt German national pride, and, in the interwar period, German nationalists spoke of the "open wound in the east" that was the Free City of Danzig. However, until the building of Gdynia, almost all of Poland's exports went through Danzig, and Polish public opinion was opposed to Germany having a "choke-hold" on the Polish economy.

=== Polish rights declared by the Treaty of Versailles ===
The Free City was to be represented abroad by Poland and be in a customs union. The German railway line that connected the Free City with newly created Poland was to be administered by Poland, as were all rail lines in the territory of the Free City. On 9 November 1920, a convention was signed between the Polish government and the Danzig authorities, providing for a Polish diplomatic representative in Danzig. In Article 6, the Polish government undertook not to conclude any international agreements regarding Danzig without first consulting the government of the Free City.

A separate Polish post office was established in addition to the existing municipal one.

=== League of Nations High Commissioners ===
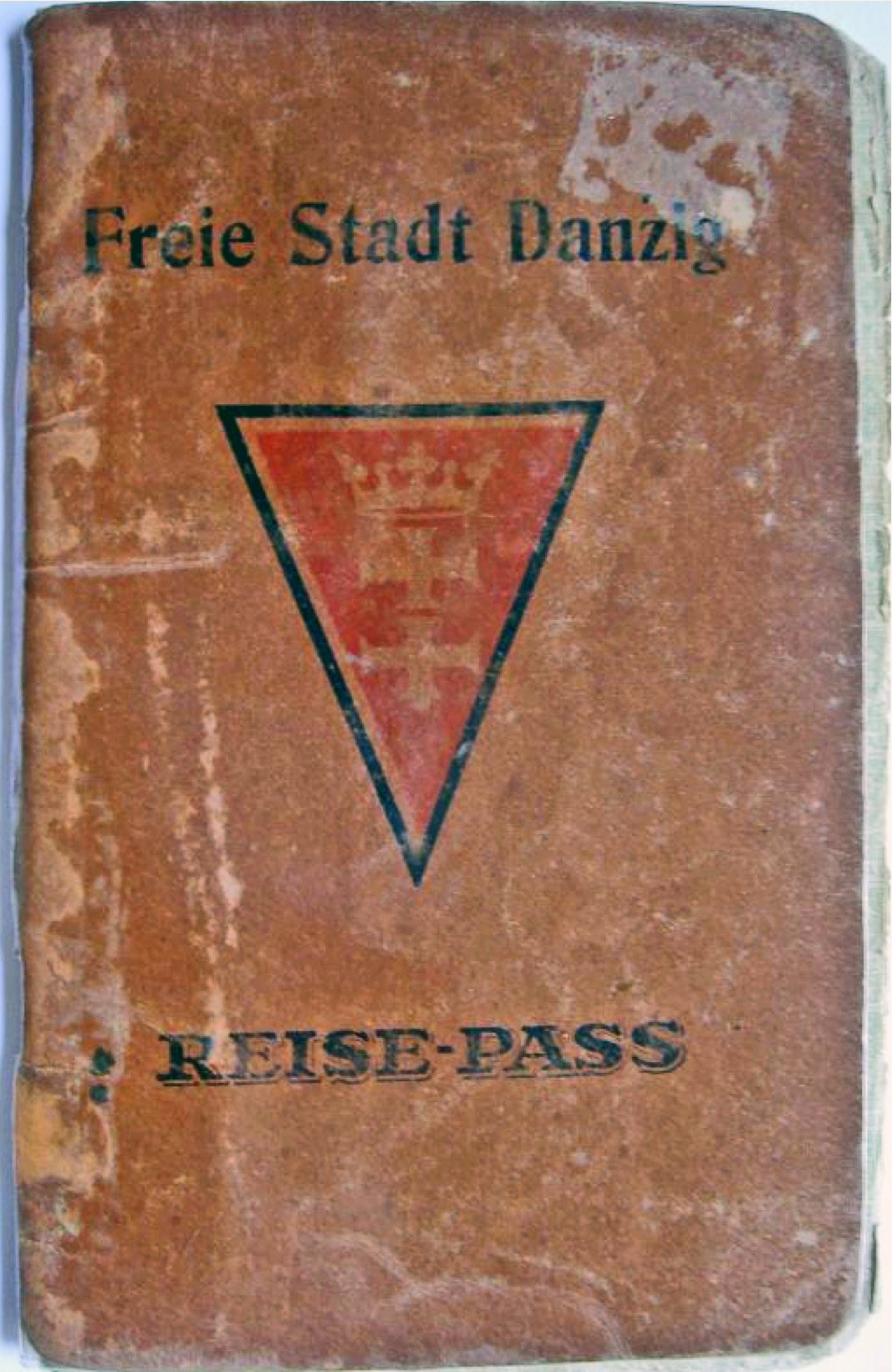
Passport of the Free City of Danzig

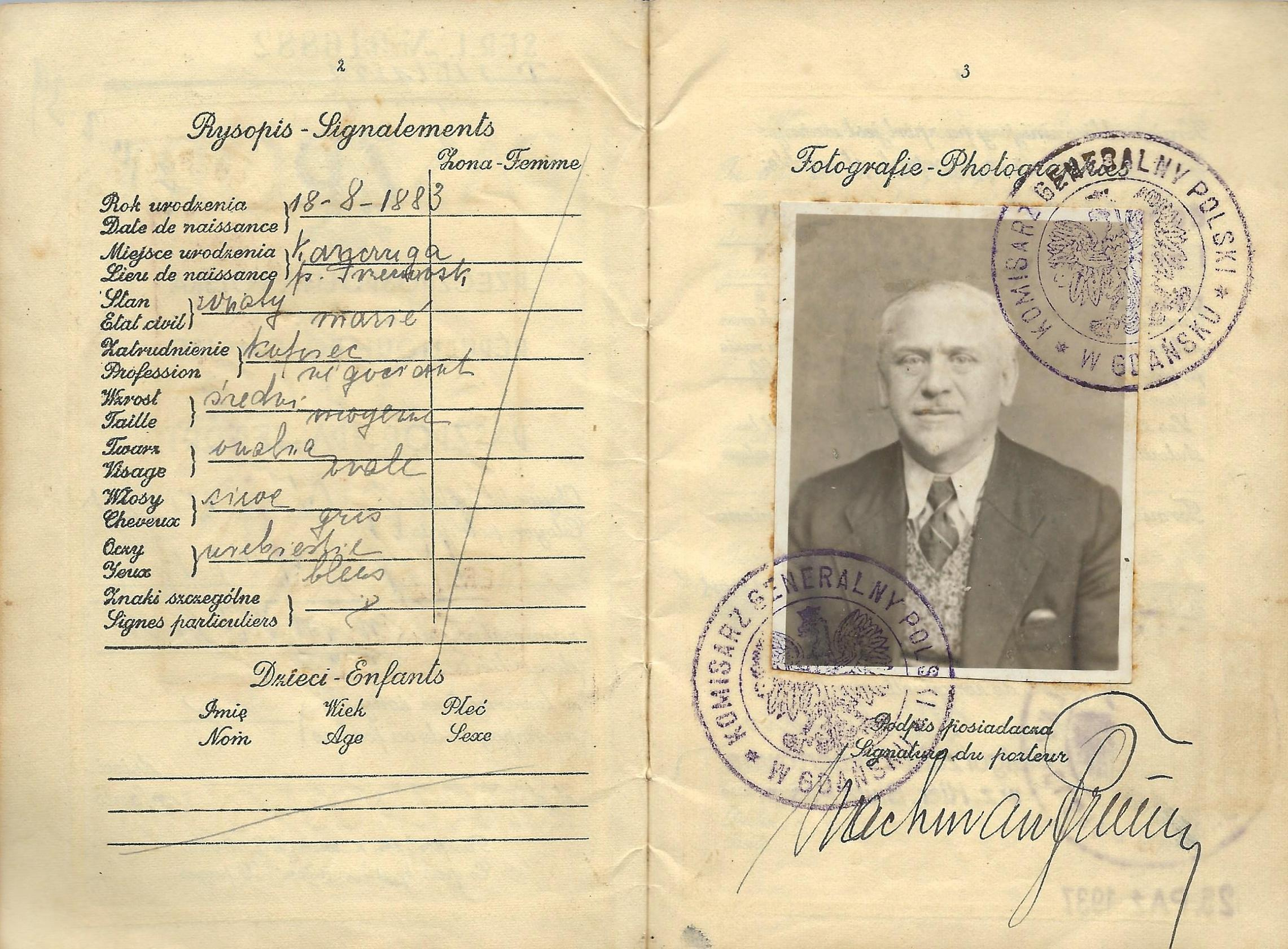
Polish passport issued at Danzig by the "Polish Commission for Gdańsk" in 1935 and extended again in 1937, before the holder immigrated to British Palestine the following year

Unlike Mandatory territories, which were entrusted to member countries, the Free City of Danzig (like the Territory of the Saar Basin) remained directly under the authority of the League of Nations. Representatives from various countries assumed the role of High Commissioner:

No.	Name	Period	Country
1	Reginald Tower	1919–1920	United Kingdom
2	Edward Lisle Strutt	1920	United Kingdom
3	Bernardo Attolico	1920	Italy
4	Richard Haking	1921–1923	United Kingdom
5	Mervyn Sorley McDonnell	1923–1925	United Kingdom
6	Joost Adriaan van Hamel	1925–1929	Netherlands
7	Manfredi di Gravina	1929–1932	Italy
8	Helmer Rosting	1932–1934	Denmark
9	Seán Lester	1934–1936	Irish Free State
10	Carl Jacob Burckhardt	1937–1939	Switzerland

The League of Nations refused to allow the city-state to use Hanseatic City as part of its official name, referring to Danzig's long-standing membership in the Hanseatic League.

=== State Constabulary ===
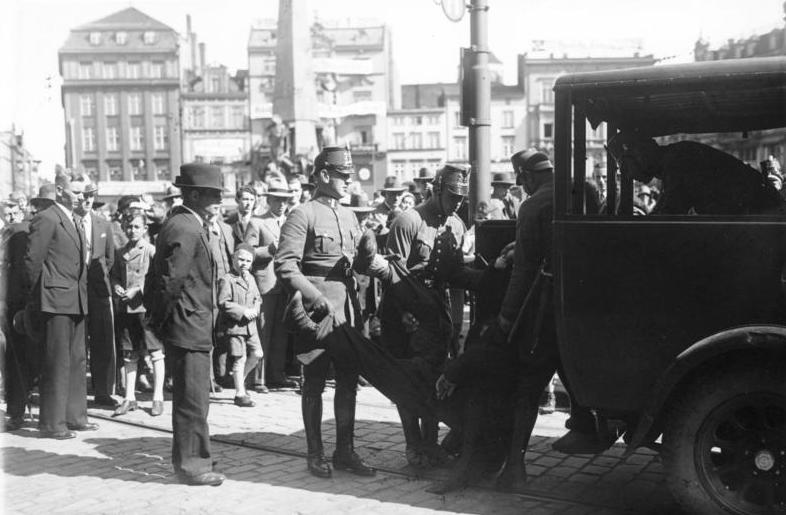
Danzig police arrest a protester in the aftermath of the 1933 Parliamentary Elections

With the creation of the Free City in the aftermath of World War I, a security police force was created on 19 August 1919. On 9 April 1920, a military style marching band, the Musikkorps, was formed. Led by composer Ernst Stieberitz, the police band gained widespread recognition in the city and abroad. In 1921, Danzig's government reformed the entire institution and established the Schutzpolizei, or protection police. Helmut Froböss became President of the Police (i.e., Chief) on 1 April 1921. He served in this capacity until the German annexation of the city.

The police initially operated from twelve precincts and seven registration points. In 1926, the number of precincts was reduced to seven.

After the Nazi takeover of the Senate, the police were increasingly used to suppress free speech and political dissent. In 1933, Froböss ordered the left-wing newspapers Danziger Volksstimme and Danziger Landeszeitung to suspend publications for two months and eight days, respectively.

By 1939, Polish-German relations had worsened, and war seemed a likely possibility. The police began planning to seize Polish installations within the city in the event of conflict. Ultimately, the Danzig police participated in the September Campaign, fighting alongside the local SS and the German Army at the city's Polish post office and at Westerplatte.

Even though Nazi Germany formally annexed the Free City in October 1939, the police force more or less continued to operate as a law enforcement agency. The Stutthof concentration camp, 35 km east of the city, was run by the President of the Police as an internment camp from 1939 until November 1941. Administration was finally dissolved when the Soviets occupied the city in 1945.

== Population ==
Linguistic map of the territory around the later Free City of Danzig in the year 1910

Around 1600, the city's population was composed of over 90% Germans and adherents of Protestantism. Around 1700, more than 80% of the inhabitants were Protestants, followed by Catholics with about 10% and a smaller but significant group of Calvinists, while German remained the dominant language. According to another source, in year 1770, shortly before the Partitions of Poland, only 58% of the inhabitants were Germans, while 42% were all others (including Poles and Kashubians). By 1816, the proportion of Catholics had risen to 23.6%, whereas Protestants accounted for 70%. In 1890, according to Stefan Ramułt there were 92.28% Germans, 0.94% Poles, 4.50% Kashubians, 2.11% Jews and 0.17% others.

The Free City's population rose from 357,000 (1919) to 408,000 in 1929; according to the official census of 1923, 95% were Germans, with 3.72% either Kashubians or Poles, however in 1920 election 6.1% of the inhabitants of the Free City voted for the Polish Party. According to E. Cieślak, the population registers of the city of Danzig show that in 1929 the Polish population numbered over 35,000, or 9.1%. The same figure of 9.1% Poles and Kashubians in the Free City in 1929 is given by T. Kijeński. Henryk Stępniak estimates the Polish population in the Free City of Danzig in 1920 at between 9% and 11%, and in 1930 at 13%.

In the 1930s, the Polish population increased. Some estimates suggest the proportion of Poles in the population of the Free City was around 20% in 1939 or around 25% in 1936.

Based on the estimated voting patterns (according to Stępniak, many Poles voted for the Catholic Zentrumspartei instead of Polish parties), Stępniak estimates the number of Poles in the city to be 25–30% of Catholics living within it, or about 30–36 thousand people. Including around 4,000 Polish nationals who were registered in the city, Stępniak estimated the Polish population as 9.4–11% of the population in 1920.

In contrast, Stefan Samerski estimates about 10 percent of the 130,000 Catholics were Polish. Andrzej Drzycimski estimates that Polish population at the end of 30s reached 20% (including Poles who arrived after the war).

The Catholic priest Franciszek Rogaczewski estimated that Poles made up about 20% of the population of the Free City of Danzig in 1936. Another significant minority was the Kashubs, another West Slavic group who derived their language from Pomeranian and had their own independent identity. Additionally, as the result of Kulturkampf laws, German Catholics, who made up about 40% of the city's population, supported the Polish national movement and stood up for Polish interests. This was further exacerbated by anti-Catholic legislation introduced by NSDAP-dominated Danzig Senate, which involved arrests of Catholic clergy as well as the activists and members of the Catholic Centre Party. The Catholic Centre Party was friendly to the Danzig Poles, and many Poles voted for the Centre Party instead of Polish organisations. The German Catholic clergy in Danzig also strongly supported the Polish minority, and the Bishop of Danzig, Edward O'Rourke, actively fought for the interests of Danzig Poles.

In 1929, Tadeusz Kijański, a Polish citizen of Danzig, questioned the results of the official 1923 census, according to which only 3% to 1% of the Danzig population was Polish. Kijański pointed out that the census was conducted by the police, which was "a deviation from the usual and only sensible and proven way of conducting this type of census". The police officers in charge of conducting the census were mostly German citizens who were granted Danzig citizenship for the duration of their service, and there were several incidents in which they intimidated the local non-German population. The census also often relied on information provided by landlords or homeowners instead of asking each citizen directly; as a result, Kijański stated that "the results of the census show significant deviations from the actual proportions in terms of nationality data". According to Kijański, many Poles in Danzig did not reveal their nationality in the census as a result of this intimidation, as well as pressure from German employers. He estimated that Poles accounted for 14.5% of the Free City's permanent population, but noted that the actual number of Poles may have been higher, as Poles made up 60% of all foreigners in Danzig at the time.

The Treaty of Versailles required that the newly formed state have its own citizenship, based on residency. German inhabitants lost their German citizenship with the creation of the Free City, but were given the right to re-obtain it within the first two years of the state's existence. Anyone desiring German citizenship had to leave their property and make their residence outside the Free State of Danzig area in the remaining parts of Germany.

Total population by language, 1 November 1923, according to the Free City of Danzig census
Nationality	German	German and Polish	Polish, Kashub, Masurian	Russian, Ukrainian	Hebrew, Yiddish	Unclassified	Total
Danzig	327,827	1,108	6,788	99	22	77	335,921
Non-Danzig	20,666	521	5,239	2,529	580	1,274	30,809
Total	348,493	1,629	12,027	2,628	602	1,351	366,730
Percent	95.03%	0.44%	3.28%	0.72%	0.16%	0.37%	100.00%

=== Notable people born in the Free City of Danzig ===
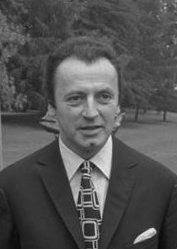
Eddi Arent in 1971

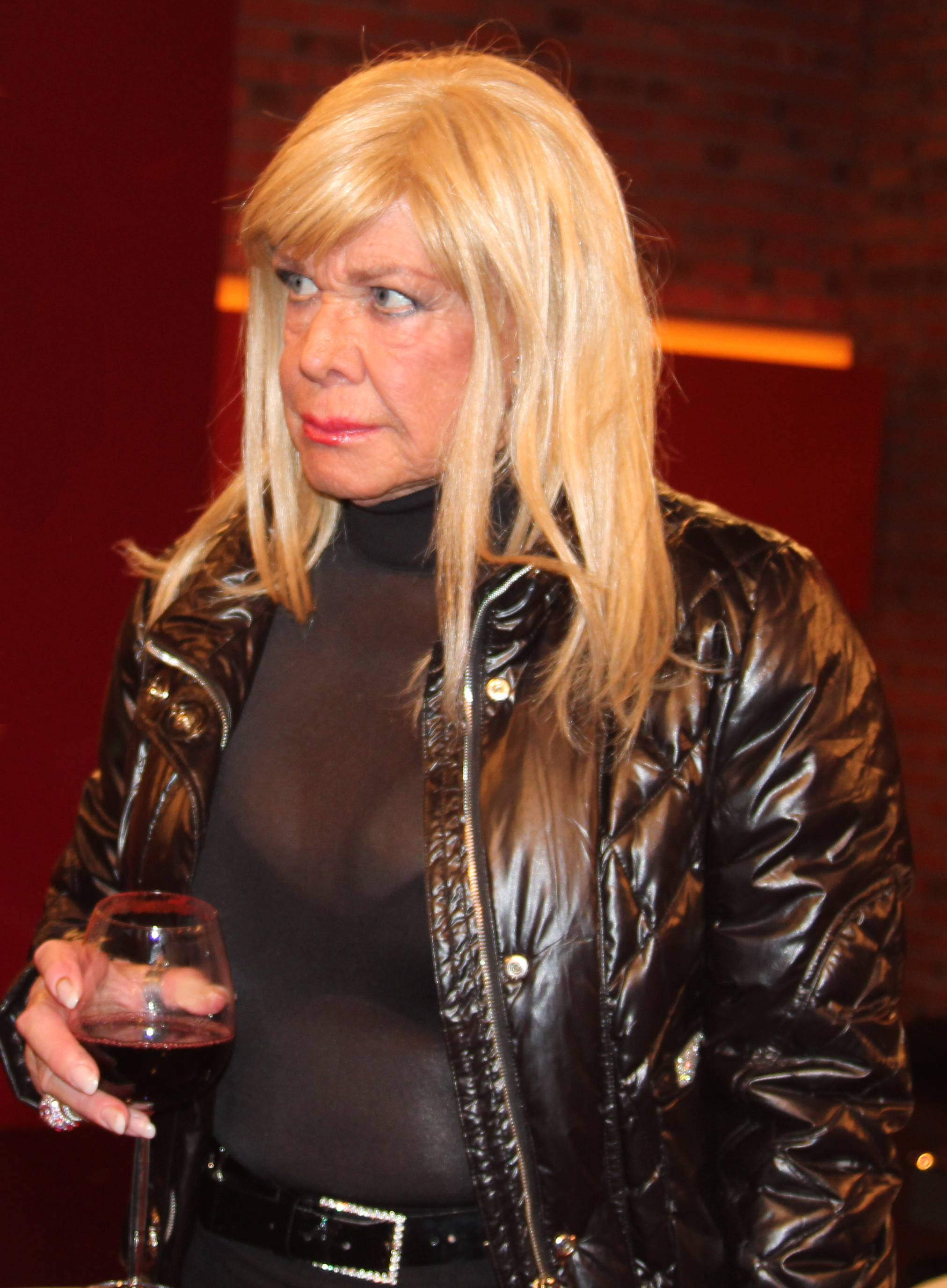
Ingrid van Bergen in 2010

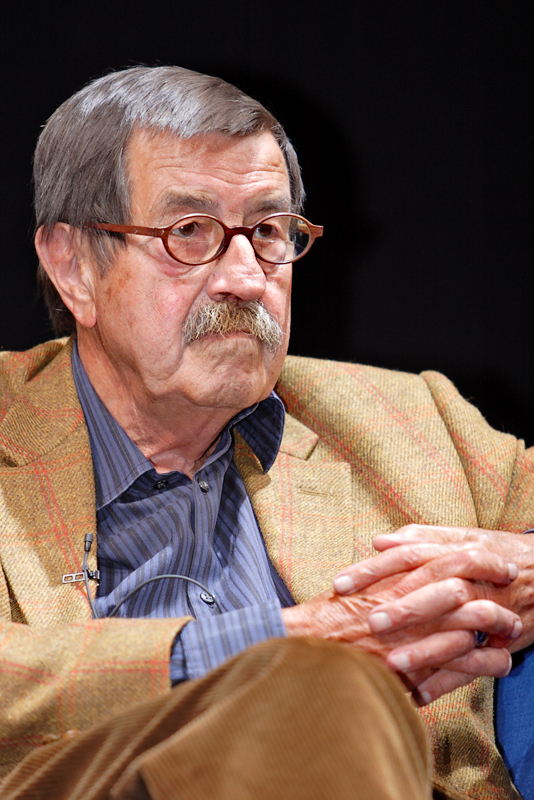
Günter Grass in 2006

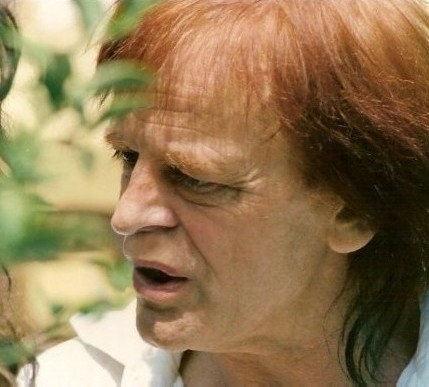
Klaus Kinski in the 1980s

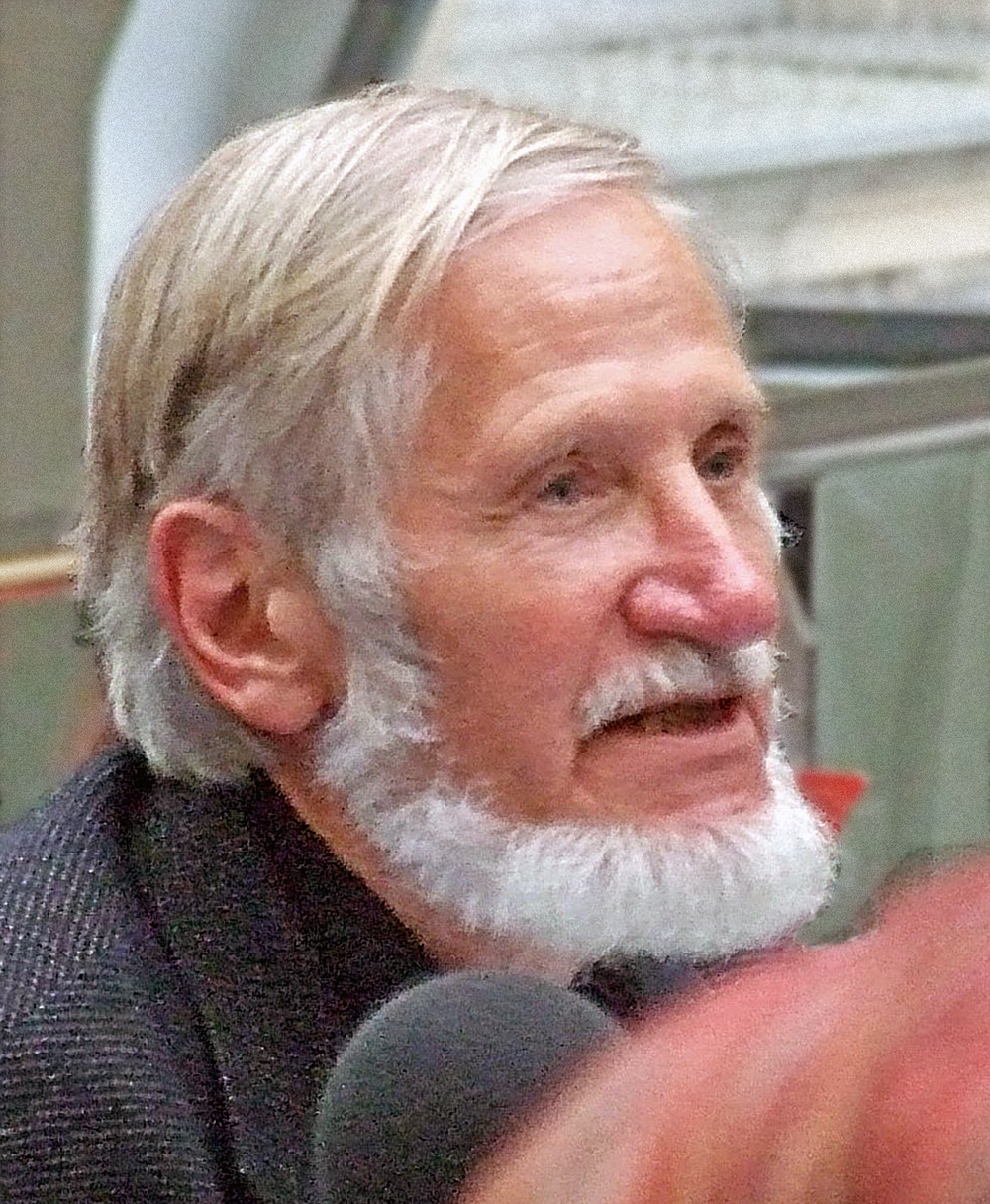
Rupert Neudeck 2007

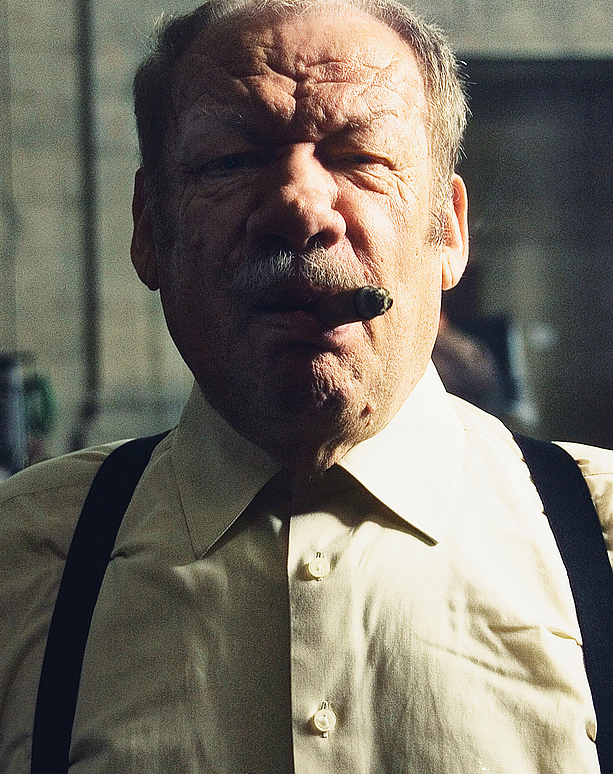
Wolfgang Völz in 2011

- Eddi Arent (1925 in Danzig – 2013 in Munich) was a German actor, cabaret artist and comedian. He appeared in 104 films between 1956 and 2002.
- Ike Aronowicz (1923 in Danzig – 2009 in Israel), captain of the immigrant ship SS Exodus, which unsuccessfully tried to dock in Mandatory Palestine with Holocaust survivors on July 11, 1947.
- Elisabeth Becker (1923 in Danzig – executed 1946 in Biskupia Górka) was a concentration camp guard in World War II.
- Ingrid van Bergen (1931 in Danzig - 2025 in Eyendorf) was a German film actress. She had appeared in 100 films since 1954. Convicted of manslaughter in 1977.
- Miltiades Caridis (1923 in Danzig – 1998 in Athens) was a German-Greek conductor; his family moved to Greece in 1938.
- Zygmunt Chychła (1926 in Gdańsk – 2009 in Hamburg) was a Polish boxer. He won the Olympic gold medal for Poland at the 1952 Summer Olympics.
- Anna M. Cienciala (1929 in Danzig – 2014 in Florida) was a Polish-American historian and author.
- Holger Czukay (1938 in Danzig – 2017 in Weilerswist) was a German musician, co-founder of the krautrock group Can.
- Horst Ehmke (1927 in Danzig – 2017 in Bonn) was a German lawyer, law professor and SPD politician, served as Federal Minister of Justice (1969).
- Jörg-Peter Ewert (born 1938 in Danzig) is a German neurophysiologist and researcher into Neuroethology.
- Günter Grass (1927 in Danzig – 2015 in Lübeck) was a German novelist, poet, playwright, illustrator, graphic artist, sculptor, and recipient of the 1999 Nobel Prize in Literature.
- Ursula Happe (1926 in Danzig – 2021 in Dortmund) was a German swimmer and Olympic champion. She competed at the 1956 Summer Olympics and won the gold medal in 200 m breaststroke.
- Hans Albert Hohnfeldt (1897 in Neufahrwasser – 1948) Nazi Party Gauleiter in Danzig.
- Klaus Kinski (1926 in Zopot – 1991 in Lagunitas, California) was a controversial German actor.
- Wanda Klaff (1922 in Danzig – executed 1946 in Biskupia Górka) was a Nazi camp overseer.
- Heinz-Hermann Koelle (1925 in Danzig – 2011 in Berlin) was an aeronautical engineer, and made the preliminary designs for Saturn I.
- Erhard Krack (1931 in Danzig – 2000 in Berlin) was an East German politician and mayor of East Berlin from 1974 to 1990.
- Zdzisław Kuźniar (born 1931 in Gdańsk) is a Polish actor.
- Hanna-Renate Laurien (1928 in Danzig – 2010 in Berlin) was a German CDU politician.
- Jack Mandelbaum (1927 in Danzig – 2023 Naples, Florida) was a Holocaust survivor.
- Rupert Neudeck (1939 in Danzig – 2016 in Siegburg), correspondent for Deutschlandfunk and founder of Cap Anamur, a humanitarian organisation.
- Zygmunt Pawłowicz (1927 in Danzig – 2010 in Gdańsk) ordained a Catholic priest in 1952, was the Polish Auxiliary bishop of the Roman Catholic Archdiocese of Gdańsk from 1985 until 2005.
- Avi Pazner (born 1937 in Danzig) is a retired Israeli diplomat.
- Richard Pratt (1934 in Danzig – 2009 in Kew, Victoria) was a prominent Australian businessman, chairman of Visy. His family moved to Australia in 1938.
- Georg Preuß (1920 in Danzig – 1991 Clenze) was a mid-ranking commander in the Waffen-SS, a convicted war criminal.
- Meta Preuß (1903–1981), one of seven members of the Communist Party (Free City of Danzig), elected to the Volkstag in 1930.
- Henry Rosovsky (1927 in Danzig – 2022 in Cambridge, Massachusetts) was an economic historian, specializing in East Asia, born of Russian Jewish parents.
- Hermann Salomon (1938 in Danzig – 2020 in Mainz) was a German javelin thrower who competed in the 1960, 1964, and 1968 Summer Olympics.
- Meir Shamgar (1925 in Danzig – 2019 in Jerusalem) was President of the Israeli Supreme Court from 1983 to 1995.
- Zalman Shoval (born 1930 in Danzig) is an Israeli politician and diplomat.
- Arne Slettebak (1925 in Danzig – 1999 in Worthington, Ohio) was an American astronomer.
- Wolfgang Völz (1930 in Danzig – 2018 in Berlin) was a German actor, known for his roles in theatre plays, TV shows, feature films and taped radio shows.
- F. K. Waechter (1937 in Danzig – 2005 in Frankfurt) was a German cartoonist, author and playwright.
- David Dushman (1923 in Danzig – 2021 in Munich) was a Jewish-Soviet Red Army soldier who assisted in the liberation of the Auschwitz-Birkenau concentration camp.

=== Religion ===
In 1924, 54.7% of the populace was Protestant (220,731 persons, mostly Lutherans within the united old-Prussian church), 34.5% was Roman Catholic (140,797 persons), and 2.4% Jewish (9,239 persons). Other Protestants included 5,604 Mennonites, 1,934 Calvinists (Reformed), 1,093 Baptists, 410 Free Religionists. The population also included 2,129 dissenters, 1,394 faithful of other religions and denominations, and 664 irreligionists.

The Jewish community grew from 2,717 in 1910 to 7,282 in 1923 and 10,448 in 1929, many of them immigrants from Poland and Russia.

==== Regional Synodal Federation of the Free City of Danzig ====
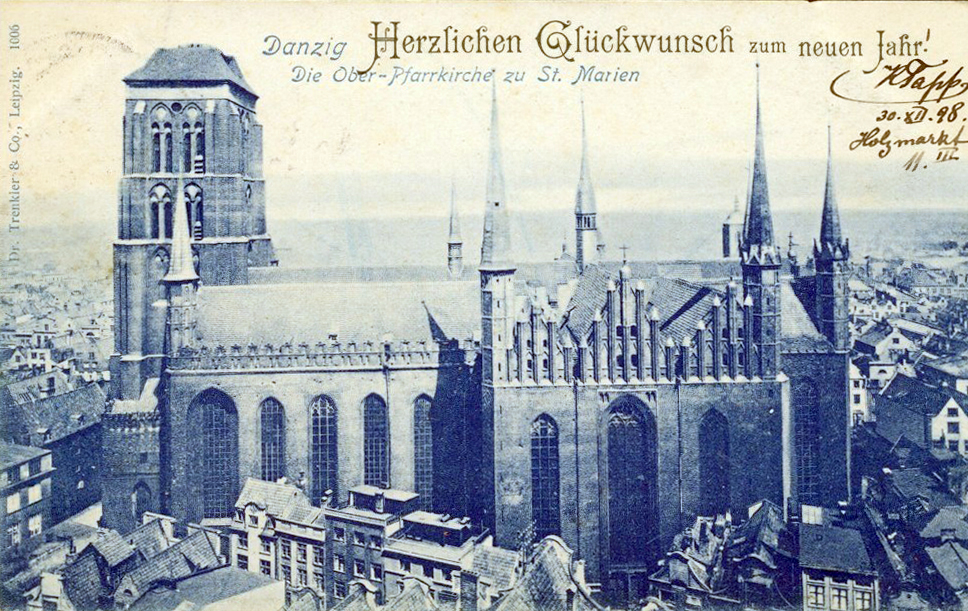
The Lutheran Supreme Parish Church of St. Mary's in Danzig's Rechtstadt quarter

The mostly Lutheran and partially Reformed congregations situated in the territory of the Free City, which previously used to belong to the Ecclesiastical Province of West Prussia of the Evangelical Church of the old-Prussian Union (EKapU), were transformed into the Regional Synodal Federation of the Free City of Danzig after 1920. The executive body of that ecclesiastical province, the consistory (est. 1 November 1886), was seated in Danzig. After 1920 it was restricted in its responsibility to those congregations within the Free City's territory. First General Superintendent Paul Kalweit (1920–1933) and then Bishop Johannes Beermann (1933–1945) presided over the consistory.

Unlike the Second Polish Republic, which opposed the cooperation of the United Evangelical Church in Poland with EKapU, Volkstag and the Senate of Danzig approved cross-border religious bodies. Danzig's Regional Synodal Federation — just as the regional synodal federation of the autonomous Memelland — retained the status of an ecclesiastical province within EKapU.

After the German annexation of the Free City in 1939, the EKapU merged the Danzig regional synodal federation in 1940 into the Ecclesiastical Region of Danzig-West Prussia. This included the Polish congregations of the United Evangelical Church in Poland in the homonymous Reichsgau Danzig-West Prussia and the German congregations in the West Prussia governorate. Danzig's consistory functioned as an executive body for that region. With the flight and expulsion of most ethnically German Protestant parishioners from the area of the Free City of Danzig between 1945 and 1948, the congregations vanished.

In March 1945, the consistory had relocated to Lübeck and opened a refugee centre for Danzigers (Hilfsstelle beim evangelischen Konsistorium Danzig) led by Upper Consistorial Councillor Gerhard M. Gülzow. The Lutheran congregation of St. Mary's Church could relocate its valuable parament collection and the presbytery granted it on loan to St. Annen Museum in Lübeck after the war. Other Lutheran congregations of Danzig could reclaim their church bells, which the Wehrmacht had requisitioned as non-ferrous metal for war purposes since 1940, but which had survived, not yet melted down, in storage (e.g., Glockenfriedhof) in the British zone of occupation. The presbyteries usually granted them to Northwestern German Lutheran congregations that had lost bells due to the war.

==== Diocese of Danzig of the Roman Catholic Church ====
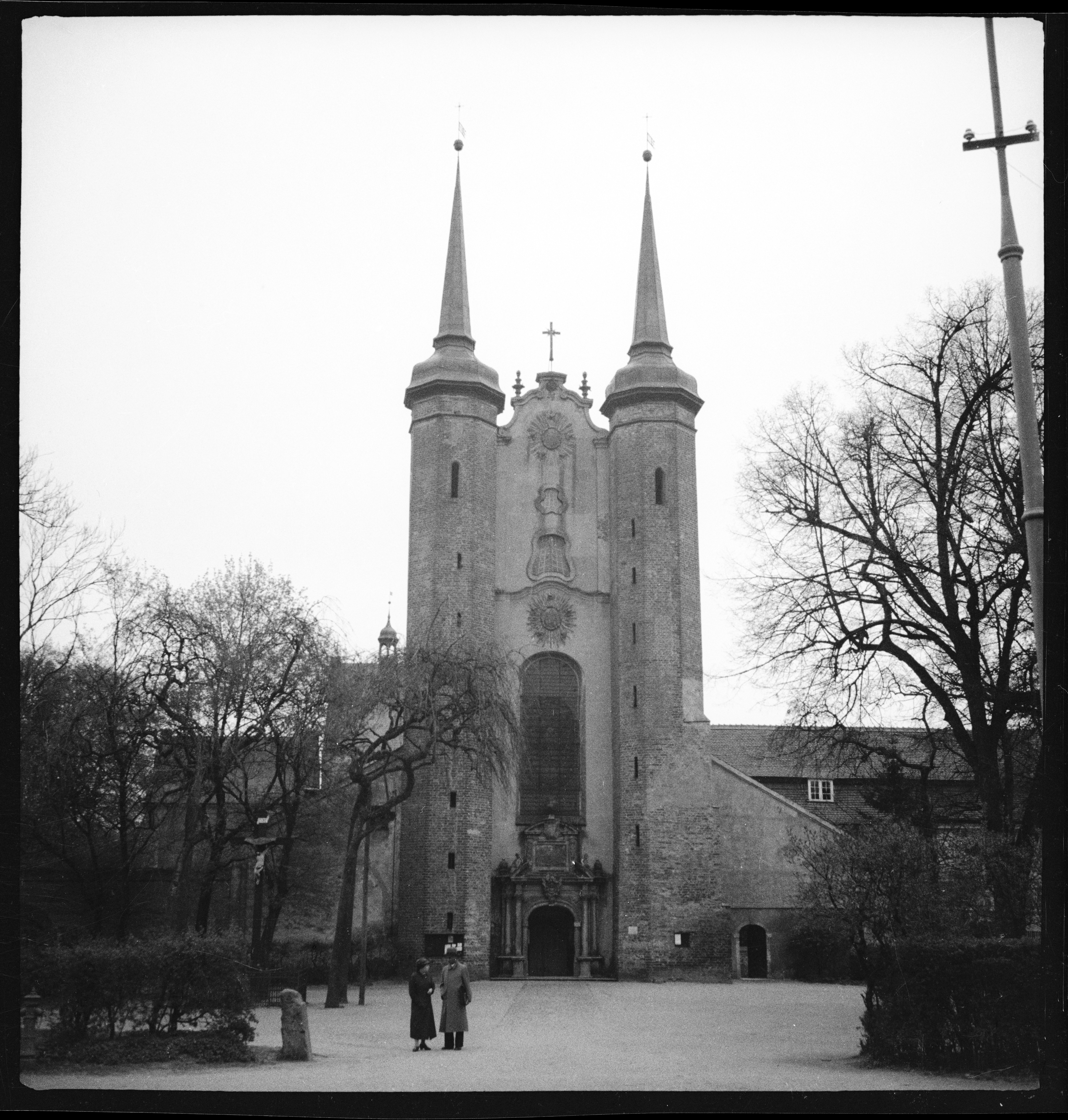
The Archcathedral of the Holy Trinity, Blessed Virgin Mary and Saint Bernard in Oliva, Danzig

The 36 Catholic parishes in the territory of the Free City in 1922 used to belong in equal shares to the Diocese of Culm, which was mostly Polish, and the Diocese of Ermland, which was mostly German. While the Second Polish Republic wanted all the parishes within the Free City to form part of Polish Culm, Volkstag and Senate wanted them all to become subject to German Ermland. In 1922 the Holy See suspended the jurisdictions of both dioceses over their parishes in the Free State and established an exempt apostolic administration for the territory.

The first apostolic administrator was Edward O'Rourke (born in Minsk and of Irish ancestry) who became Bishop of Danzig on the occasion of the elevation of the administration to an exempt diocese in 1925. He was naturalised as Danziger on the same occasion. In 1938 he resigned after quarrels with the Nazi-dominated Senate of Danzig on appointments of parish priests of Polish ethnicity. The senate also instigated the denaturalisation of O'Rourke, who subsequently became a Polish citizen. O'Rourke was succeeded by Bishop Carl Maria Splett, a native of the Free City area.

Splett remained bishop after the German annexation of the Free City. In early 1941, he applied for admitting the Danzig diocese as member in Archbishop Adolf Bertram's Eastern German Ecclesiastical Province and thus at the Fulda Conference of Bishops; however, Bertram, also speaker of the Fulda conference, rejected the request. Any arguments that the Free City of Danzig had been annexed to Nazi Germany did not impress Bertram since Danzig's annexation lacked international recognition. Until the reorganization of the Catholic dioceses in Danzig and the formerly eastern territories of Germany, the diocesan territory remained unaltered and the see exempt. However, with the replacement of Danzig's population between 1945 and 1948 by mostly Catholic Poles, the number of Catholic parishes increased and most formerly Protestant churches were taken over for Catholic services.

==== Jewish Danzigers ====
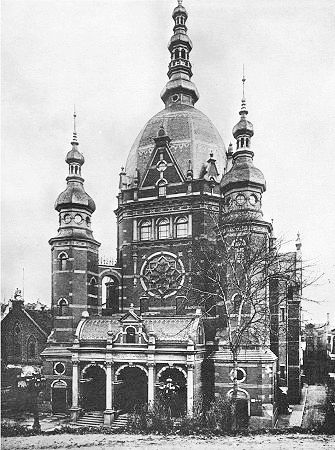
The Great Synagogue on Reitbahn Street in Danzig's Rechtstadt quarter

Since 1883, most of the Jewish congregations in the later territory of the Free State had merged into the Synagogal Community of Danzig. Only the Jews of Tiegenhof ran their own congregation until 1938.

Danzig became a centre of Polish and Russian Jewish emigration to North America. Between 1920 and 1925, 60,000 Jews emigrated via Danzig to the US and Canada. At the same time, between 1923 and 1929, Danzig's own Jewish population increased from roughly 7,000 to 10,500. Native Jews and newcomers established themselves in the city and contributed to its civic life, culture and economy. Danzig became a venue for international meetings of Jewish organisations, such as the convention of delegates from Jewish youth organisations of various nations, attended by David Ben-Gurion, which founded the World Union of Jewish Youth on 2 September 1924 in the Schützenhaus venue. On 21 March 1926, the Zionistische Organisation für Danzig convened delegates of Hechalutz from all over for the first conference in Danzig, using Hebrew as a common language, also attended by Ben Gurion.

With a Nazi majority in the Volkstag and Senate, anti-Semitic persecution and discrimination occurred unsanctioned by the authorities. In contrast to Germany, which exercised capital outflow control since 1931, emigration of Danzig's Jews was nonetheless somewhat easier, with capital transfers enabled by the Bank of Danzig. Moreover, the comparatively few Danzig Jews were offered easier refuge in safe countries because of favourable Free City migration quotas.

After the anti-Jewish riots of Kristallnacht of 9/10 November 1938 in Germany, similar riots took place on 12/13 November in Danzig. The Great Synagogue was taken over and demolished by the local authorities in 1939. Most Jews had already left the city, and the Jewish Community of Danzig decided to organise its own emigration in early 1939.

== Politics ==
=== Government ===
Flag of the Danzig Senate

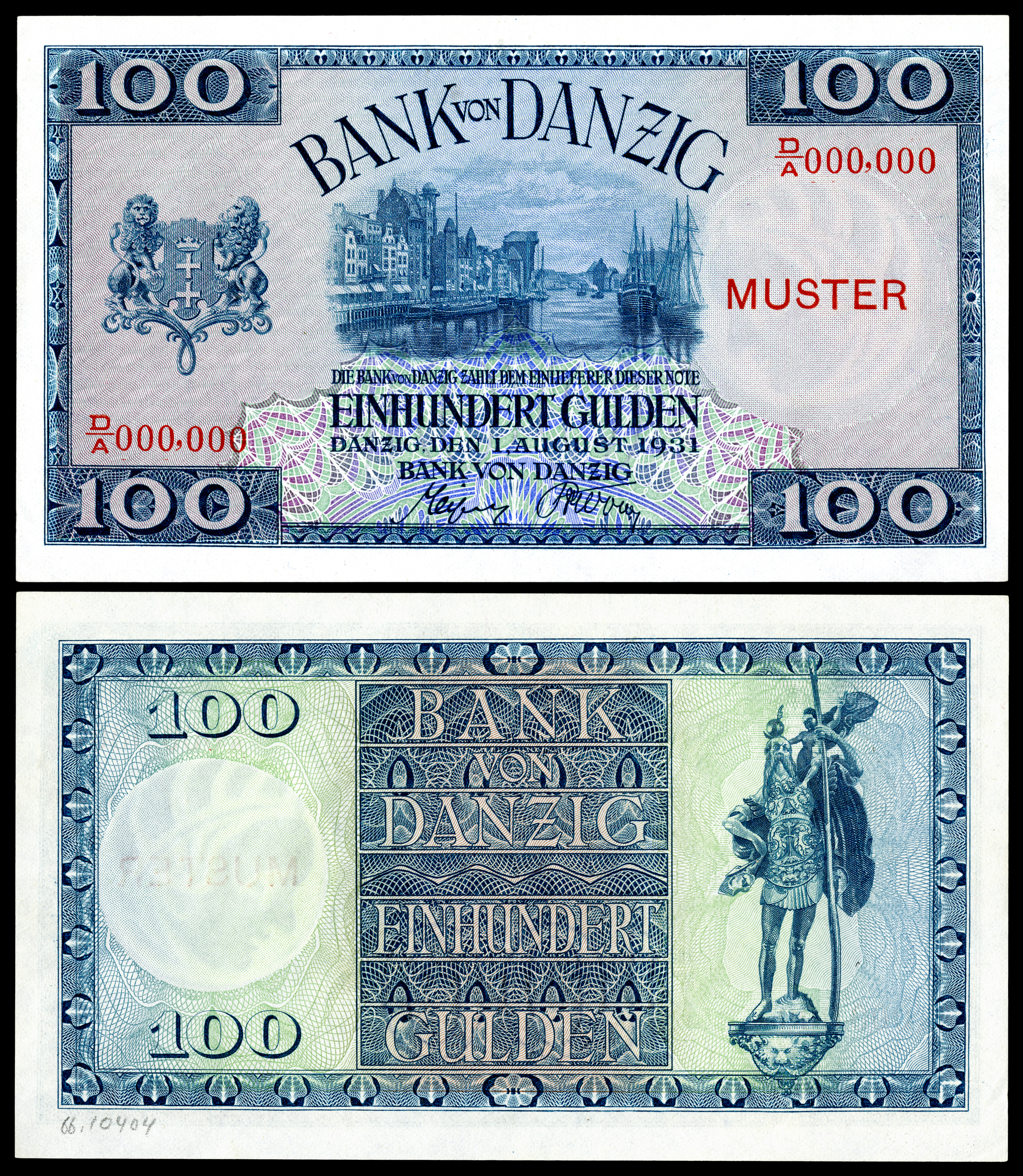
The Danzig coat of arms depicted on a 100 gulden note (1931)

Heads of State of the Free City of Danzig
No.	Portrait	Name (Born-Died)	Term of office			Political Party
No.	Portrait	Name (Born-Died)	Took office	Left office	Time in office	Political Party
Presidents of the Danzig Senate
1	Heinrich Sahm	Heinrich Sahm (1877–1939)	6 December 1920	10 January 1931	10 years, 35 days	Independent
2	Ernst Ziehm	Ernst Ziehm (1867–1962)	10 January 1931	20 June 1933	2 years, 161 days	DNVP
3	Hermann Rauschning	Hermann Rauschning (1887–1982)	20 June 1933	23 November 1934	1 year, 156 days	NSDAP
4	Arthur Greiser	Arthur Greiser (1897–1946)	23 November 1934	23 August 1939	4 years, 273 days	NSDAP
State President
5	Albert Forster	Albert Forster (1902–1952)	23 August 1939	1 September 1939	9 days	NSDAP

The Free City was governed by the Senate of the Free City of Danzig, which was elected by the parliament (Volkstag) for a legislative period of four years. The official language was German, although the usage of Polish was guaranteed by law. The political parties in the Free City corresponded with the political parties in Weimar Germany; the most influential parties in the 1920s were the conservative German National People's Party, the Social Democratic Party of the Free City of Danzig and the Catholic Centre Party. A Communist Party was founded in 1921 with its origins in the Spartacus League and the Communist Party of East Prussia. Several liberal parties and Free Voters' Associations existed and ran in the elections with varying success. A Polish Party represented the Polish minority and received between 3% (1933) and 6% (1920) of the vote (in total, 4,358 votes in 1933 and 9,321 votes in 1920).

Initially, the Nazi Party had only a small amount of success (0.8% of the vote in 1927) and was even briefly dissolved. Its influence grew with the onset of difficult economic times and the increasing popularity of the Nazi Party in Germany proper. Albert Forster became the Gauleiter in October 1930. The Nazis won 50% of the votes in the Volkstag elections of 28 May 1933, and took control of the Senate in June 1933, with Hermann Rauschning becoming President of the Senate of Danzig. In contrast to Germany, the Nazi Party was relatively weak in the Free City of Danzig, and remained unstable because of "furious factional struggles" which plagued the Nazi administration throughout its rule. The party membership was generally low, and the 1935 election in Danzig "amounted to an electoral defeat for the Nazis". The democratic opposition remained strong and was able to temporarily block the Nazi Gleichschaltung policies between 1935 and 1937. German Catholics were supportive of the Polish minority and most Danzig Poles voted for the Catholic Centre Party. Social Democrats were also willing to cooperate with Catholics and Poles, and the Catholic Church in Danzig was pro-Polish and opposed National Socialism.

Rauschning was removed from his position by Forster and replaced by Arthur Greiser in November 1934. He later appealed to the public not to vote for the Nazis in the 1935 elections. Political opposition to the Nazis was repressed with several politicians being imprisoned and murdered. The economic policy of Danzig's Nazi-led government, which increased the public expenditures for employment-creation programs and the retrenchment of financial aid from Germany led to a devaluation of more than 40% of the Danziger Gulden in 1935. The Gold reserves of the Bank of Danzig declined from 30 million Gulden in 1933 to 13 million in 1935 and the foreign asset reserve from 10 million to 250,000 Gulden. In 1935, Poland protested when Danzig's Senate reduced the value of the Gulden so that it would be the same as the Polish złoty.

As in Germany, the Nazis introduced laws mirroring the Enabling Act and Nuremberg laws (November 1938); existing parties and unions were gradually banned. The presence of the League of Nations, however, still guaranteed a minimum of legal certainty. In 1935, the opposition parties, except for the Polish Party, filed a lawsuit to the Danzig High Court in protest against the manipulation of the Volkstag elections. The opposition also protested to the League of Nations, as did the Jewish Community of Danzig. The number of members of the Nazi Party in Danzig increased from 21,861 in June 1934 to 48,345 in September 1938.

=== Foreign relations ===
Foreign relations were handled by the Second Polish Republic. In 1927, the Free City of Danzig sent a military advisory mission to Bolivia. The Bolivian government of Hernando Siles Reyes wanted to continue the pre-World War I German military mission, but the Treaty of Versailles prohibited that. The German officers, including Ernst Röhm, were transferred to the Danzig police force and then sent to Bolivia. In 1929, after problems with the mission, the British embassy handled the return of the German officers.

=== German-Polish tensions ===
The rights of the Second Polish Republic within the territory of the Free City were stipulated in the Treaty of Paris of 9 November 1920 and the Treaty of Warsaw of 24 October 1921. The details of the Polish privileges soon became a permanent matter of disputes between the local populace and the Polish State. While the representatives of the Free City tried to uphold the city's autonomy and sovereignty, Poland sought to extend its privileges.

Throughout the Polish–Soviet War, local dockworkers went on strike and refused to unload ammunition supplies for the Polish Army. While the ammunition was finally unloaded by British troops, the incident led to the establishment of a permanent ammunition depot at the Westerplatte and the construction of a trade and naval port in Gdynia, whose total exports and imports surpassed those of Danzig in May 1932. In December 1925, the Council of the League of Nations agreed to the establishment of a Polish military guard of 88 men on the Westerplatte peninsula to protect the war material depot.

During the interwar period, the Polish minority was heavily discriminated against by the German population, which openly attacked its members using racist slurs and harassment, and attacks against the Polish consulate by German students were praised by authorities. In June 1932, a crisis broke out when the Polish destroyer ORP Wicher was sent into Danzig harbour without the permission of the Senate to greet a visiting squadron of British destroyers. The crisis was resolved when the Free City granted more access rights to the Polish Navy in exchange for a promise to not take the Wicher back into Danzig harbour.

Several disputes between Danzig and Poland occurred in the sequel. The Free City protested against the Westerplatte depot, the placement of Polish letter boxes within the City and the presence of Polish war vessels at the harbour. The attempt of the Free City to join the International Labour Organization was rejected by the Permanent Court of International Justice at the League of Nations after protests of the Polish ILO delegate.

After Adolf Hitler came to power in Germany, the Polish military doubled the number of 88 troops at Westerplatte in order to test the reaction of the new chancellor. After protests, the additional troops were withdrawn. Nazi propaganda used these events in the Volkstag elections of May 1933, in which Nazis won an absolute majority.

Until June 1933, the High Commissioner decided in 66 cases of dispute between Danzig and Poland; in 54 cases, one of the parties appealed to the Permanent Court of International Justice. Subsequent disputes were resolved in direct negotiations between the Senate and Poland after both had agreed to abstain from further appeals to the International Court in the summer of 1933 and bilateral agreements were concluded.

In the aftermath of the German-Polish Non-Aggression Pact of 1934, Danzig–Polish relations improved and Adolf Hitler instructed the local Nazi government to cease anti-Polish actions. In return, Poland did not support the actions of the anti-Nazi opposition in Danzig. The Polish Ambassador to Germany, Józef Lipski, stated in a meeting with Hermann Göring

"[...] that a National Socialist Senate in Danzig is also most desirable from our point of view, since it brought about a rapprochement between the Free City and Poland, I would like to remind him that we have always kept aloof from internal Danzig problems. In spite of approaches repeatedly made by the opposition parties, we rejected any attempt to draw us into action against the Senate. I mentioned quite confidentially that the Polish minority in Danzig was advised not to join forces with the opposition at the time of elections."

When Carl J. Burckhardt became High Commissioner in February 1937, both Poles and Germans openly welcomed his withdrawal, and Polish Minister of Foreign Affairs Józef Beck notified him not to "count on the support of the Polish State" in the case of difficulties with the Senate or the Nazi Party.

While the Senate appeared to respect the agreements with Poland, the "Nazification of Danzig proceeded relentlessly" and Danzig became a springboard for anti-Polish propaganda among the German and Ukrainian minority in Poland. The Catholic Bishop of Danzig, Edward O'Rourke, was forced to withdraw after he had tried to implement four additional Polish nationals as parish priests in October 1937.

=== Danzig crisis ===
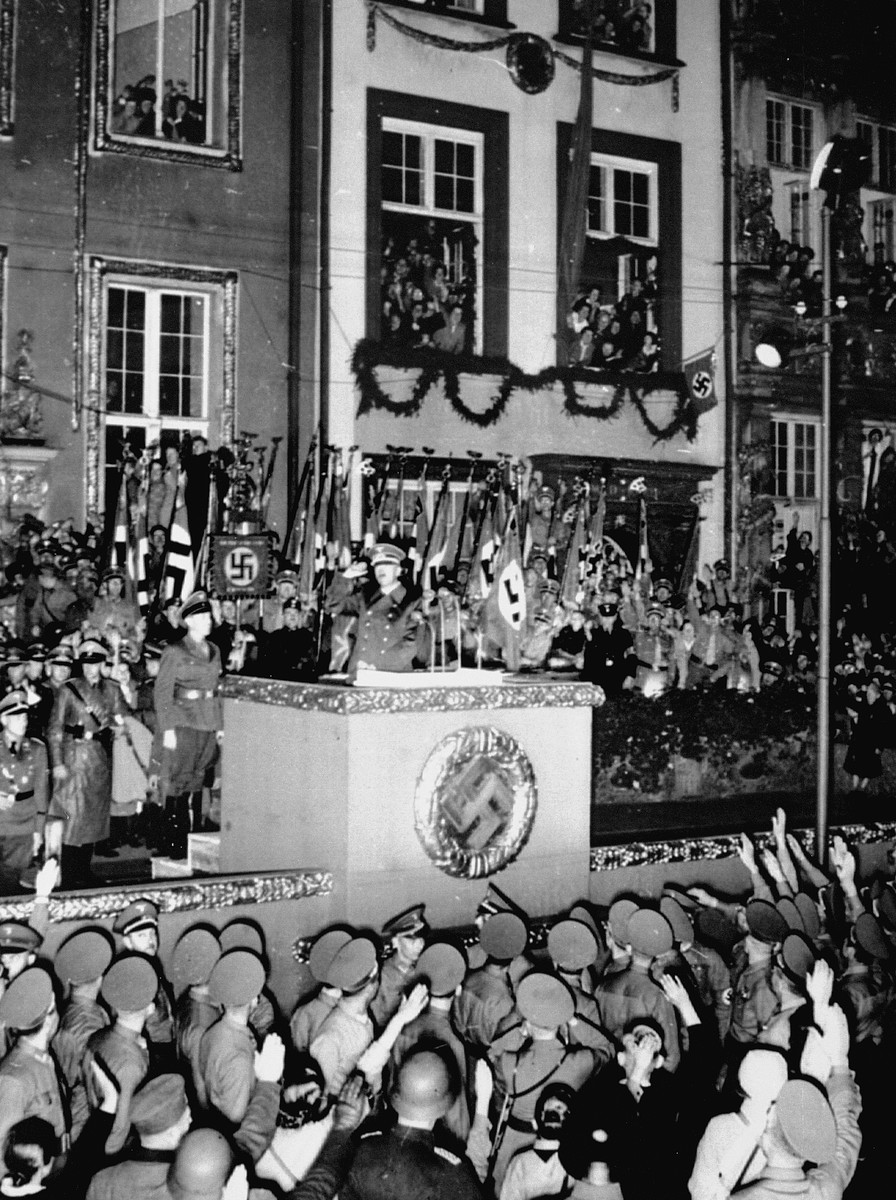
Hitler gives a speech in Danzig on 19 September 1939

The German policy openly changed immediately after the Munich Conference in October 1938, when German Minister of Foreign Affairs Joachim von Ribbentrop demanded the incorporation of the Free City into the Reich. The Polish ambassador to Germany, Józef Lipski, declined Ribbentrop's offer, saying that Polish public opinion would not tolerate the Free City joining Germany and predicated that if Warsaw allowed that to happen, then the Sanation military dictatorship that had ruled Poland since 1926 would be overthrown. Ernst von Weizsäcker on 29 March 1939 told the Danzig government the Reich would carry out a policy to the Zermürbungspolitik (point of destruction) towards Poland, saying a compromise solution was not wanted, and on 5 April 1939 told Hans-Adolf von Moltke under no conditions was he to negotiate with the Poles.

All through the spring and summer of 1939, there was a massive media campaign in Germany demanding the immediate return of the Free City of Danzig to Germany under the slogan "Home to the Reich!". However, the Danzig crisis was just a pretext for war. Ribbentrop ordered Count Hans-Adolf von Moltke, the German ambassador to Poland, not to negotiate with the Poles over Danzig as it was always Ribbentrop's great fear that the Poles might actually agree to the Free City returning to Germany, thereby depriving the Reich of its pretext for attacking Poland.

In the middle of August, Beck offered a concession, saying that Poland was willing to give up its control of Danzig's customs, a proposal which caused fury in Berlin. However, the leaders of the Free City sent a message to Berlin on 19 August 1939 saying: "Gauleiter Forster intends to extend claims [...] Should the Poles yield again it is intended to increase the claims further in order to make accord impossible". The same day a telegram from Berlin expressed approval with the proviso: "Discussions will have to be conducted and pressure exerted against Poland in such a way that responsibility for failure to come to an agreement and the consequences rest with Poland". On 23 August 1939, Albert Forster, the Gauleiter of Danzig, called a meeting of the Senate that voted to have the Free City rejoin Germany, raising tensions to the breaking point. The same meeting appointed Forster the Danzig State President, through this was due to Forster's long-running rivalry with Arthur Greiser, a völkisch fanatic who regarded Forster as too soft on the Poles. Both the appointment of Forster as State President and the resolution calling for the Free City to rejoin the Reich were violations of the charter the League of Nations had given Danzig in 1920, and the matter should have been taken to the League of Nations's Security Council for discussion.

Since these violations of the Danzig charter would have resulted in the League deposing Danzig's Nazi government, both the French and British prevented the matter from being referred to the Security Council. Instead, the British and French applied strong pressure on the Poles not to send in a military force to depose the Danzig government and appoint a mediator to resolve the crisis. By late August 1939, the crisis continued to escalate with the Senate confiscating on 27 August 1939 stocks of wheat, salt and petrol that belonged to the Polish businesses that were in the process of being exported or imported via the Free City, an action that led to sharp Polish complaints. The same day, 200 Polish workers at the Danzig shipyards were fired without severance pay and their identification papers revoked, meaning that they legally could not live in Danzig anymore. The Danzig government imposed food rationing, the Danzig newspapers took a militantly anti-Polish line, and almost every day there were "incidents" on the border with Poland. Ordinary people in Danzig were described as being highly worried in the last days of August 1939, as it became apparent that war was imminent.

In the meantime, the German battleship Schleswig-Holstein had arrived in Danzig on 15 August. Originally, it was planned to send the light cruiser Königsberg to Danzig for what was described as a "friendship visit", but it was decided at the last minute that a ship with more firepower was needed, leading to the Schleswig-Holstein with its 11-inch (280 mm) guns being substituted. Upon anchoring in Danzig harbor, the Schleswig-Holstein ominously aimed its guns at the Polish Military Depot on the Westerplatte peninsula in a provocative gesture that further raised the tensions in the Free City. At about 4:48 am on 1 September 1939, the Schleswig-Holstein opened fire on Westerplatte, firing the first shots of World War II.

== World War II and aftermath ==
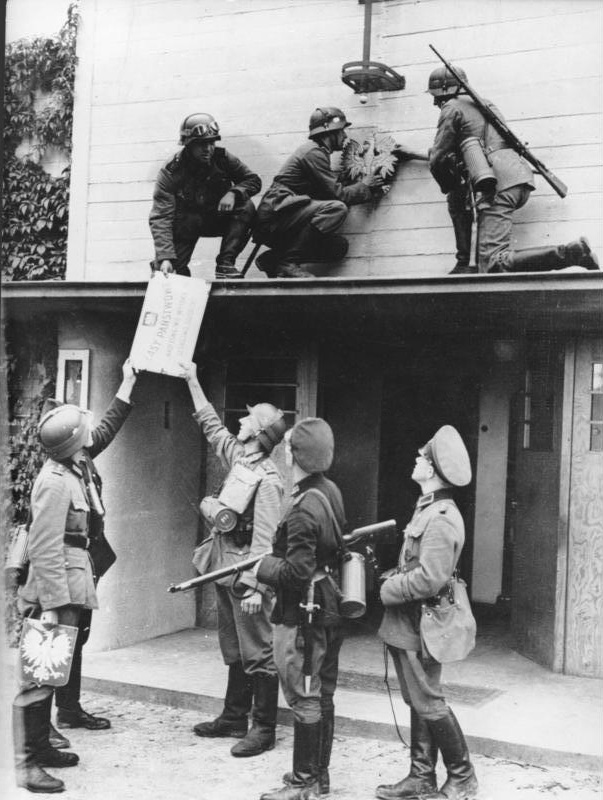
1 September 1939: Danzig police remove Polish insignia at the Polish–Danzig border near Zoppot

On 1 September 1939, the day of the German invasion of the Free City of Danzig, Forster signed a law declaring the Free City to be incorporated into Germany. On the same day, Hitler signed a law declaring the law signed by Forster to be German law and the Free City of Danzig was officially incorporated into Germany.

The Polish garrison of Westerplatte held out until 7 September.

Danzig served as a key arrival port in the Nazi-organised resettlement of Baltic Germans under the Heim ins Reich program, where ethnic German evacuees were ceremonially received as part of the regime's propagandised "homecoming" to the Reich.

Up to 4,500 members of the Polish minority were arrested with many of them executed. In the city itself hundreds of Polish prisoners were subjected to cruel executions and experiments, which included castration of men and sterilization of women considered dangerous to the "purity of Nordic race" and beheading by guillotine. The judicial system was one of the main tools of extermination policy towards Poles led by Nazi Germany in the city and verdicts were motivated by statements that Poles were subhuman.

By the end of World War II, nearly all of the city had been reduced to ruins. On 30 March 1945, the city was taken by the Red Army.

At the Yalta Conference in February 1945, the Allies agreed that the city would become part of Poland. No formal treaty has ever altered the status of the Free City of Danzig, and its incorporation into Poland has rested upon the general acquiescence of the international community. Subsequently, several groups proclaimed they represented the Free City of Danzig Government in Exile, a continuation of the state.

The expulsion of the pre-war inhabitants started already before the decisions of the Potsdam Conference of August 1945. From June to October, an estimated number of 60,000 residents were expelled by Polish authorities, often units of the Polish Armed Forces, the Polish State Security and the Milicja Obywatelska encircled certain areas and forced the inhabitants to make room for newly arrived Polish settlers. About 20,000 Germans left on their own and by late 1945, between 10,000 and 15,000 pre-war inhabitants remained.

By 1950, 13,424 citizens of the former Free City had been "verified" and granted Polish citizenship. By 1947, 126,472 Danzigers of German ethnicity were expelled to Germany from Gdańsk, and 101,873 Poles from Central Poland and 26,629 from Soviet-annexed Eastern Poland took their place (these figures refer to the city of Gdańsk itself, not to the whole area of pre-war Free City).

=== Origin of the post-war population ===
During the Polish post-war census of December 1950, data about the pre-war places of residence of the inhabitants as of August 1939 were collected. In the case of children born between September 1939 and December 1950, their origin was reported based on the pre-war places of residence of their mothers. Thanks to this data it is possible to reconstruct the pre-war geographical origin of the post-war population. The same territory which corresponded to the pre-war Free City of Danzig was inhabited in December 1950 by:

1950 population by place of residence back in 1939:
Region (within 1939 borders):	Number	Percent
Autochthons (1939 DE/FCD citizens)	35,311	12,1%
Polish expellees from Kresy (USSR)	55,599	19,0%
Poles from abroad except the USSR	2,213	0,8%
Resettlers from the City of Warsaw	19,322	6,6%
From Warsaw region (Masovia)	22,574	7,7%
From Białystok region and Sudovia	7,638	2,6%
From pre-war Polish Pomerania	72,847	24,9%
Resettlers from Poznań region	10,371	3,5%
Katowice region (East Upper Silesia)	2,982	1,0%
Resettlers from the City of Łódź	2,850	1,0%
Resettlers from Łódź region	7,465	2,6%
Resettlers from Kielce region	16,252	5,6%
Resettlers from Lublin region	19,002	6,5%
Resettlers from Kraków region	5,278	1,8%
Resettlers from Rzeszów region	6,200	2,1%
place of residence in 1939 unknown	6,559	2,2%
Total pop. in December 1950	292,463	100,0%

At least 85% of the population as of December 1950 were post-war newcomers, but over 10% of inhabitants were still pre-war Danzigers (most of them members of pre-war Polish and Kashubian minorities in the Free City of Danzig). Another 25% came from neighbouring areas of pre-war Polish Pomerania. Almost 20% were Poles from areas of former Eastern Poland annexed by the USSR (many from Wilno Voivodeship). Several percent came from the city of Warsaw, which had been largely destroyed in 1944.

== See also ==
- Administrations of Danzig before April 1945
- Alfons Flisykowski – Polish murder victim
- Allgemeiner Arbeiterverband der Freien Stadt Danzig – Former trade union
- Areas annexed by Nazi Germany – European lands annexed by Germany before and during WWII
- Danzig Corridor
- Danzig Research Society – Scientific society (1743–1936)
- Free City of Trieste (disambiguation)
- History of Gdańsk
- Shanghai International Settlement – Merged conceded territories (1863–1941)
