= Nec temere, nec timide =

Latin phrase

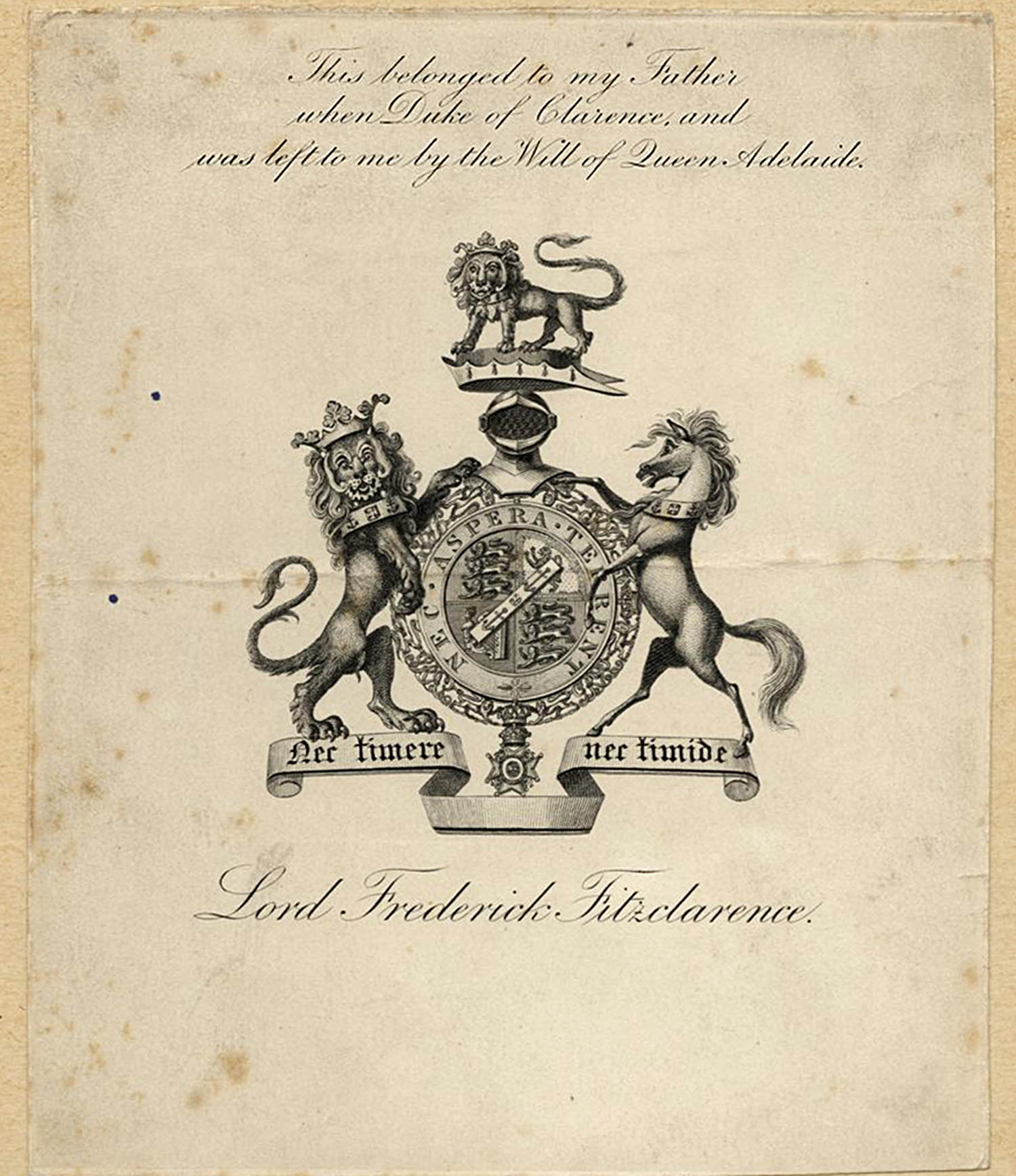
Bookplate of Lord Frederick FitzClarence with the motto Nec temere, nec timide

Nec temere, nec timide is a Latin phrase that translates to 'Neither rashly nor timidly'. Its exact origin is unknown, although Aristotle in Ethica Nicomachea, Book III, mentions that the virtuous man is not temerarious nor timorous, but courageous. It is best known as the motto of the Dano-Norwegian naval hero Niels Juel, who supposedly used it first at the dawn of July 1, 1677, just before the Battle of Køge Bay.

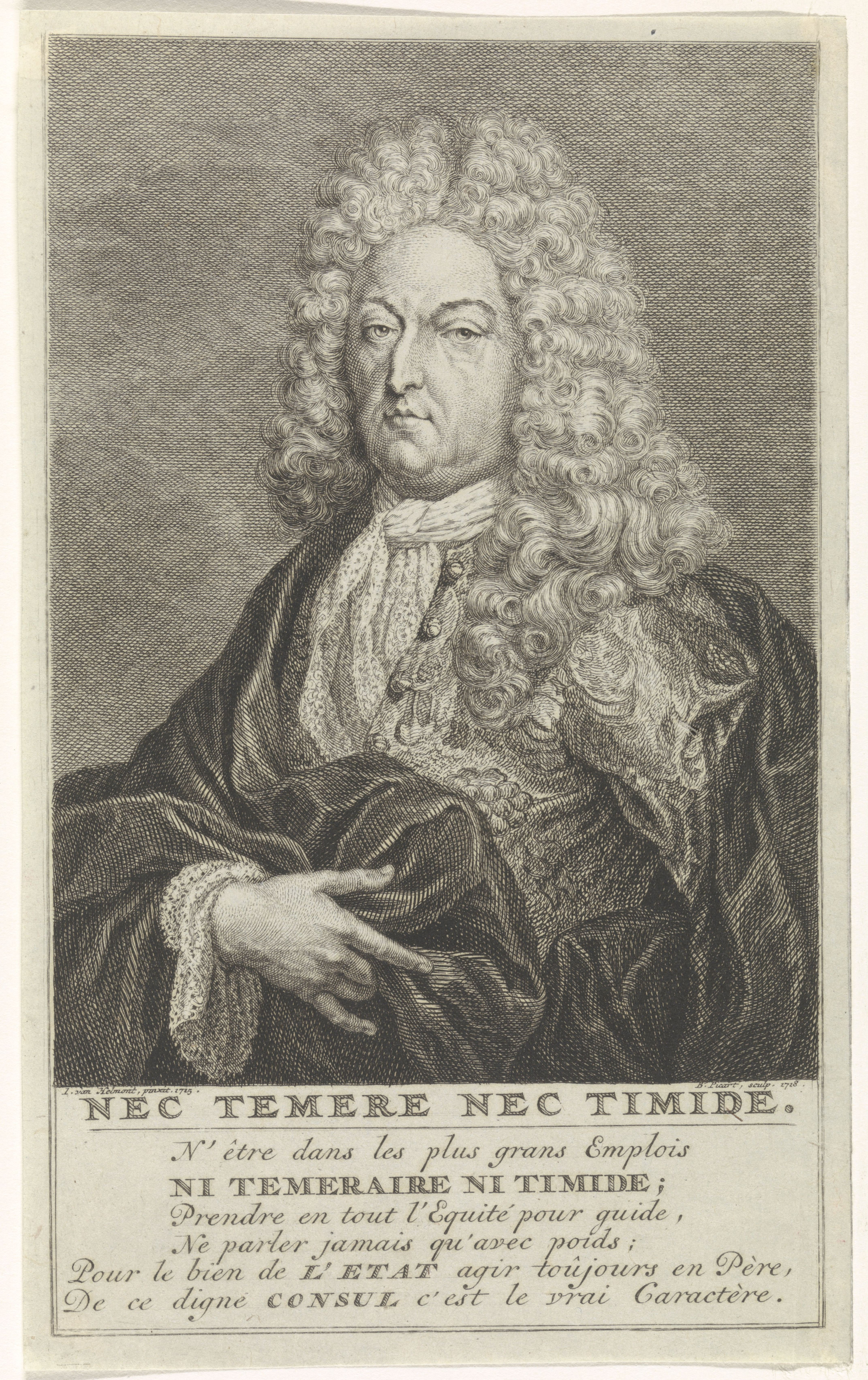
Nec temere, nec timide, motto of Dutch pensionary Bruno van der Dussen

The phrase has been used as a motto by armigerous families such as Bent, Buckley, and Sherbourne, as well as individuals including the Williams-Bulkeley baronets and Charles Western, 1st Baron Western.

Today, it is used as a motto by various institutions, including:

- The Royal Danish Naval Academy
- The former English borough of Oswestry, in Shropshire
- The Dutch air assault brigade 11th Airmobile Brigade (Netherlands).
- Appleby College
- Cottrell Old Yankee Ale
- The Michigan Exploration Laboratory
- The Royal Quebec Golf Club
- The Bulkeley Hotel, Beaumaris
- National Paramount Services, LLP, US
- The city of Gdańsk, Poland.
- Free City of Danzig, 1920–1939
- Free City of Danzig Government in Exile
