= Allgemeiner =

Allgemeiner means general in the German language. It may refer to:

- A synonym for Furmint grapes
- Allgemeiner Arbeiterverband der Freien Stadt Danzig, a former trade union
- Allgemeiner Deutscher Arbeiterverein, a political party
- Allgemeiner Deutscher Automobil-Club (ADAC), a German car club
- Allgemeiner Deutscher Fahrrad-Club, a German cycling group
- Allgemeiner Deutscher Musikverein, a music association
- Allgemeiner Deutscher Nachrichtendienst, a German state news agency
- Allgemeiner Studierendenausschuss (AStA), a German students' union

== See also ==
- Frankfurter Allgemeine Zeitung, German newspaper
- Allgemeine Deutsche Biographie
- Allgemeine SS
- Abitur exam
