= Danzig gulden =

Currency of the Free City of Danzig between 1923 and 1939

Danziger Gulden (German); Gulden gdański (Polish)
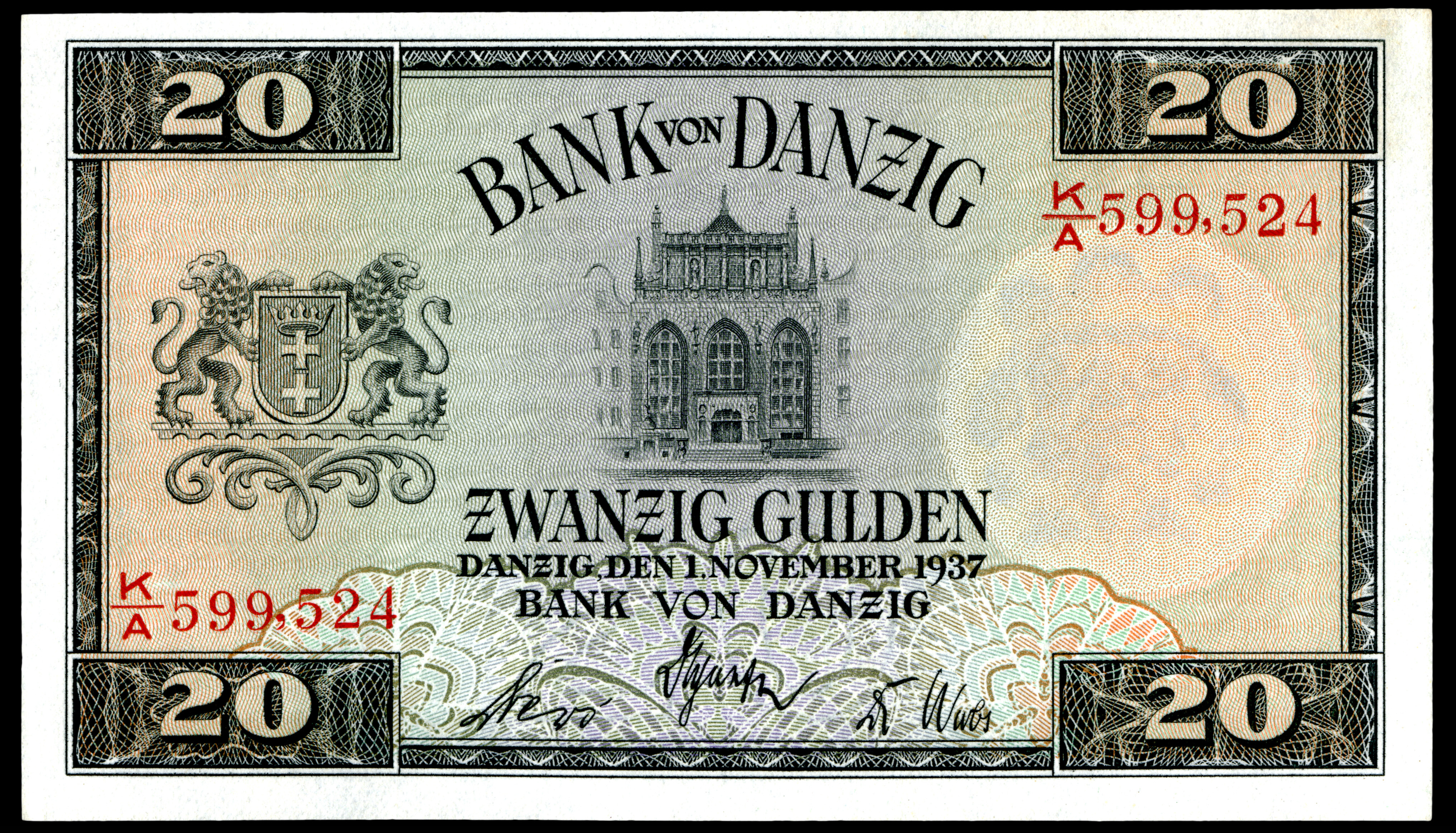
20 gulden (1937)
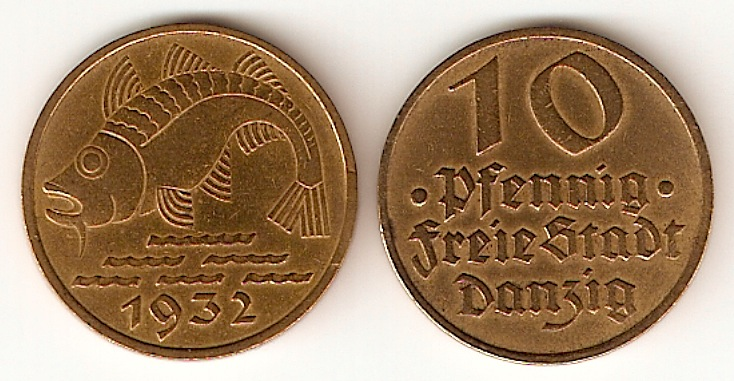
10 pfennig coin

Units of account
- Plural: Gulden
- Subunit
- 1/100: Pfennig
- Plural
- Pfennig: Pfennig

Denominations
- Banknotes: 10, 20, 25, 50, 100, 500, 1000 Gulden
- Coins: 1, 2, 5, 10 Pfennig; 1/2, 1, 2, 5, 10, 25 Gulden

Demographics
- User(s): Free City of Danzig

Issuance
- Central bank: Bank of Danzig
- This infobox shows the latest status before this currency was rendered obsolete.

The gulden, divided into 100 Pfennig, was the currency of the Free City of Danzig from 1923 to 1939.

== History ==
From 1914 to 1923, Danzig used the German Papiermark and issued several local 'emergency notes'. Inflation during 1922–23 averaged roughly 2,440% per month. In July 1923 it was announced that a new and independent currency (the gulden) was being established with the approval of the League of Nations finance committee to replace the German mark. The gulden was introduced at a value of 25 gulden = 1 pound sterling, or 9.6d sterling per gulden.

=== Incorporation into Nazi Germany ===
Danzig, separated from Germany after World War I, was annexed by Nazi Germany on 1 September 1939, the day the invasion of Poland had begun On the same day reichsmark coins and notes were declared legal tender alongside the Danzig gulden, with 1 gulden being equal to 70 reichspfennig (0.70 reichsmark). This was a favourable exchange rate for inhabitants of Danzig, since the actual exchange rate was around 47 reichspfennig per gulden. To prevent abuse on 7 September the import of gulden coins and notes into the territory of the former free city was prohibited. Bank assets were however converted at the market rate of 47 reichspfennig per gulden.

With effect on 7 September 1939, coins of 1 and 2 pfennige became legal tender throughout Nazi Germany as 1 and 2 reichspfennige, and would remain in circulation until November 1940. On 30 September the reichsmark became the sole currency on the territory of the former free city. Notes and coins of 5 and 10 gulden were withdrawn that day and could be exchanged for reichsmarks until 15 October. Coins of 5 and 10 pfennig and 1/2 and 1 gulden remained in circulation until 25 June 1940 and were redeemed until 25 July.

== Coins ==
The first series of coins was issued in 1923, followed by a second in 1932. Coins were issued in denominations of 1, 2, 5 and 10 pfennige and 1/2, 1, 2, 5, 10 and 25 gulden.

The 25-gulden coins were minted in gold. Produced in very small numbers in 1923 (1,000) and 1930 (4,000), the latter date's issue was only released as a few presentation pieces. As part of the 1923 series are 200 proof coins and, while available to collectors, are very expensive. The 1930 issue was essentially unobtainable until a large number appeared in the 1990s, apparently released from a Russian treasury where they had been stored since their capture at the end of World War II.

First series (1923)
| Image | Value | Technical parameters | | | Description | | | | Date of | | | |
| Image | Value | Diameter | Mass | Composition | Edge | Obverse | Reverse | quantity minted | minting | issue | withdrawal | lapse |
|---|---|---|---|---|---|---|---|---|---|---|---|---|
| | 1 pfennig | 17 mm | 1.67 g | 95% Cu, 4% Sn, 1% Zn | Plain | Value, country name Danzig | Year, Civic arms | 11,500,000 | 1923–1937 | 18 December 1923 | 1 November 1940 | 30 November 1940 |
| | 2 pfennige | 19.5 mm | 2.5 g | 95% Cu, 4% Sn, 1% Zn | Plain | Value, country name Danzig | Year, Civic arms | 3,250,000 | 1923–1937 | 18 December 1923 | 1 November 1940 | 30 November 1940 |
| | 5 pfennige | 17.5 mm | 2.0 g | 75% Cu, 25% Ni | Plain | Value, country name Danzig | Year, Civic arms surrounded by a six-pointed trace italienne | 4,000,000 | 1923, 1928 | 18 December 1923 | 1 October 1932 | ? |
| | 10 pfennige | 21.5 mm | 4.0 g | 75% Cu, 25% Ni | Plain | Value, country name Freie Stadt Danzig | Year, Civic arms surrounded by a six-pointed trace italienne | 5,000,000 | 1923 | 18 December 1923 | 1 October 1932 | ? |
| | 1/2 gulden | 19.5 mm | 2.5 g | 75% Ag, 25% Cu | 1/2, 1 Reeded. 2,5 Plain | Value, country name Freie Stadt Danzig, civic arms | cog | 1,400,000 | 1923, 1927 | 18 December 1923 | 1 April 1932 | ? |
| | 1 gulden | 23.5 mm | 5.0 g | 75% Ag, 25% Cu | 1/2, 1 Reeded. 2,5 Plain | Value, country name Freie Stadt Danzig, cog | City arms with two lions as supporters | 3,500,500 | 1923 | 18 December 1923 | 1 April 1932 | ? |
| | 2 gulden | 26.5 mm | 10.0 g | 75% Ag, 25% Cu | 1/2, 1 Reeded. 2,5 Plain | Value, country name Freie Stadt Danzig, cog | City arms with two lions as supporters | 1,250,000 | 1923 | 18 December 1923 | 1 April 1932 | ? |
| | 5 gulden | 35.0 mm | 25.0 g | 75% Ag, 25% Cu | 1/2, 1 Reeded. 2,5 Plain | Value, country name Freie Stadt Danzig, St. Mary's Church | City arms with two lions as supporters | 860,500 | 1923, 1927 | 18 December 1923 | 1 April 1932 | ? |
These images are to scale at 2.5 pixels per millimetre. For table standards, see the coin specification table.

== Banknotes ==
The first Danzig gulden banknotes were issued by the Danzig Central Finance Department and dated 22 October 1923 with a second issue dated 1 November 1923. Denominations for both series included 1, 2, 5, 10, 25, and 50-pfennige notes, as well as 1, 2, and 5 gulden. In addition, the first issue contained 10 and 25-gulden notes, and the second issue contained 50 and 100-gulden notes. The Bank of Danzig was capitalized with £300,000 on 5 February 1924 and officially opened on 17 March 1924. The Bank of Danzig issued four series of gulden (1924, 1928–30, 1931–32, and 1937–38) with an initial issue date of 10 February 1924.

Banknotes of Danzig
| Issued by | Issue | Value | Image | Comments |
|---|---|---|---|---|
| Danzig Central Finance Department | 1923 first series | 1 pfennig | | |
| Danzig Central Finance Department | 1923 first series | 2 pfennige | | |
| Danzig Central Finance Department | 1923 first series | 5 pfennige | | |
| Danzig Central Finance Department | 1923 first series | 10 pfennige | | |
| Danzig Central Finance Department | 1923 first series | 25 pfennige | | |
| Danzig Central Finance Department | 1923 first series | 50 pfennige | | |
| Danzig Central Finance Department | 1923 first series | 1 gulden | | |
| Danzig Central Finance Department | 1923 first series | 2 gulden | | |
| Danzig Central Finance Department | 1923 first series | 5 gulden | | |
| Danzig Central Finance Department | 1923 first series | 10 gulden | | |
| Danzig Central Finance Department | 1923 first series | 25 gulden | | |
| Danzig Central Finance Department | 1923 second series | 1 pfennig | | |
| Danzig Central Finance Department | 1923 second series | 2 pfennige | | |
| Danzig Central Finance Department | 1923 second series | 5 pfennige | | |
| Danzig Central Finance Department | 1923 second series | 10 pfennige | | |
| Danzig Central Finance Department | 1923 second series | 25 pfennige | | |
| Danzig Central Finance Department | 1923 second series | 50 pfennige | | |
| Danzig Central Finance Department | 1923 second series | 1 gulden | | |
| Danzig Central Finance Department | 1923 second series | 2 gulden | | |
| Danzig Central Finance Department | 1923 second series | 5 gulden | | |
| Danzig Central Finance Department | 1923 second series | 50 gulden | | |
| Danzig Central Finance Department | 1923 second series | 100 gulden | | |
| Bank of Danzig | 1924 | 10 gulden | | |
| Bank of Danzig | 1924 | 25 gulden | | |
| Bank of Danzig | 1924 | 100 gulden | | |
| Bank of Danzig | 1924 | 500 gulden | | Zeughaus (arsenal) |
| Bank of Danzig | 1924 | 1,000 gulden | | City Hall |
| Bank of Danzig | 1928–30 | 10 gulden | | Artus Court |
| Bank of Danzig | 1928–30 | 25 gulden | | St. Mary's Church |
| Bank of Danzig | 1931–32 | 20 gulden | | Stockturm (local tower) part of Golden Gate (Gdańsk); Neptune |
| Bank of Danzig | 1931–32 | 25 gulden | | St. Mary's Church |
| Bank of Danzig | 1931–32 | 100 gulden | | Motława River dock scene |
| Bank of Danzig | 1937–38 | 20 gulden | | Artus Court |
| Bank of Danzig | 1937–38 | 50 gulden | | Vorlaubenhaus |
