= Für Danzig =

Official anthem of the Free City of Danzig

English: For Danzig
- Former city anthem of Gdańsk, Poland
- Also known as: „Dla Gdańska” (English: 'For Gdańsk')
- Lyrics: Paul Enderling
- Music: Georg Göhler
- Adopted: 1920
- Relinquished: 1939

Audio sample
- 1934 recording of „Für Danzig“ in A major: file; help

"For Danzig" was the official anthem of the Free City of Danzig (now Gdańsk, Poland), used between 1920 and 1939. (Note: Another song, "In Danzig", was also a semi-official anthem of the Free City, which had lyrics by Josef von Eichendorff set to the traditional tune.) The lyrics were written by Paul Enderling, while the music was by Georg Göhler.

After the invasion of Poland and the concurrent annexation of Danzig by Nazi Germany in 1939, "Deutschlandlied" was adopted as the official anthem, along with the "Horst-Wessel-Lied".

== Lyrics ==
German original

Kennst du die Stadt am Bernsteinstrand,
umgrünt von ew'ger Wälder Band,
wo schlanke Giebel streben
empor zum Sonnenschein!

Refrain:
Ja, sollt' ich fröhlich leben,
in Danzig müßt es sein!

Kennst du die Stadt, wo Turm an Turm
in Treue trotzt dem Zeitensturm,
wo stolze Schiffe gleiten
ins blaue Meer hinein!

Refrain:
Ja, sollt' ich tapfer streiten,
für Danzig müßt es sein!

Kennst du die Stadt, wo deutsche Art
voll Kraft und Mut ihr Gut bewahrt,
wo deutsch die Glocken werben
und deutsch ein jeder Stein!

Refrain:
Ja, sollt' ich selig sterben,
in Danzig müßt es sein!

Polish version

Znasz-li ten gród nad bursztynowym brzegiem,
odwiecznych borów spowity szeregiem,
gród w starej baśni poczęty
wśród aureoli świętej?

Refren:
Jeśli szczęśliwy mam być, to w Gdańsku
to w Gdańsku muszę żyć!

Znasz-li ten gród, gdzie wieża przy wieży,
wiernie stróżuje u wieków rubieży,
gdzie dumne okręty płyną
nad modrą wód głębiną?

Refren:
Gdy przyjdzie bojowy zew, dla Gdańska
dla Gdańska dam chętnie krew!

Znasz-li ten gród, na którego bramie,
niemieckich skarbów mężne strzeże ramię?
gdzie na niemiecką gloryją
niemieckich skarbów mężne strzeże ramię?

Refren:
Gdy śmierć zabierze mnie, to w Gdańsku
w Gdańsku umierać chcę!

English translation

D'you know the city on the amber beach,
wreathed by green forests divine?
Where slender gables stretch
upward towards the sunshine!

Refrain:
Yes, I shall live happily
in Danzig it must be!

D'you know the city, where tower after tower
braves the storms of time loyally?
Where proud ships glide
towards the blue sea!

Refrain:
Yes, I shall fight bravely
for Danzig it must be!

D'you know the city, where German kind
defends its wealth with might and main?
where the bells ring in German
and ev'ry stone is German!

Refrain:
Yes, I shall die blessedly,
in Danzig it must be!
