= Bank of Danzig =

Central bank of the Free City of Danzig

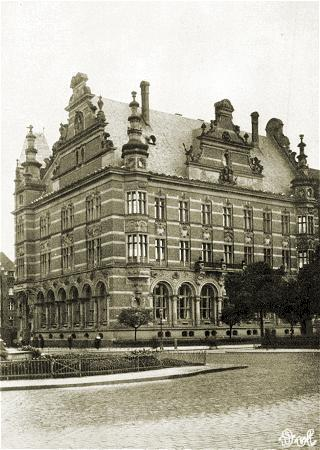
Head office building of the Bank of Danzig, former local branch of the Reichsbank

The Bank of Danzig (German: Bank von Danzig) was the central bank of the Free City of Danzig, established in 1924 and liquidated in the aftermath of the Danzig crisis in 1939.

== Overview ==
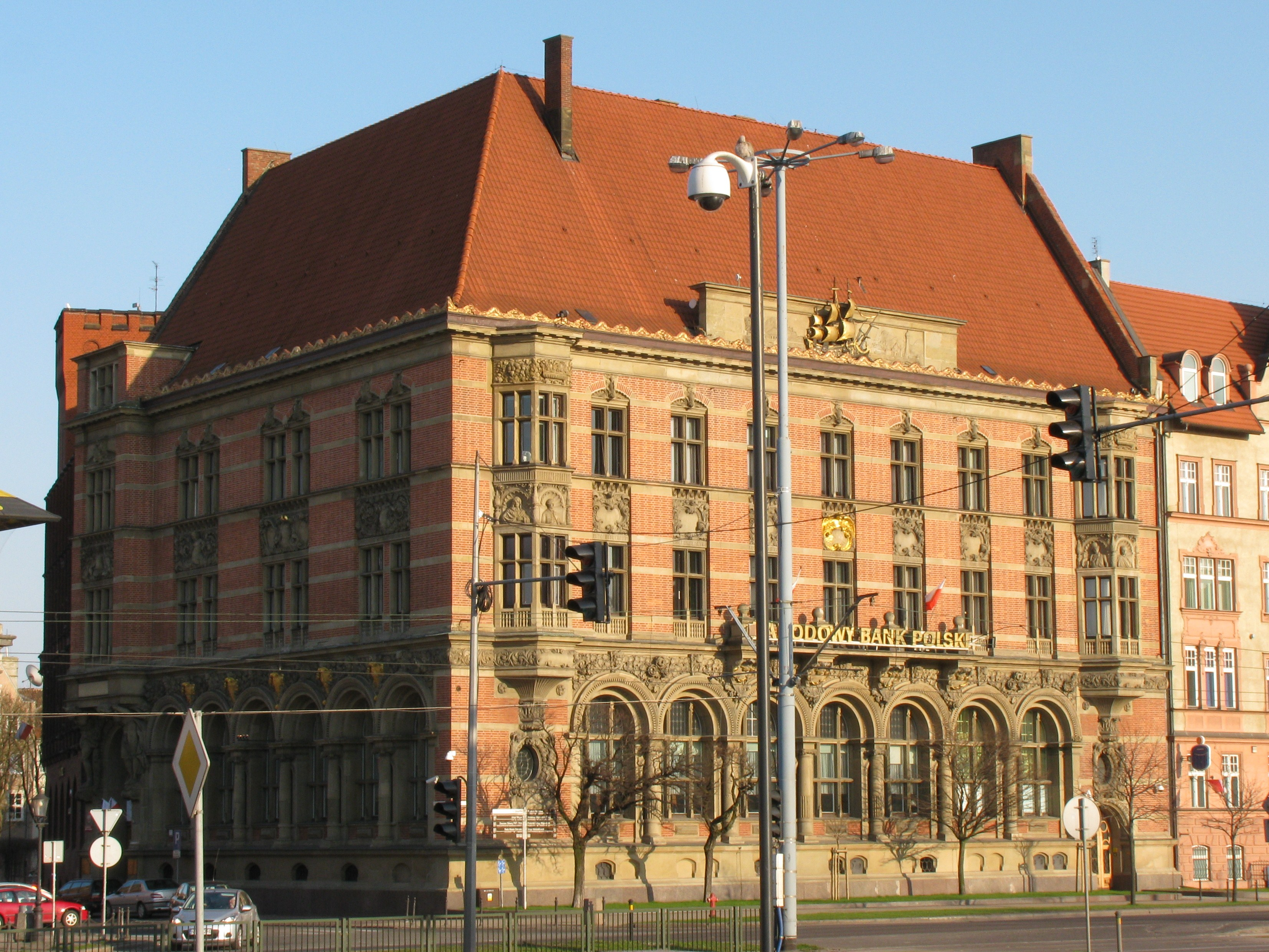
The former Bank of Danzig building, photographed in 2010

In the immediate aftermath of World War I, a currency union was planned to complement the customs union between Danzig and the nascent Polish state. The Polish National Loan Bank, Poland's provisional central bank, opened a branch to that effect in the city-state, while the latter's monetary needs were still served by the local branch of the Reichsbank. Because of hyperinflation in both Germany and Poland, however, that project failed to come to fruition, and it was abandoned in September 1923.

The Bank of Danzig was created under the conditions of the stabilization loan coordinated by the Economic and Financial Organization of the League of Nations in 1923–1924, based on the successful precedent of Austria a year earlier. It was established on 5 February 1924 with a capital of 7.5 million guldens, after the Reichsbank had ceased operations in the Free City on 31 December 1923. Its investors were private businesspeople and companies, including a consortium of Polish banks. It soon started operations on 17 March 1924. It issued the Danzig gulden, which replaced the Reichsmark which had been devalued by hyperinflation.

After the annexation of Danzig by the German Reich in September 1939, the Reichsmark was introduced in Danzig and the Bank of Danzig was liquidated, similarly as the Austrian National Bank had been following Anschluss in 1938. The bulk of the bank's gold holdings, which served as currency cover and were mainly stored at the Bank of England in London, were immobilized by the British government.

== Aftermath ==
The bank's building again served as a branch of the Reichsbank from 1939 to 1945, when it was badly damaged by wartime bombing. After 1945 it has been used by the National Bank of Poland.

In 1976, the United Kingdom handed over the Bank of Danzig's immobilized gold to Poland, which had annexed Danzig in 1945.

== Leadership ==
The bank's first Governor was Konrad Meissner, then Walter Bredow, then Carl-Anton Schaefer from 1933. The chairman of the supervisory board was Carl William Klawitter, and after the latter's death in 1929, Ernst Plagemann.

== See also ==
- Danzig gulden
- Hamburger Bank
