= Georg Preuß =

Georg Preuss
- Born: 24 April 1920; Danzig, Weimar Republic
- Died: 3 February 1991 (aged 70); Clenze, Germany
- Military career
- Allegiance: Nazi Germany
- Branch: Waffen-SS
- Service years: 1939–1945
- Rank: Hauptsturmführer
- Unit: 1st SS Division Leibstandarte SS Adolf Hitler
- Conflicts: World War II
- Awards: Knight's Cross of the Iron Cross
- Other work: engineer

Georg Preuß (24 April 1920 – 3 February 1991) was a mid-ranking commander in the Waffen-SS of Nazi Germany during World War II. He was a convicted war criminal.

== SS service ==
Preuß was born in Danzig. At the age of 13 he joined the Hitlerjugend and in 1937, while he was still attending school, he joined the Schutzstaffel (SS). After his graduation he applied for full-time service in the SS. In April 1939 he was accepted into the Leibstandarte Adolf Hitler (LSSAH). From August 1940 he attended the Junkerschule (SS officer training school) in Brunswick and became an Untersturmführer the following year.

From 1941 to 1943 Preuß fought with the LSSAH in the German war against the Soviet Union. He became a protégé of Jochen Peiper, who appreciated Preuß' obedience. But Preuß was unpopular among his comrades and had a reputation for sacrificing his men in combat. With the rank of Obersturmführer Preuß became commander of the 12th company in Peiper's III. Bataillon. While the LSSAH was in Italy during the late summer of 1943, Preuß became commandant of an internment camp for foreigners in Borgo San Dalmazzo, where his company was deployed. The internees were mainly Jews, which the SS had rounded up to later be deported to Auschwitz concentration camp via Drancy internment camp.

Under Peiper's command Preuß participated in the Battle of the Bulge in 1944/45. For his actions he was awarded a Knight's Cross of the Iron Cross on 5 February 1945. Historian Jens Westemeier considers the award for Preuß as a "bad joke", because Preuß had lost his way several times during the campaign, run into ambushes and lost half of his company. Although Preuß had not distinguished himself with autonomous decisions, which would have been a prerequisite to be considered for a Knight's Cross, Peiper recommended him by claiming that Preuß had been largely responsible for the unit's success. Peiper also claimed that Preuß had "finished" off an American soldier on the watch in close combat.

== War crimes trial ==
In 1946 Preuß was among the SS men who were put to trial for the Malmedy massacre. He was accused of murdering American prisoners of war and Belgian civilians. One of his subordinates, Ernst Kilat, who would eventually be tried and sentenced for murder of Belgian civilians in Liège in 1948, testified in 1945 that as a company commander Preuß had ordered his men to kill all Belgian civilians the unit came across. During the Malmedy massacre trial it was shown that Preuß had not killed an American soldier in close combat, as he had claimed, but had ordered one of his subordinates to shoot a captured American pilot whose pants and wedding ring he wanted for himself. For this murder in connection with robbery Preuß was sentenced to death. His death sentence was commuted to life in prison by U.S. military governor Lucius D. Clay in 1949.

While in prison Preuß got married in 1948. His petitions for parole were repeatedly turned down, until finally granted in late 1956. Preuß was released from Landsberg Prison on 30 November 1956. He then applied for service in the Bundeswehr, but was turned down. He went on to work as an engineer in Hamburg and died on welfare.

== Awards ==
- Close Combat Clasp in Gold on 1 April 1945 for up to 60 days in close combat
- Infantry Assault Badge in Silver
- Wound Badge in Gold
- German Cross in Gold on 1 April 1945 as SS-Hauptsturmführer in the III./SS-Panzergrenadier-Regiment 2 "Leibstandarte SS Adolf Hitler"
- Knight's Cross of the Iron Cross on 5 February 1945 as SS-Obersturmführer and leader in the 10.(gp.)/SS-Panzergrenadier-Regiment 2 "Leibstandarte SS Adolf Hitler"
