= Allgemeiner Arbeiterverband der Freien Stadt Danzig =

Former trade union

Allgemeiner Arbeiterverband der Freien Stadt Danzig ('General Labour Union of the Free City of Danzig') was a trade union centre in the Free City of Danzig. It was an affiliate of the International Federation of Trade Unions 1933-1936.

Arbeiterverband took a somewhat militant position of opposition to the growing influence of National Socialism amongst the German population of Danzig. The organization was repressed by National Socialist authorities in December 1935. Partly the clampdown was motivated by a frustration amongst the National Socialists over the decline in membership of their own German Labour Front in the city.
