= Free City of Danzig Government in Exile =

Self-declared governments in exile

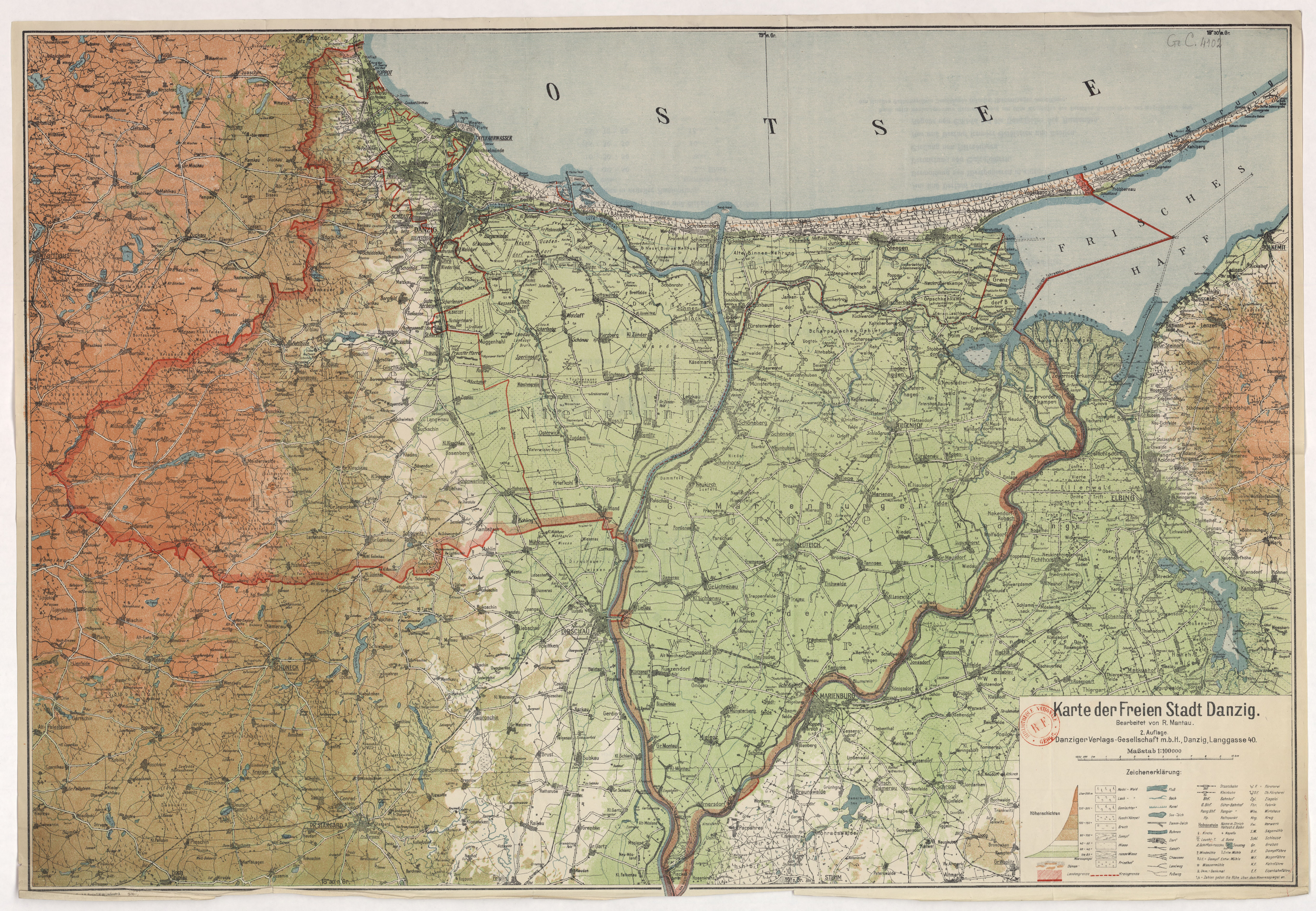
Map of the Free City of Danzig existing in the years 1920-1939

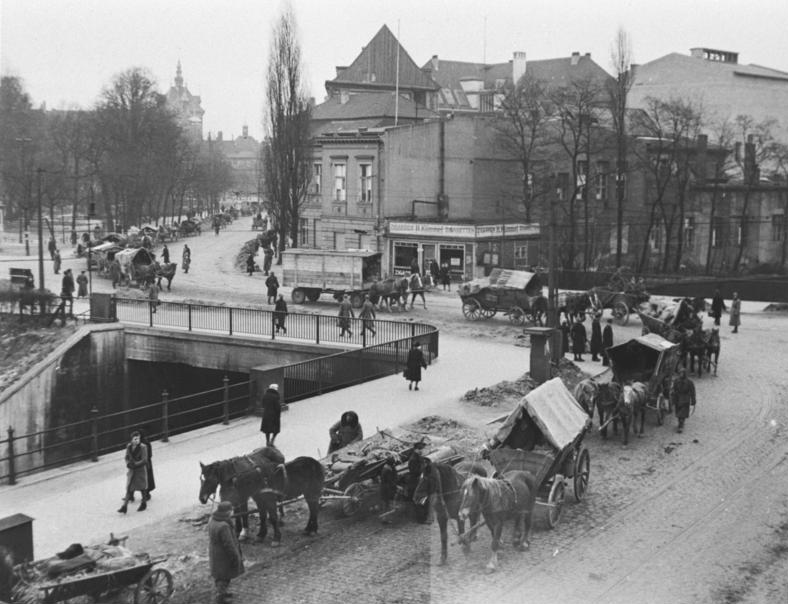
German refugees leaving Danzig, February 1945

The Free City of Danzig Government in Exile (German: Regierung der Freien Stadt Danzig im Exil) or the Free State of Danzig, is a title claimed by various groups claiming to be the government in exile of the defunct Free City of Danzig, whose former territory now lies in Poland, around the area of the city of Gdańsk.

== Background ==
The Free City of Danzig (German: Freie Stadt Danzig; Polish: Wolne Miasto Gdańsk) was a semi-autonomous city-state that existed between 1920 and 1939, consisting of the Baltic Sea port of Danzig (now Gdańsk, Poland) and nearly 200 towns in the surrounding areas. It was created on 15 November 1920 in accordance with the 1919 Treaty of Versailles after the end of World War I and was under League of Nations protection. The Free City was primarily inhabited by ethnic Germans but the majority fled or were expelled when the territory was incorporated into Poland at the conclusion of World War II.

== History ==
On 13 November 1947, W. Richter, the chairman of the Association of Nationals of Danzig Free State was one of the first groups that announced a formation of a government in exile for the Free City of Danzig. Richter also announced that the association would accept a settlement from the international community that would grant them an alternative territory in a centre of commerce. One of these groups made pleas to the United Nations, calling for official recognition, the deportation of Poles from its claimed territory, and assistance in re-establishing the Free City.

By 1967 at least two other groups had emerged claiming to be the government in exile. Herbet Adler, a tram conductor from Essen, claimed to be the President of the Exile Government of the Republic of the Free City of Danzig (German: Präsident der Exil-Regierung der Republik Freie Stadt Danzig) and sent diplomatic letters to various countries and politicians and received replies from the government of Ghana and West Germany's Minister of the Interior, Paul Lücke. He claimed the support of around 12,000 "compatriots" and stated he was a member of the government in exile, which consisted of 25 citizens located all over the world.

Willi Homeier however was part of a rival group and claimed to be president of the Representation of the Free City of Danzig (German: Vertretung der Freien Stadt Danzig) an off-shoot of the Council of Danzig (German: Rat der Danziger) founded in 1947. This council considered itself the legislature of the Free City and had 36 members in its first term of office. She also claimed that the body she led was the legal successor of the Senate of the Free City of Danzig and this had been recognised in secret ballots in 1951 and 1961.

With the advent of the Internet many more groups and individuals emerged claiming to be or represent the true government in exile. This includes Ernst F. Kriesner who at least by the late 1990s while living in Australia claimed to be a senator and the foreign affairs minister of the Free State. He also wrote to the United Nations seeking recognition in 1998. By at least 2010, Beowulf von Prince claimed to be president of the Senate of the Free State of Danzig, under the constitution of the original Free City of Danzig. In October 2017, von Prince was convicted in Switzerland for forging a passport and a number plate ("FDA-01 DA") that he claimed were validly issued by the Administrative Association of the Free City of Danzig (German: Verwaltungsgemeinschaft Freie Stadt Danzig).

== Claims ==
Many of the groups claim the entirety of the territory once possessed by the Free City of Danzig. Most base this claim upon the notion that the Free City of Danzig was a neutral state and that its annexation by Germany in 1939 was illegal; as such, the Allies had no authority in incorporating the city into Poland after World War II. In addition to this, no formal treaty has ever altered the status of the Free City of Danzig, and they argue its incorporation into Poland has rested upon the general acquiescence of the international community.

== Recognition and relations ==
Writing on the lack of official German recognition of the Free City of Danzig, Polish foreign minister Władysław Bartoszewski stated that the organization and like-minded Danzig cultural associations were seen in the eyes of the German public as revanchist and politically aligned with the far-right National Democratic Party of Germany.

== See also ==
- Reichsbürger movement
- List of states with limited recognition
- Micronation
