= Free City of Trieste =

Free City of Trieste may refer to:

- Imperial Free City of Trieste (1382–1809, 1849–1922), a free city of the Holy Roman Empire and later Austro-Hungarian Empire
- Free Territory of Trieste (1947–1955), a sovereign state of the early Cold War, finally divided between Italy and Yugoslavia
