= Flag of Gdańsk =

Polish municipal flag

Gdańsk
- Use: City flag
- Proportion: 5:8
- Adopted: 1 August 1996; 30 years ago
- Design: A golden crown and two white crosses aligned vertically, on the hoist side of a solid red field.
- Use: Another used drawing variant
- Proportion: 5:8
- Adopted: unofficial
- Use: Flag with full Coat of Arms
- Proportion: 5:8
- Adopted: unofficial

The flag of Gdańsk features a golden five-point crown and two square white crosses, all arranged vertically on the hoist side of a 5:8 aspect ratio flag. The flag, in various forms, has represented the early medieval Polish city of Gdańsk since the 13th century. It was formally adopted by the Gdańsk City Council in its current form for the first time on 1 August 1996.

The two crosses appeared in multiple variations in nearly all flags that have been used to represent the city, and the royal five-pointed crown was added after King of Poland Casimir IV granted the privilege of using it in May 1457. The crown and crosses have traditionally been positioned one-third of the way across the length of the flag, from the hoist side, in order to make them more visible when the flag was waving.

After the flag was not used during and after World War II, the practice was briefly departed from when the City Council approved an official flag in December 1991 which had the design elements in the center. This was changed back by another resolution in August 1996, and affirmed in 2001 with another statute after the first had expired.

== History ==
The idea of a flag for Gdańsk can be traced to the 13th century, as some ships flew banners that were similar in design to some elements representing the city, though the low quality of the drawings and reproductions make precise identification difficult. The two crosses present on the flag likely originate from a gonfanon flown on the stern of some of these ships. The crosses were originally arranged side-by-side, on a red swallowtail banner, though by the second half of the 13th century the layout was changed to a rectangular flag in a vertical orientation with one cross above the other, similar to that of Elbląg, another port city, whose flag was identical save for the top half, which was white with a red cross. This rectangular flag was used by troops fighting in the Battle of Grunwald, which took place in 1410, as is noted in the work of the historian Jan Długosz. It was also used by ships of the time, including the Peter von Danzig, a large carrack in the fleet of the Hanseatic League.

The flag's history is similar to that of the city's coat of arms, as its escutcheon is identical in design to the flag. After the privilege was granted by Casimir IV, King of Poland, on 25 May 1457, the city added a golden crown to its arms, which was also reflected in the city's flags. The flag itself has changed shape over time as well, keeping the rectangle but changing from a vertically-oriented one to a more traditional horizontally-oriented one. From the time the flag was expanded horizontally, the crown and crosses have been positioned closer to the hoist of the flag than to the fly; this was done intentionally so that they would be more visible when the flag was blowing in the wind.

The specific design of the elements of the flag has varied mildly with each depiction; a near-identical design was used by the Free City of Danzig established during the Napoleonic Wars in 1807. This city-state also had a trade flag, which consisted of a red field with a white stripe on the leftmost site of the flag, and the city's coat of arms in the upper-left corner. It also had a customs flag, which was a red field with the coat of arms surrounded by leaves. The similarly-named Free City of Danzig, this one established in 1920, used another near-identical design for its flag.

While under the control of Nazi Germany during World War II, the use of the city flag in Gdańsk was discontinued. After the war, the Polish People's Republic did not restore use of the flag. The city flag was officially adopted by the Gdańsk City Council on 10 December 1991, with the crown and crosses arranged vertically in the center of a red field. This flag proved rather unpopular, however, and was rarely flown apart from on some occasions by municipal authorities. The current flag took effect for the first time on 1 August 1996, with a City Council resolution that moved the emblems back to their traditional place on the hoist side of the flag. This resolution later expired but was renewed by another statute in 2001, with the flag design unchanged.

Hanseatic flag (c. 13th–15th centuries)

Flag of the Free City of Danzig (1807–1814)

Flag of the Free City of Danzig (1920–1939)

Flag of Gdańsk (1991–1996)

=== Other historical flags ===
Banner of the Commandery of Danzig, flown during the battle of Grunwald in 1410

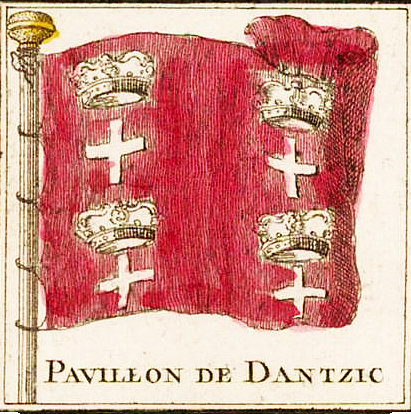
Flag signed as belonging to Gdańsk appearing in 18th century publications.

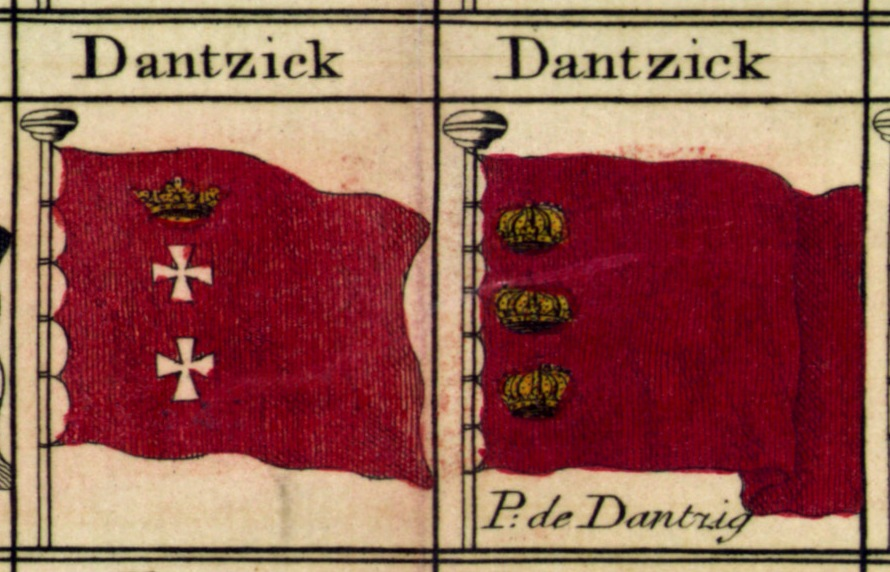

State Ensign of the Free City of Danzig Dienstflagge (1920–1939)

Flag of the Senate of the Free City of Danzig Senatsflagge (1920–1939)

Postal flag and Ensign of the Free City of Danzig Postflagge (1920–1939)

Pilot flag of the Free City of Danzig Lotsenflagge (1920–1939)

Harbour Authorities' flag in Free City of Danzig (1920–1939)

Customs' pennant of the Free City of Danzig Zollstander (1920–1939)

Police Pennant of the Free City of Danzig (1920–1939)

Flag of police in Free City of Danzig Danziger Polizei (c. 1937–1939)

Flag of the SS Heimwehr Danzig (1939–1940)

House flag of the Gdansk Shipyard, notably used during the 1980 strikes, and flown during the signing of the Gdańsk Agreement.

Other flags associated with the second Free City of Danzig used the flag in their own designs; the flag of the postal service was identical to the city flag save for a post horn added in the lower-right corner. The police and customs pennants were similar; the former was a green pennant banner with the crown and crosses on a red background, all within a small yellow circle on the hoist side of the flag, while the latter was also a pennant, with a green border, red interior, and the emblems on the hoist side. The pilot jack was identical to the city flag, but for a thick white border, similar to that of the Pilot Jack variation of the Union Jack. The Senate also had its own standard, this flag could be used by all members of the Senate to mark their vehicles when traveling in them for official purposes.

== Design and symbolism ==
Escutcheon-only version of the city's coat of arms

The current flag consists of a red field, with a gold five-pointed crown above two white crosses, arranged vertically. The emblems are identical to those found in the city's coat of arms, and are positioned closer to the hoist side of the flag, with the vertical axis in the center of the emblems positioned exactly one-third of the length of the flag away from the hoist edge of the flag. The flag uses a 5:8 aspect ratio. Unlike in some other versions of the device, the upper cross does not enter the crown, but rather is positioned below it; this is also reflected on the city's arms. The royal crown represents the permission given by King Casimir IV, while the crosses can represent both the Hanseatic League and Christianity. The red color of the flag's field was a popular Hanseatic color, and also represents the right to use red wax that was given to authorities in Gdańsk by the King.

== See also ==
- List of Polish flags
