= Hans Friedemann Götze =

Hans Friedemann Goetze
- Born: 3 November 1897; Rendsburg, Schleswig-Holstein, German Empire
- Died: 27 May 1940 (aged 42); Le Paradis, France
- Military career
- Allegiance: German Empire (to 1918); Weimar Republic (to 1922); Nazi Germany
- Branch: Waffen-SS
- Service years: 1914-1940
- Rank: SS-Standartenführer
- Commands: SS Heimwehr Danzig; SS-Totenkopf Infanterie Regiment 3
- Conflicts: World War I World War II
- Awards: Iron Cross, 1st class

Hans Friedemann Goetze (3 November 1897 – 27 May 1940) was a Nazi Standartenführer (Colonel) of the German Waffen-SS and commander of SS Heimwehr Danzig (Danzig Home Defence). He was a son of SS-Brigadeführer Friedemann Goetze. He was shot and killed by a British sniper while leading Infanterie Regiment 3 of the 3rd SS Division Totenkopf near Le Paradis. Following the battle, the British soldiers who were taken prisoner were killed during the Le Paradis massacre.

About 1550 members of the SS Heimwehr Danzig took part in an attack on the Polish Post Office in Danzig. On 8 September 1939, members of the SS Heimwehr Danzig killed 33 Polish civilians in the village of Ksiazki.

From April 1939 to April 1940, some members of his military unit took part in a mass murder near the Forest of Szpęgawsk.

== Summary of his military career ==
=== Dates of rank ===
- SS-Hauptsturmführer - 15 May 1937
- SS-Sturmbannführer - 12 September 1937
- SS-Obersturmbannführer - 20 April 1939
- SS-Standartenführer - 1 September 1939

=== Notable decorations ===
- Honour Cross of the World War 1914/1918
- Wound Badge in Black
- Iron Cross Second Class
- Iron Cross First Class
- Baltic Cross
- Reichs Sport Badge in Gold
- Clasp to the Iron Cross Second Class
- Horsemans Badge in Bronze
- Danzig Cross, 1st and 2nd Class
- SA Sport Badge

Military offices
| Preceded by none | Commander of SS Heimwehr Danzig; July 1939 - 29 September 1939 | Succeeded by none |
| Preceded by none | Commander of Infanterie Regiment 3, 3rd SS Division Totenkopf; 6 October 1939 - 3 June 1940 | Succeeded by SS-Standartenführer Matthias Kleinheisterkamp |
