= Piotr Chrapkowski =

Polish handball player (born 1988)

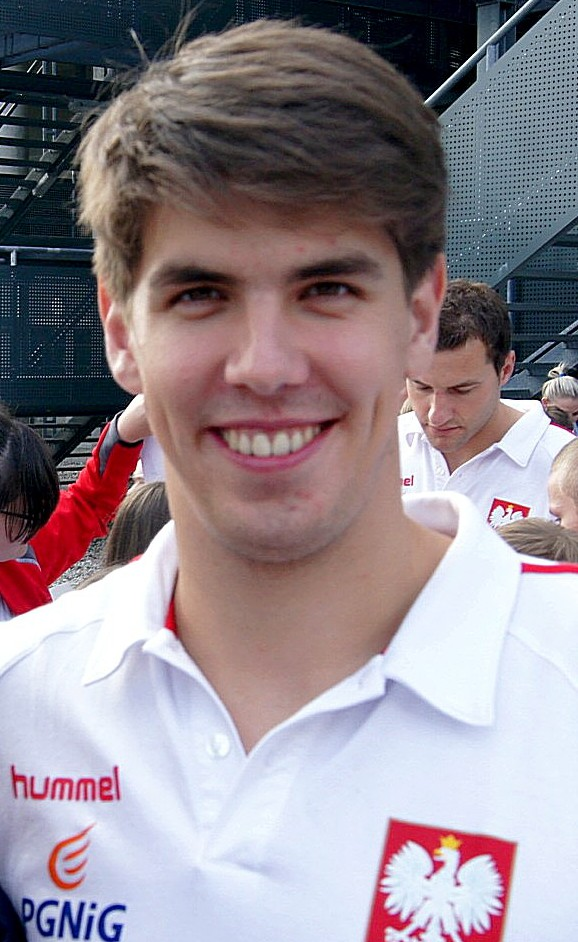

Personal information
- Nationality: Polish
- Born: 24 March 1988 (age 38) Kartuzy, Poland
- Height: 2.03 m (6 ft 8 in)

Sport
- Sport: Handball
- Position: Left back

Youth career
- Years: Team
- –2006: Cartusia Kartuzy

Senior clubs
- Years: Team
- 2006–2010: AZS-AWFiS Gdańsk
- 2010–2013: Wisła Płock
- 2013–2017: Vive Kielce
- 2017–2024: SC Magdeburg
National team
Years	Team	Apps	(Gls)
2010–2023	Poland	148	(178)
Medal record
World Championship
Bronze medal – third place	2015 Qatar
- Updated on 7 August 2024

Piotr Chrapkowski (born 24 March 1988) is a Polish retired handball player.

He is a bronze medalist of the 2015 World Championship.

== Personal life ==
Chrapkowski was born in Kartuzy, but grew up in Goręczyno. In December 2012 he married Dagmara Stawrosiejko. On 2 June 2015, their first daughter Sara was born. On 2 December 2016, his wife gave birth to their second daughter.

== Career ==
He debuted on the national team on 5 June 2010, in friendly match against Lithuania (31:31).

In May 2013 moved to Vive Targi Kielce. With team from Kielce, he achieved eight titles of the Polish Superliga.

On 1 February 2015, Poland, including Chrapkowski, won bronze medal of the 2015 World Championship. They won the bronze medal match (29:28) against Spain. He dedicated his bronze medal to his wife and unborn daughter.

== Achievements ==
Wisła Płock

- Polish Superliga: 2010–11

PGE Vive Kielce

- Polish Superliga: 2013–14, 2014–15, 2015–16, 2016–17
- Polish Cup: 2003, 2013, 2014, 2015, 2016, 2017
- EHF Champions League: 2015–16

SC Magdeburg

- EHF European League: 2021
- Handball-Bundesliga: 2022, 2024
- IHF Super Globe: 2021, 2022, 2023
- EHF Champions League: 2023
- DHB-Pokal: 2024

== State awards ==
- 2015 Silver Cross of Merit
