= Polish Post Office (Danzig) =

Post office in Danzig, Poland, 1920–1939

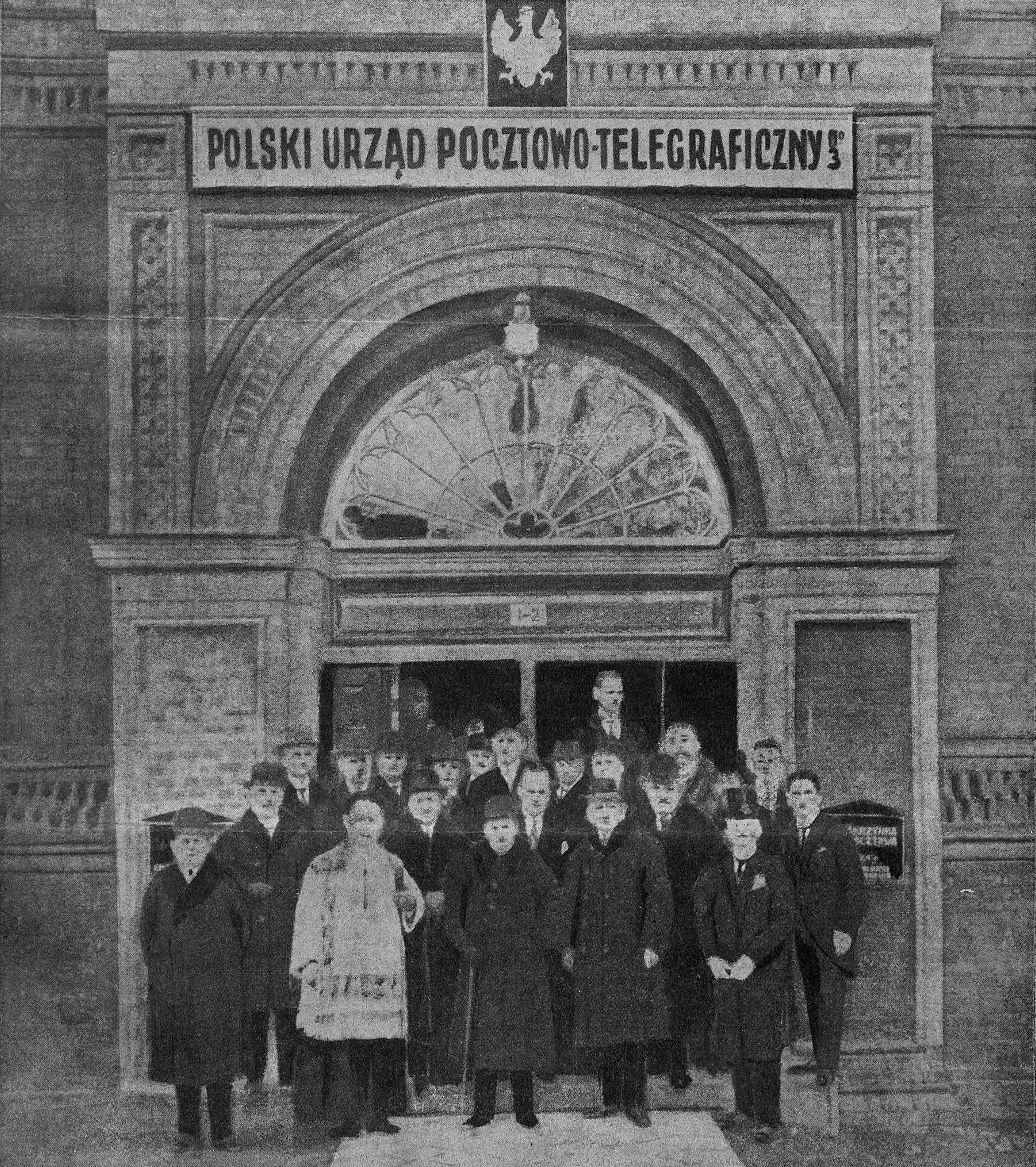
The opening of the Polish Post Office "Gdańsk 3" in 1925

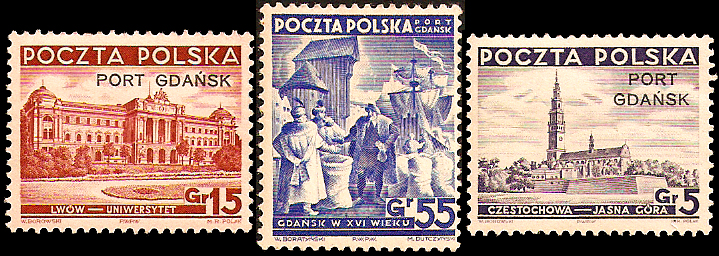
Post stamps of Polish Postal Service in the Free City of Danzig

The Polish Post Office (Poczta Polska) in the Free City of Danzig (modern day Gdańsk) was created in 1920 and operated until the German invasion of Poland that marked the beginning of World War II.

== History ==
The post office was established in Danzig under the provisions of the Treaty of Versailles, and its buildings were considered extraterritorial Polish property.

The Polish Post Office in Danzig comprised several buildings, originally built as a German military hospital. In 1930 the "Gdańsk 1" building on Hevelius Platz (square) in the Danziger Altstadt (Old Town) became the primary Polish post office, with a direct telephone line to Poland. In 1939 it employed slightly over 100 people. Some employees at the Polish Post Office belonged to a self-defence and security organization, and many were also members of the Polish Związek Strzelecki (Riflemen's Association). According to the testimony of Edmund Charaszkiewicz, the Polish Post Office was from 1935 an important component of the Polish Intelligence organization, "Group Zygmunt".

As tensions between Poland and Germany grew, in April 1939 the Polish High Command detached combat engineer and Army Reserve Sublieutenant (or 2LT) Konrad Guderski to the Baltic Sea coast. With Alfons Flisykowski and others, he helped organize the official and volunteer security staff at the Polish Post Office in Danzig, and prepare them for eventual hostilities. In addition to training the staff, he prepared the defenses in and around the building: nearby trees were removed and the entrance was fortified. In mid-August, ten additional employees were sent to the post office from Polish Post offices in Gdynia and Bydgoszcz (mostly reserve non-commissioned officers).

In the building of the Polish post on 1 September there were 57 people: Konrad Guderski, 42 local Polish employees, 10 employees from Gdynia and Bydgoszcz, and the caretaker with his wife and 10-year-old daughter who lived in the building. Polish employees had a cache of weapons, including three Browning wz.1928 light machine guns, 40 other firearms and three chests of hand grenades. The Polish defence plan assigned the defenders the role of keeping Germans from the building for 6 hours, when a relief force from Armia Pomorze was supposed to secure the area.

The German attack plan, devised in July 1939, stipulated that the building defenders would be stormed from two directions. A diversionary attack was to be carried out at the front entrance, while the main force would break through the wall from the neighbouring Work Office and attack from the side.

On September 1, 1939, Polish militiamen defended the building for some 15 hours against assaults by the SS Heimwehr Danzig (SS of the city Danzig), local SA formations, German Ordnungspolizei, and special units of Danzig police. All including four of the defenders who escaped from the building during the surrender were sentenced to death by a German court martial as illegal combatants on October 5, 1939, and executed by firing squad. For holding out for so long, inflicting higher than expected casualties and embarrassing the German SS unit and their commander, the director of the Danzig post office Jan Michoń was shot dead on site and postmaster Józef Wąsik was burned alive by a flamethrower as they tried to surrender.

In Poland, the whole episode has become one of the better known episodes of the Polish September Campaign and it is usually portrayed as a heroic story of David and Goliath proportions. In this view, it was a group of postmen who held out against German SS troops for almost an entire day.

== Present ==
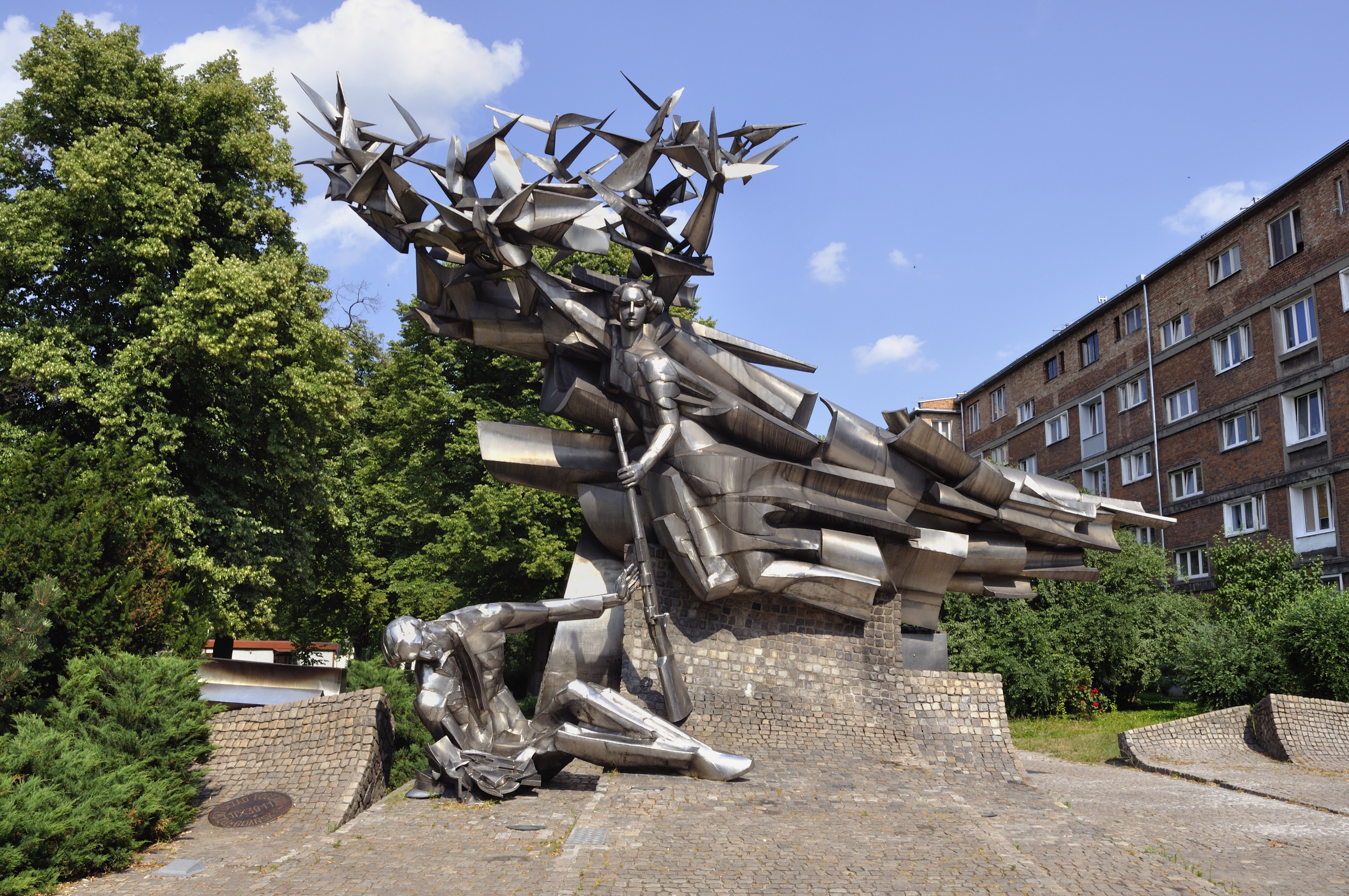
Monument to the Defenders of the Polish Post Office, Gdańsk

After World War II, Danzig was transferred to Poland. Currently, the building is the site of the Polish Post Office in Gdańsk and the Museum of the Polish Post Office in Gdańsk. In front of the Post Office there is the Monument of the Defenders of the Polish Post Office in Gdańsk (unveiled in 1979).

== See also ==
- Defence of the Polish Post Office in Danzig
- Postage stamps and postal history of Free City of Danzig
