= Free City of Danzig Police =

Law enforcement agency of Danzig from 1921 to 1939

- Pennant (1920-1939)

- Flag (1937-1939)

Agency overview
- Formed: 1920

Jurisdictional structure
- Operations jurisdiction: Free City of Danzig
- General nature: Civilian police

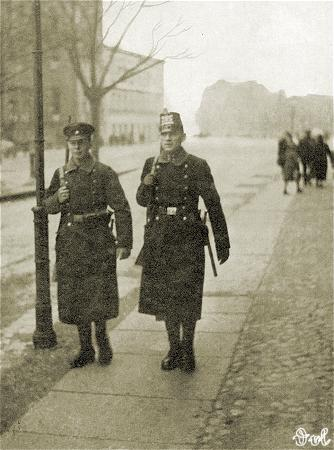
Danzig police officers in winter coats.

The Free City of Danzig Police (German: Polizei der Freien Stadt Danzig) or Schutzpolizei, as it was known locally, was a state constabulary and the official law enforcement agency within the Free City of Danzig, primarily from 1921 to 1939.

== Organization ==
=== General police ===
The League of Nations allowed for the Free City of Danzig to maintain a regular police force of several hundred men, which was bolstered by a poorly trained and ill-equipped citizens' militia with approximately 3,000 members. The constabulary reported to the Danzig Senate's Department of Internal Affairs. The police principally operated from 12 precincts, called Revier, and 7 registration points. Initially, they were organized as follows:

Revier	Location
I	Wiebenkaserne, Poggenpuhl (Żabi Kruk street)
II	Atstädtischer Graben 51/52 (Podwale Staromiejskie street)
III	Reiterkaserne, Wiedengasse 2 (Łąkowa street)
IV	Elisabethkirchengasse 1 (Elżbietańska street)
V	Ohra, An der Ostbahn 8 (Orunia, Zaułek street)
VI	Schidlitz, Kirchenweg 3 (Siedlce)
VII	Husarenkaserne, Langfuhr, Hauptstraße 71 (Wrzeszcz, Grunwaldzka street)
VIII	Heubude, Heidseestraße 37 (Stogi, Stryjewskiego street)
IX	St. Albrecht 45 (Św. Wojciech)
X	Oliva, Am Schloßgarten 24 (Oliwa, Opata Rybickiego street)
XI	Hindersinstraße 6 (Kasztanowa street)
XII	Zoppot, Schulstraße 23/25 (Sopot, Kościuszki street)

Registration point	Location
Langfuhr	Hauptstraße 144 (Wrzeszcz, Grunwaldzka street)
Krakau	Düneweg 27 (Krakowiec, Kępna street)
Troyl	Troyl 2 (Przeróbka, Przetoczna street)
Westl.-Neufähr	Alter Postweg 9 (Górki Zach., Lowicka street)
Weichselmünde	Mastenstraße 1 (Wisłoujscie, Parysa street)
Brösen	Kurstraße 1 (Brzeźno, Zdrojowa street)
Schellmühl	Broschkischerweg 19 (Młyniska, Wiślna street)

In 1926 the constabulary was reformed and the number of reviers was reduced to 9. They were as follows:

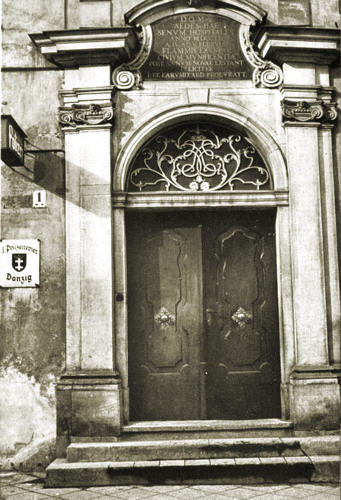
Revier I at Elisabethkirchengasse 1.

Revier	Location
I	Elisabethkirchengasse 1 (Elżbietańska street)
II	Atstädtischer Graben 51/52 (Podwale Staromiejskie street)
III	Weidengasse 2 (Łąkowa street)
IV	Fleischergasse (Rzeźnicka street)
V	Husarenkaserne, Langfuhr, Hauptstraße 71 (Wrzeszcz, Grunwaldzka street)
VI	Zoppot, Gerichtsstraße (Sopot, 3 Maja street)
VII	Neufahrwasser, Olivaer Straße 6/7 (Nowy Port, Oliwska street)
VIII	Langfuhr, Heeresanger 7 c-d (Wrzeszcz, Legionów ave.)
IX	Oliva, Am Schloßgarten 24 (Oliwa, Opata Rybickiego street)

=== Other branches ===
==== Railway police ====
The Polish Railway Administration employed members of the police to provide security for their railways. Paid for by the Polish government, the railway police were subject to both Danzig's general policing laws and the by–laws and direction of the railway administration.

==== Harbour police ====
A coast guard/harbour police section, called Küstenschutz der Danziger Polizei, was also maintained. It initially was a force of 120 individuals, which were managed by Danzig's Harbour Board. One section was to provide aid in navigation, while the other maintained safety and security. Arguments over the administration and authority of this branch led to much tension between the Free City's Senate and the Polish government. The Danzig Senate asserted it had the responsibility of upholding the law and could not surrender its executive powers to an external force. Poland argued its economic rights in the city could not be guaranteed if Danzig had the power to arbitrarily interfere with Polish shipping. In 1933 the Senate resolved to place the harbour under the direct protection of the regular police. Poland protested to the city's High Commissioner, but ultimately the League of Nations dismissed their complaint. In June 1934 Poland and Nazi Germany reached an agreement by which the Harbour Board would directly employ 12 Poles and 12 Danzigers to protect the port, under charge of the chief pilot. The Senate granted them the status of auxiliary police.

==== Air police ====
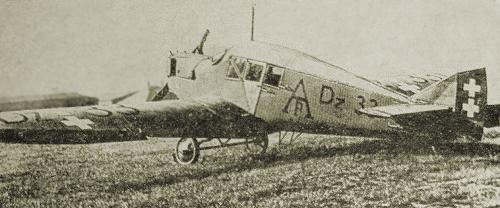
Junkers F13 with Free City markings

A police air squadron was established in November 1919 in Langfuhr with 25 members, including four pilots and two gunners. The squadron would ultimately field 20 different types of aircraft, including the Albatros C.XII and the Fokker D.VII. The squadron spent most of its time doing exercises and couriering. In May 1920 the implementation of the Treaty of Versailles outlawed the force. On 21 November the aircraft were requisitioned by Poland and the squadron was dissolved.

The squadron was replaced with the Fliegerzug der Verkehrshundertschaft der Schutzpolizei der Freien Stadt Danzig, also known as the Luftaufsicht. Most of the staff were carried over from the previous unit. In mid-1922, the force was renamed Luftfahrtüberwachungsstelle (L.Ü.St.). It was usually under the command of a police captain. In addition to the station in Langfuhr, the water airport in Plehnendorf (Rudniki) was used for auxiliary purposes.

== History ==
=== Establishment and early years ===
After the end of World War I Danzig was left without the administration of the German authorities. On 19 August 1919, the Sicherheitspolizei, or security police (called Sipo for short) was formed to protect the city's citizens and maintain order. Officers wore traditional dark blue uniforms with black shako caps.

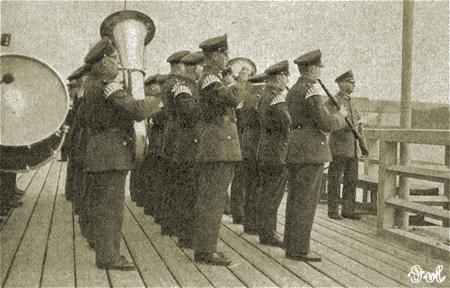
The Danzig "Musikkorps" police band.

On 9 April 1920, a military style marching band, the Musikkorps, was created. It was led by Obermusikmeister Ernst Stieberitz, a well-respected composer, and became prominent throughout the city and Europe.

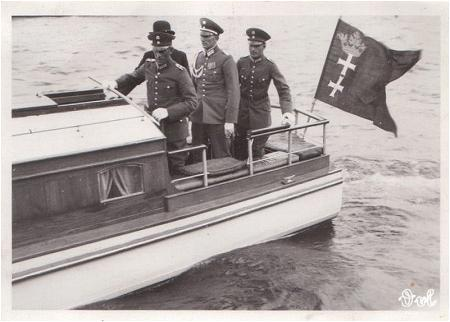
Danzig Police President Helmut Froböss.

In 1921, Danzig's government reformed the entire institution and established the Schutzpolizei, or protection police (Schupo for short). On 1 April, Helmut Froböss was chosen to be the President of the Police (German: Der Polizei-Präsident). He would serve in this post until late 1939.

In 1922 the police began introducing new gray-green caps and uniforms. The caps were now adorned with a coat of arms inscribed with the city's motto, "Nec Temere, Nec Timide". By 1 December 1924, they had completely replaced the traditional attire.

=== Nazism, political repression, and conflict with Poland ===
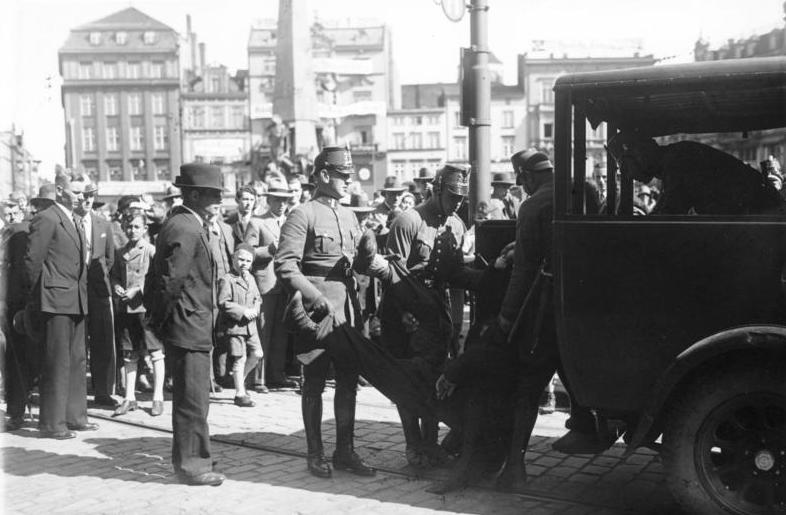
Danzig police arrest a protester in the aftermath of the 1933 Parliamentary Elections.

Flag for the last years of the Free City Police.

After the Nazi takeover of the Senate in 1933, the police were increasingly used to suppress free speech and political dissent. The constabulary itself was also directly affected. On 31 October 1933, in a speech made to the Police Administration Professional Union, according to the newspaper Danziger Neueste Nachrichten, the vice-president of the Danzig Senate said,

A police official who did not definitely accept the National-Socialist State would never hold a position under him. If the totalitarianism claimed by the National-Socialist Party were not achieved, he, too, would be unable to achieve his object. Firm action would have to be taken to make the new regime a reality There could no longer be any room in Danzig for parties or for members of the Socialist, Centre or German-National groups. He could promise that all parties would disappear. He would keep a firm grip on the police and make it an instrument of the National-Socialist State. On the other hand, the police were bound to take up their stand against all enemies of the National-Socialist State. Supporters of the Centre Party were no longer wanted in the Civil Service, since they were enemies of the State. The police corps had such a National-Socialist training and was so imbued with National-Socialist convictions that it provided a guarantee for the National-Socialist State. Accordingly political professional organisations would, in future, find no place in the uniformed police. The humblest police official must realize that National Socialism was the only idea of the State which could subsist in future. Hence, the leaders of political factions had had their day... He was ready to agree, however, that purely economic organisations should be allowed to remain in existence.

— Arthur Greiser, Vice-President of the Senate,

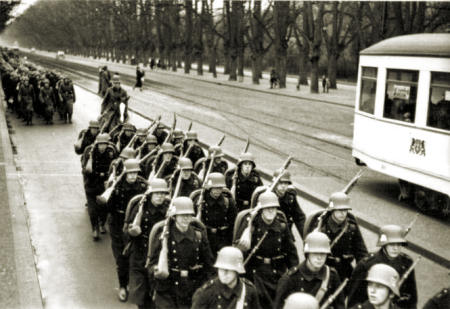
Danzig Schutzpolizei.

This was in conjunction with a subsequent dissolution and ban on professional unions within the state constabulary. The speech and the ban were the subject of much criticism in the 2 November editions of the oppositional newspapers Danziger Landeszeitung and Danziger Volksstimme, which accused the Senate of violating public officials' constitutional rights. The following day Police President Froböss, citing Article II, section 5, of the Legal Ordinance concerning Measures for ensuring Public Safety and Order of June 30th, 1933, ordered them to suspend publications for 8 days and 2 months respectively. The papers' editors appealed to the League of Nations High Commissioner of Danzig, Helmer Rosting, to step in. The Volksstimme also petitioned the Senate to withdraw the ban, who rejected it. On 5 November, Froböss, citing a possible danger to the state, took the editor-in-chief of the Landeszeitung and an editor from the Volksstimme into "protective custody," predicting their papers would continue to criticize the decisions of the government. After investigating the matter himself, Commissioner Rosting forwarded the appeals to the Secretary General of the League of Nations, where they were ultimately dismissed.

In 1935, the police begin wearing caps with Totenkopf.

On 20 June 1938, an awards system for length of service in the force is established. Silver medals, silver crosses, and gold crosses are awarded for 8, 18, and 25 years of service respectively.

On 20 July 1939, a customs officer shot and killed a Polish soldier along the border. Danzig authorities maintained that the officer had fired in self-defense, while Polish officials asserted that the soldier had been in Polish territory at the time. The shooting coincided with the sentencing of a Polish public official to 14 months in prison in Danzig and the arrest of a Polish army officer in the city, further straining relations.

==== Treatment of Jews ====
In spite of the Nazi influence, the police kept relatively cordial relations with the local Jewish population. Officials often cooperated with Jewish leaders for fear that excessive oppression would result in a Polish intervention. The police also assisted the Jews in protecting the Great Synagogue from arson attacks on 12 and 13 November 1938. In 1939, the police granted a permit for the transfer of historical artifacts from the city to the Jewish Theological Seminary of America in the United States. They helped to facilitate emigration from the Free City to Poland as a peaceful and orderly means of getting rid of the Jews.

=== Polish-German tensions and the Invasion of Poland ===
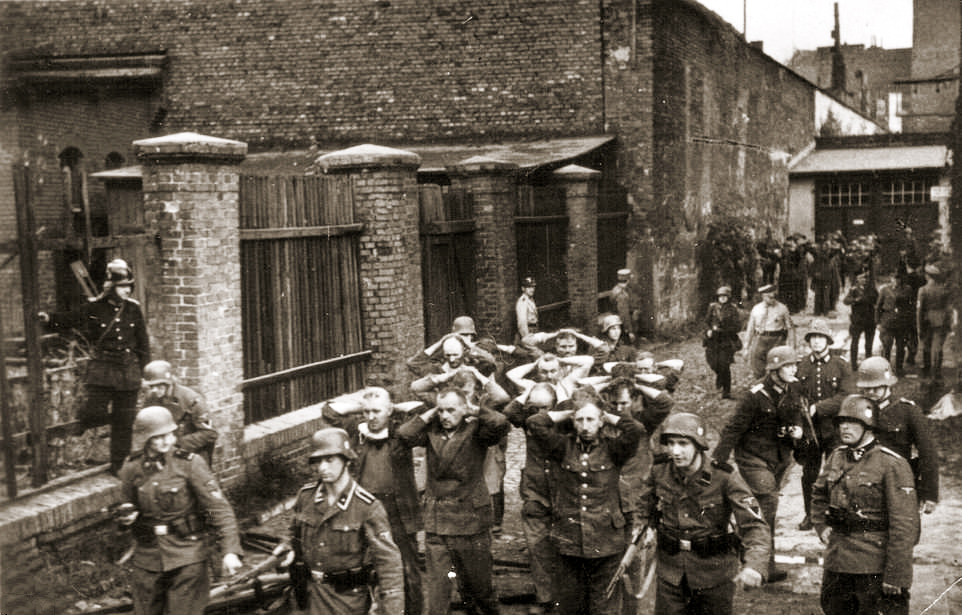
Polish postal workers are led away by the SS. A Danzig Police officer is standing on the far left.

By 1939, Polish-German relations had broken down and war seemed a likely possibility. Danzig security authorities began drawing up plans to seize Polish installations throughout the city, in the event of a German offensive into the Polish Corridor. They assisted the Germans in organizing military forces within the city throughout August 1939.

On 1 September, the German pre-dreadnought Schleswig-Holstein began shelling the Polish garrison at Westerplatte. Shortly thereafter Danzig police, under the command of Polezeioberst Willi Bethke, launched an attack on the city's Polish Post Office. The coast guard unit of the police assisted the Germans at Westerplatte.

=== After the invasion of Poland ===
The Danzig police was taken over by the Gestapo after the invasion. Helmut Froböss left his job and became president of the provincial German high court. Stutthof, 22 miles east of the city, was run by the new President of Police as an internment camp from 1939, until it was handed over to the Germans as a political prisoner camp in November 1941. Bombing by the Soviets in 1945 killed Obermusikmeister Ernst Stieberitz. All vestiges of the Danzig Police were eliminated when the Red Army captured the city on 28 March 1945.

== See also ==
- SG OrPo Danzig
