= Coat of arms of Gdańsk =

Polish coat of arms

Versions
- Grand coat of arms
- Armiger: City of Gdańsk (lesser coat of arms); Aleksandra Dulkiewicz, City mayor of Gdańsk (greater coat of arms)
- Earliest mention: 1410
- Adopted: 2010
- Motto: Nec temere, nec timide
- Constituent parts: Two silver crosses and a golden crown on a red shield

The coat of arms of the city of Gdańsk (Polish: herb Gdańska, German: Wappen Danzigs), in its current form, dates back to 1410 and Banderia Prutenorum. The coat of arms is very similar to the flag of Gdańsk. It depicts two silver crosses on a red shield above each other, above which hovers a golden crown. The greater arms also has two lions as supporters and Gdańsk motto.

The coat of arms in its current form (two crosses and a crown) was given by Casimir IV Jagiellon on May 25, 1457. Officially adopted in 2010.

== History ==
Coat of arms of Gdańsk was also used by several noble families of Russia, including Counts Sheremetevs, Lodygins, and Konovnitsyns. In case of the Sheremetev and Konovnitsyn coat of arms, it refers to the legendary origin of the family from the leader of one of the Prussian tribes. A similar design is used by Oliwa.

Republic of Danzig used same symbols. Between the world wars, the Free City of Danzig adopted its arms, defined in the Constitution (Die Verfassung der Freien Stadt Danzig vom 17. November 1920). Both pattée (tatzenkreuz) and common crosses (gemeines Kreuz) were used.

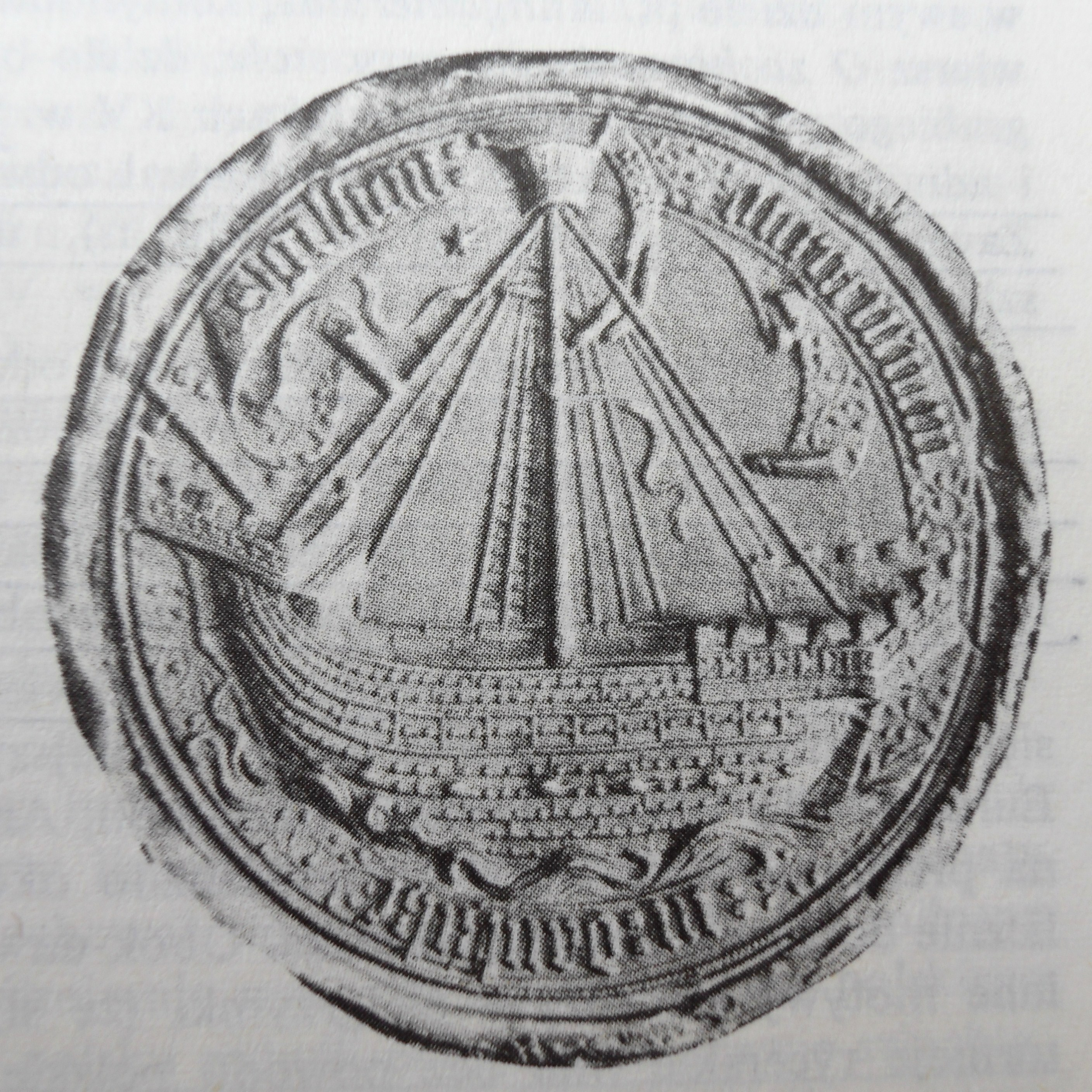
15th Century seal

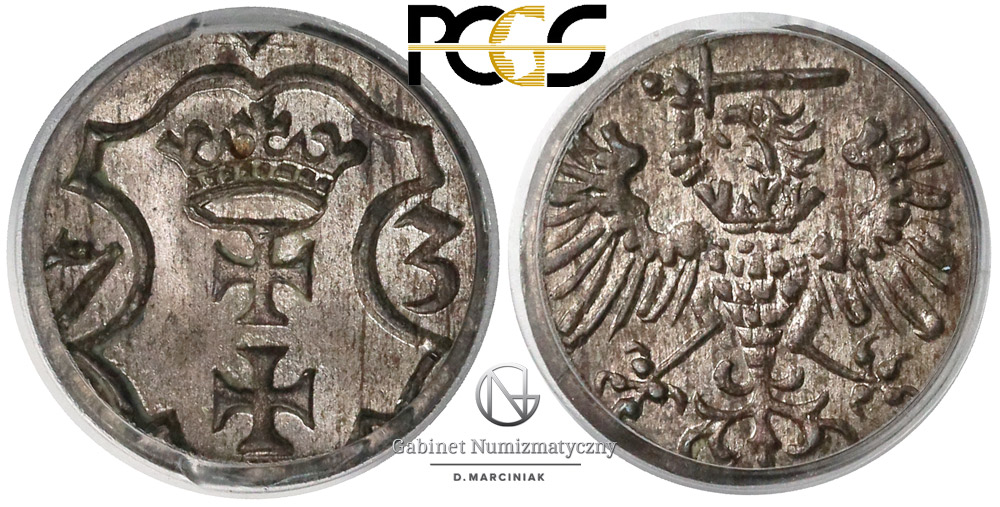
A Danzig denar coin minted in Gdańsk (Danzig) in 1573

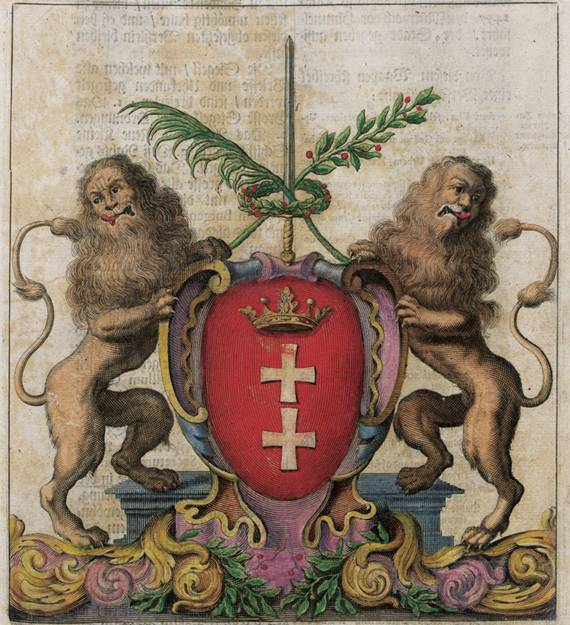
The coat of arms of Danzig as of the 17th century

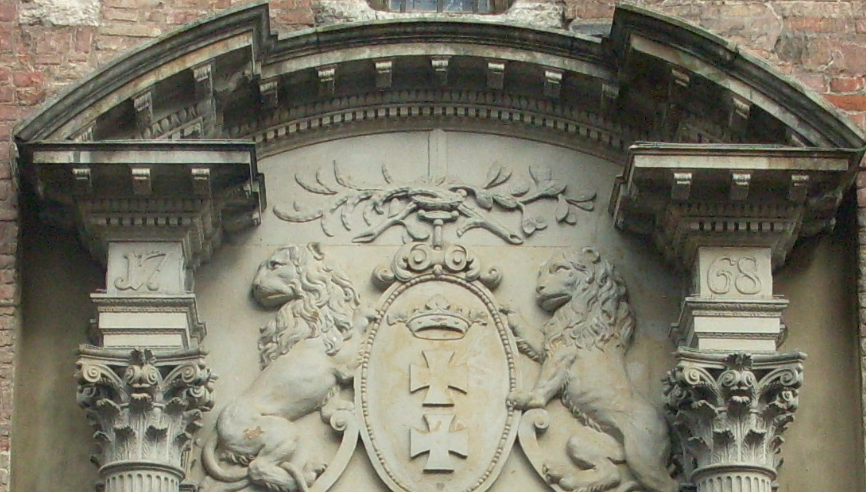
Front door and portal of Gdańsk Town Hall. The heads of the lions are turned towards the Golden Gate, according to legend, they look for help from the Polish king.

Early Coat of Arms of the Republic of Danzig c 1808

Lesser Coat of Arms of the Republic of Danzig c 1808

Late Coat of Arms of the Republic of Danzig c 1812

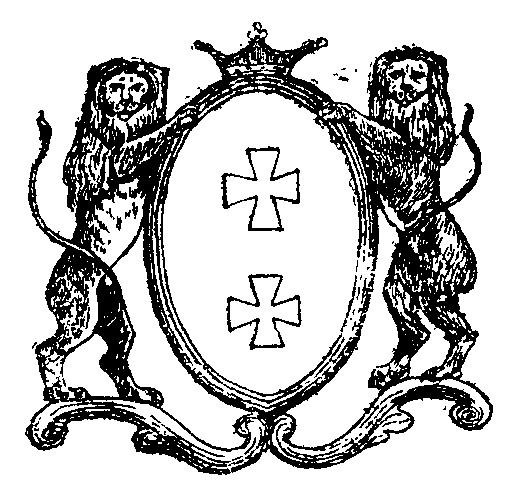
Coat of arms of Gdańsk. Depiction from 1840s

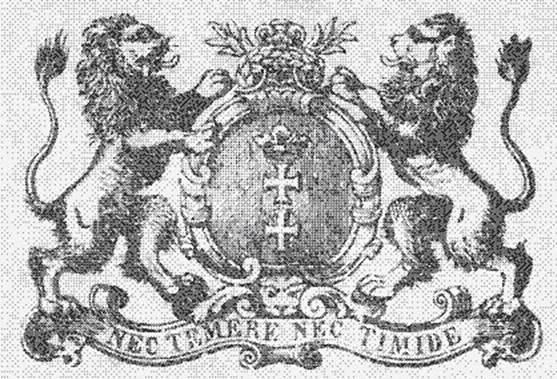
Coat of Arms of Danzig in Prussia 1893

Coat of Arms of the Free City

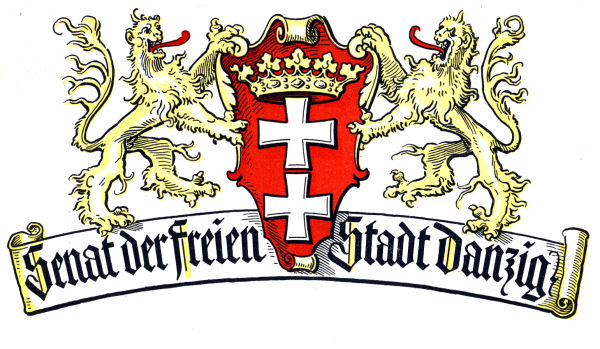
Coat of Arms of the Senate of the Free City of Danzig

Seal of the Senate of the Free City of Danzig

No. 318 Polish Fighter-Reconnaissance Squadron

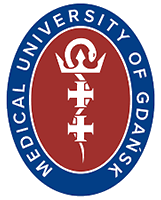
Medical University of Gdańsk

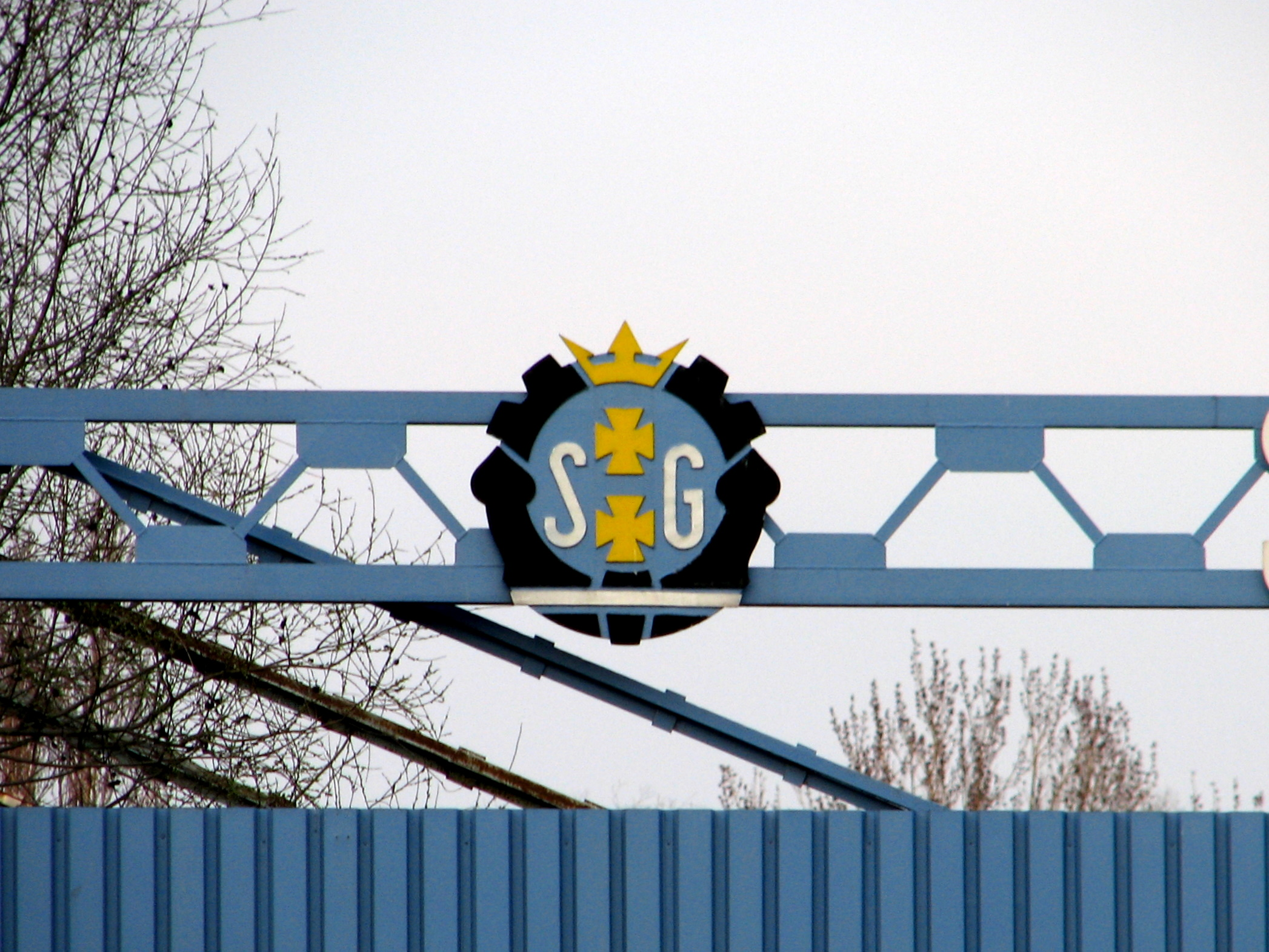
Gdańsk Shipyard

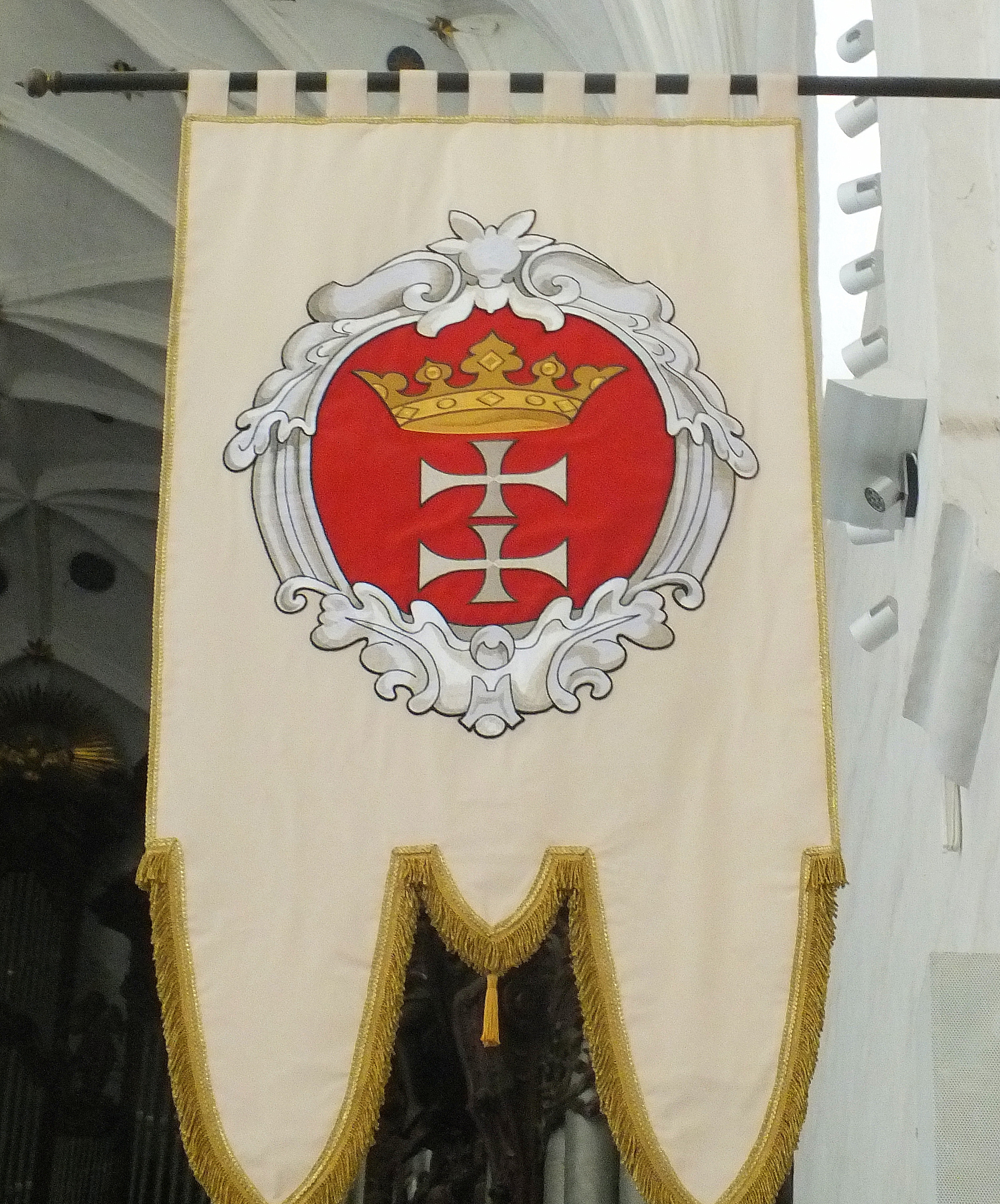
Oliwa Cathedral

== See also ==
- Danzig Cross

== Sources ==
- Banderia Prutenorum oder die Fahnen des Deutschen Ordens und seiner Verbündeten, welche in Schlachten und Gefechten des 15. Jahrhunderts eine Beute der Polen wurden / Abb. F.A. Vossberg. — Berlin, 1849.
