= Danzig denar =

Currency used in Danzig in 16th century

Denar gdański (Polish)
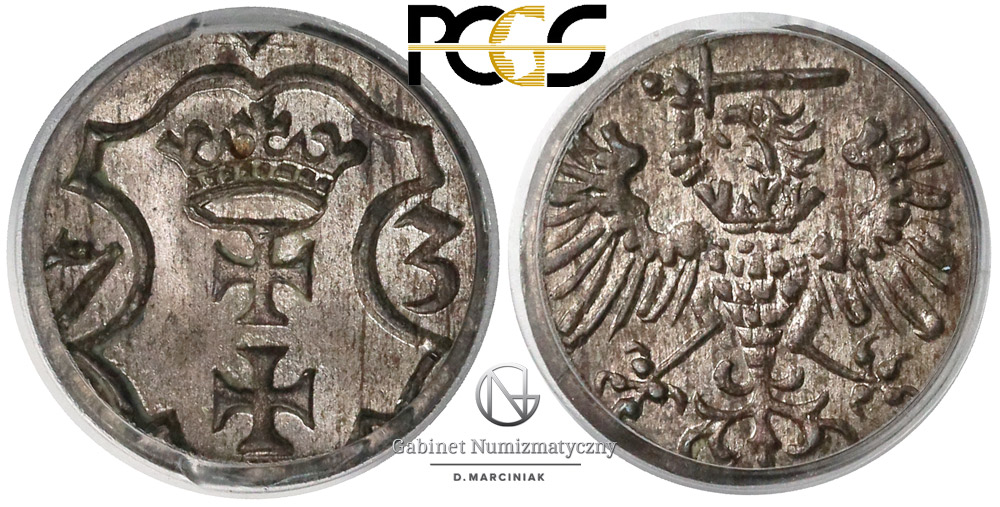
- Obverse and reverse of a Danzig denar coin

Demographics
- Date of introduction: 1539
- This infobox shows the latest status before this currency was rendered obsolete.

The Danzig denar was a currency used in the city of Danzig (currently Gdańsk) issued at various times in the 16th century, including, most notably, in 1573, during the reign of Henry of Valois as King of the Polish–Lithuanian Commonwealth. In works published starting in the late 20th century, it is considered to be among the coins of the interregnum of 1572–1573.

In 1573, the second year of the first interregnum of the Commonwealth, Danzig minted two variants of the coin, the denarius (denar) and shilling (szeląg). These were the first coins minted in Danzig since the closure of the local mint in 1558.

== Characteristics (1573) ==
The obverse of the coin featured the coat of arms of the city between the numbers 7 and 3 (meant to be an abbreviation of the year 1573). The Prussian coat of arms was found on the reverse. The coin had a diameter of 12 millimetres (0.47 in). It was made out of 1.5 lots of silver, equivalent to 0.37 grams (0.013 oz).

== Minting history ==
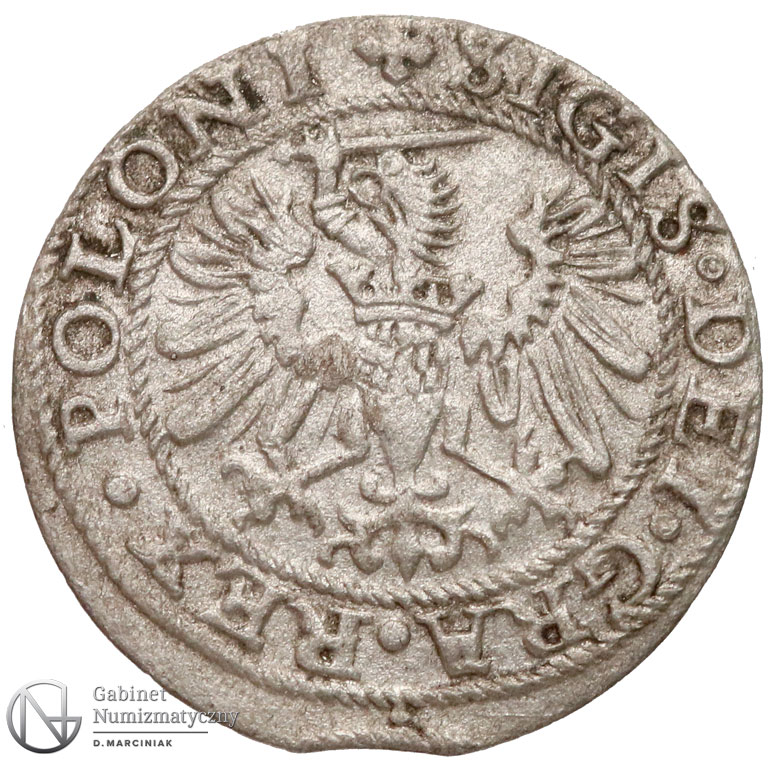
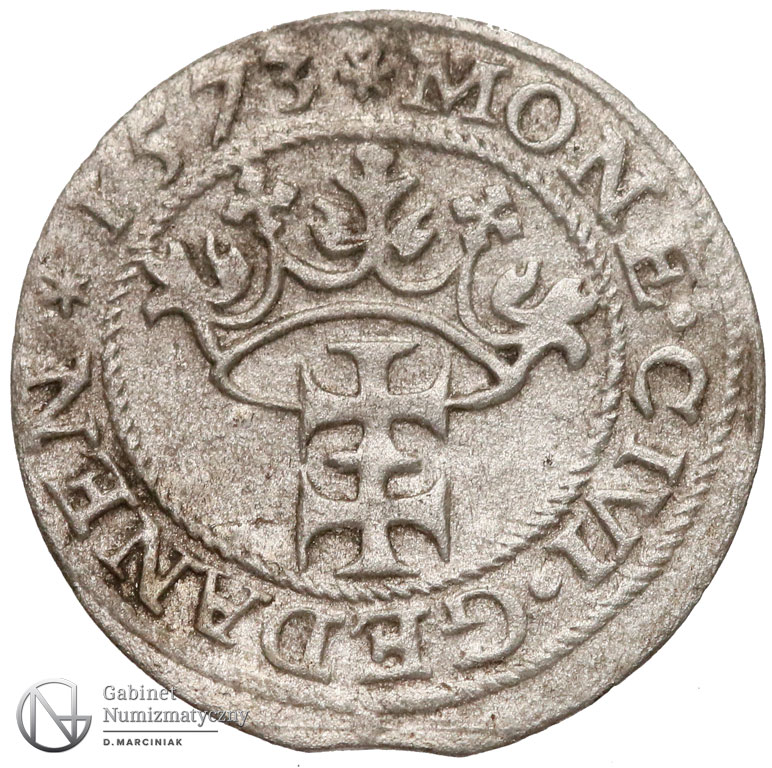
Abverse (right) and reverse (left) of the shilling (szeląg)

The denar was minted during the reigns of various kings both before and after 1573, those being:

1. Sigismund I the Old (1539 and 1546–1548)
2. Sigismund II Augustus (1549–1558)
3. Stephen Báthory
4. Sigismund III Vasa (1590–1599)

The 1573 edition was distinct from previous editions, as it featured the outline of the coat of arms on the obverse, whereas only the coat of arms without an outline was featured on coins from previous years. Unlike on other denar coins, which did not feature the king's titles, the 1573 shilling featured the text SIGIS DEI GRA REX POLONI, identical to text used on the shillings minted during Sigismund I's reign, and not to that on Sigismund II's, which was SIGIS AVG REX POLO M D LI.

== Bibliography ==
Stężyński Bandtkie, Kazimierz Władysław (1839). Numismatyka krajowa t. 1. J.Glücksberg, Księgarz Szkół Publicznych w Królestwie Polskiem.
Kurpiewski, Janusz (1994). Katalog monet polskich 1506–1573. Warsaw: Polskie Towarzystwo Numizmatyczne, Zarząd Główny. ISBN 83-85057-24-2.
Paszkiewicz, Borys (2012). Podobna jest moneta nasza do urodnej panny. Mała historia pieniądza polskiego. Warsaw: Warszawskie Centrum Numizmatyczne. ISBN 978-83-62939-00-8.
Kopicki, Edmund (1995). Ilustrowany skorowidz pieniędzy polskich. Warsaw: Polskie Towarzystwo Numizmatyczne.
Gumowski, Marian (1990). Mennica gdańska. Gdańsk: Polskie Towarzystwo Archeologiczne i Numizmatyczne, Oddział w Gdańsku.
