= Goręczyno =

- Village
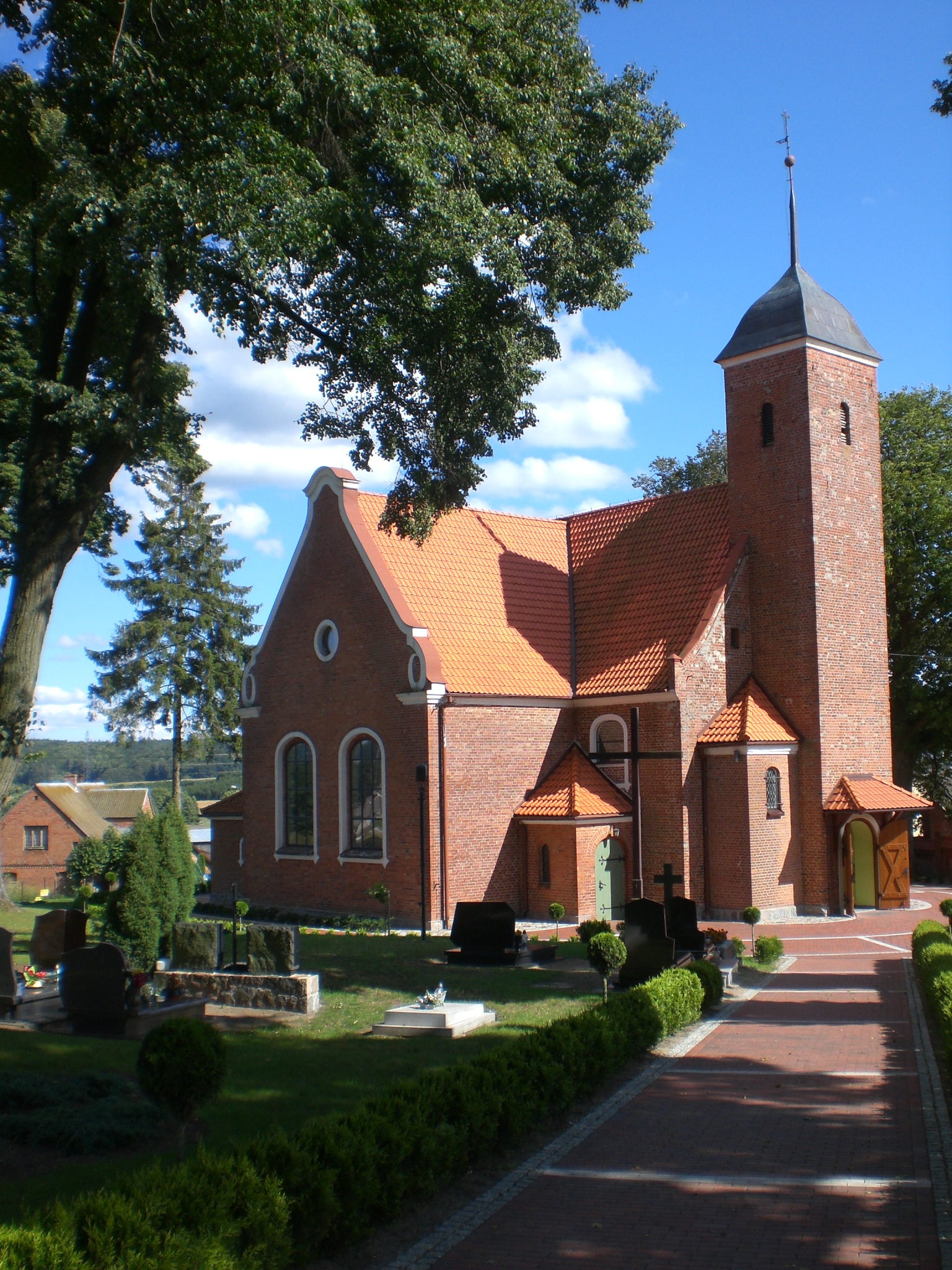
- Church of Holy Trinity and All Saints

- Location within Poland
- Coordinates: 54°15′56″N 18°9′45″E
- Country: Poland
- Voivodeship: Pomeranian
- County: Kartuzy
- Gmina: Somonino

Population
  - Total: 1,300
- Time zone: UTC+1 (CET)
  - Summer (DST): UTC+2 (CEST)
- Vehicle registration: GKA

Goręczyno [ɡɔrɛnˈt͡ʂɨnɔ] (Kashubian: Gòrãczëno) is a village in the administrative district of Gmina Somonino, within Kartuzy County, Pomeranian Voivodeship, in northern Poland. It is located in the ethnocultural region of Kashubia in the historic region of Pomerania.

== History ==
During the German occupation of Poland (World War II), the local forest was the site of a massacre of Poles committed by the Germans on October 29, 1939, as part of the Intelligenzaktion. Poles from Goręczyno were also among the victims of massacres of Poles, committed by the Germans in nearby Kaliska in October and November 1939, while local priest Wacław Kuc was murdered during a massacre of Polish priests from the region perpetrated by the Einsatzkommando 16 in the forest near Kartuzy. In 1941, the occupiers also carried out expulsions of Poles, whose houses were then handed over to German colonists as part of the Lebensraum policy.

== Sports ==
The local football club is Gryf Goręczyno. It competes in the lower leagues.

== Notable people ==
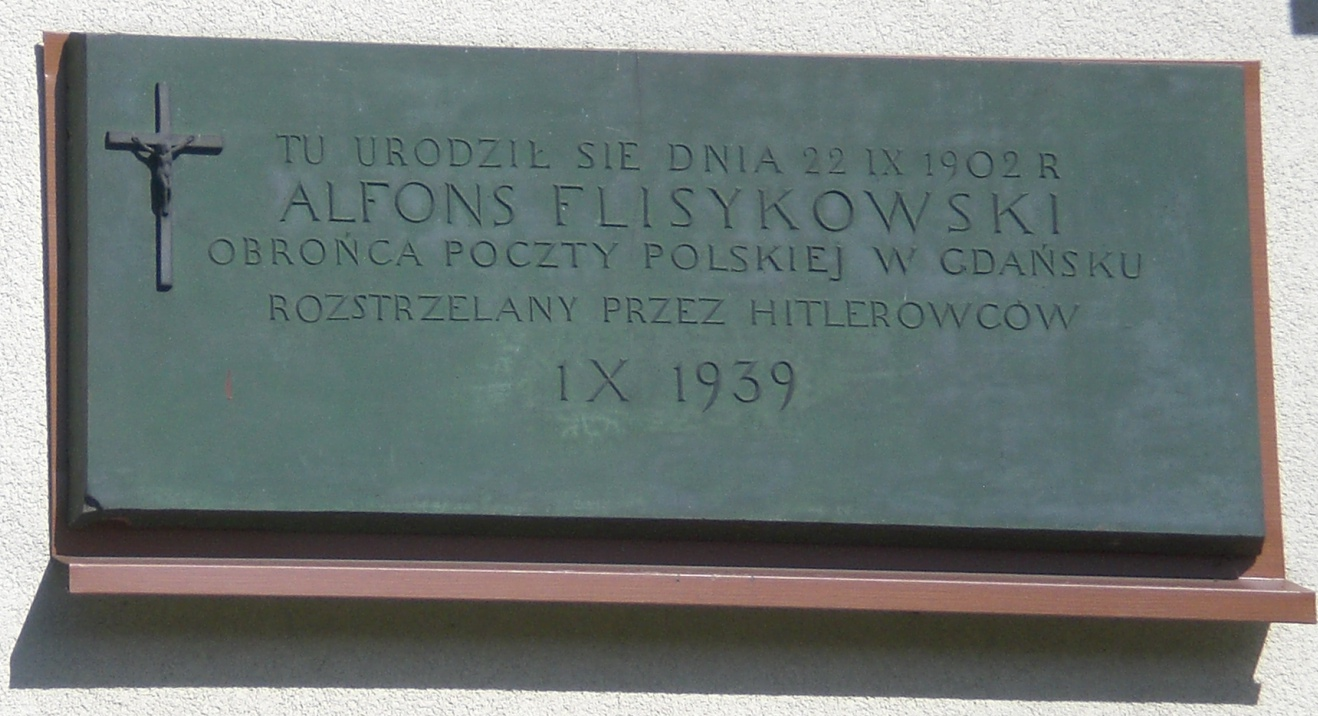
Memorial plaque at the birthplace of Alfons Flisykowski

- Alfons Flisykowski (1902–1939), Polish postal worker, second commander of the Defence of the Polish Post Office in Gdańsk during the German invasion of Poland
