= ADGZ =

Steyr ADGZ
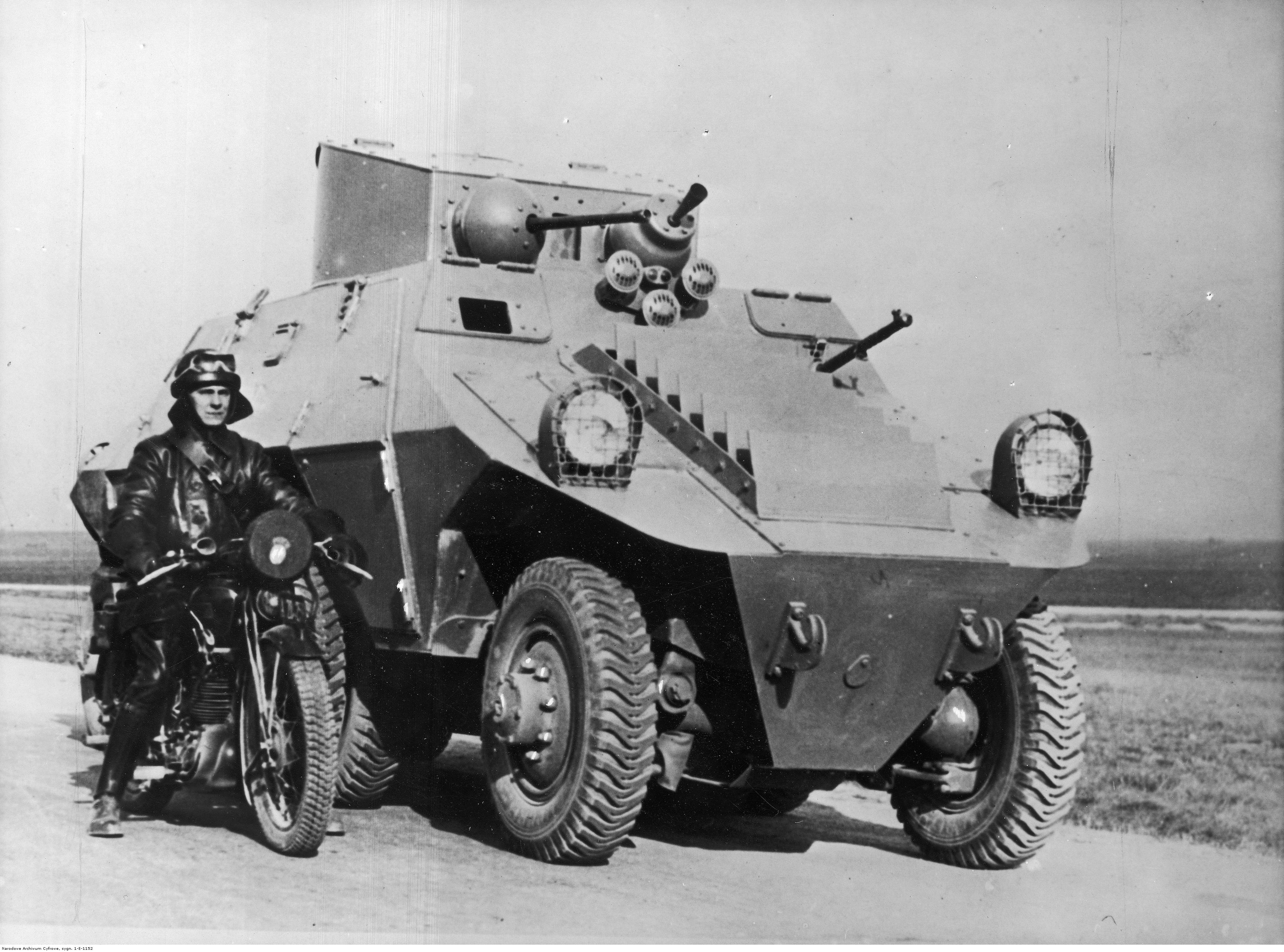
- ADGZ in 1936
- Type: Armored car
- Place of origin: Austria

Service history
- Used by: Austria; Nazi Germany; Free City of Danzig; Independent State of Croatia
- Wars: World War II

Production history
- Designer: Steyr
- Designed: 1934-1935
- Manufacturer: Steyr
- Produced: 1935-1941
- No. built: 52

Specifications
- Mass: 12 tons
- Length: 6.26 m (20 ft 6 in)
- Width: 2.16 m (7 ft 1 in)
- Height: 2.56 m (8 ft 5 in)
- Crew: 6
- Armor: 11 mm (0.43 in)
- Main armament: 20mm KwK 35 L/45 (with 100 rounds); 45 mm wz. 1932 (19-K) (T-26 model 1933 turret)
- Secondary armament: 2 x 7.92mm MG34 (Hull); 1 x 7.92mm MG34 or 1 x DT machine gun (Turret)
- Engine: Austro-Daimler M612, 6-cylinder, 12 litre 150 hp (110 kW)
- Suspension: wheel 8×4
- Operational range: 450 km (280 mi)
- Maximum speed: 70 km/h (43 mph)

The Steyr ADGZ was an Austrian heavy armored car used during World War II. It was originally designed for the Austrian Army (designated as the "M35 Mittlerer Panzerwagen") in 1934, and delivered in 1935–1937.

== History ==
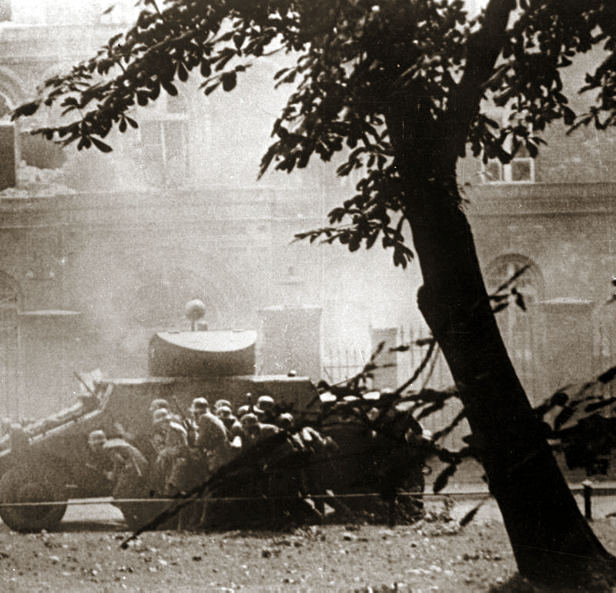
An ADGZ covers SS troops during an attack on the Polish Post Office in Danzig, 1 September 1939.

The ADGZ had 12 wheels, 4 axles, four headlights (two on each end), 6mm thick armor on the front, rear, and sides, and a dual transmission which allowed for the car to be driven from either end. The circular central turret housed a 20mm KwK 35 L/45 autocannon. Both sides were fitted with two half-doors where the top and bottom portions could be opened independently, as well as a ball mount on each side for an MG 34 machine gun.

The Austrian army was using the ADGZ armored car at the time of the Anschluss, with 12 being used by the army and 14 by police. The Germans also employed the vehicles for police work, with some taken by the Waffen-SS.

The SS ordered 25 more vehicles for use in the Balkans for anti-partisan activity and other police purposes. An unconfirmed source stated that tests were performed with T-26 turrets after several were captured by the Russians in 1941. As part of the initial operations of the Invasion of Poland, the SS Heimwehr Danzig used three ADGZ armored cars during the attack on the Polish Post Office in Danzig, but one was lost during the battle. Some ADGZs were also supplied to the Army of the Independent State of Croatia. The ADGZ was also used on the Eastern Front, and supposedly some were fitted with captured Soviet T-26 tank turrets armed with 20-K 45mm guns.
