= Alfons Flisykowski =

Polish murder victim

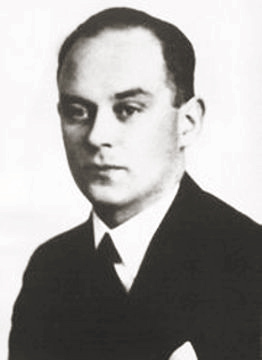
- Born: Alfons Flisykowski; 22 September 1902; Goręczyno, Kartuzy County, Prussian Partition
- Died: 5 October 1939 (aged 37); Danzig-Saspe
- Cause of death: Execution by firing squad
- Occupations: Worker of the Polish Post Office, Second commander of the defence of the Post Office

Alfons Flisykowski (22 September 1902 – 5 October 1939) was a Polish worker of the Polish Post Office in the Free City of Danzig in the years 1923–1939 and a second commander (after Konrad Guderski) of the defence of the Post Office from the invading Nazi German forces when World War II started on 1 September 1939.

== Background ==
Flisykowski was captured by the Germans on 2 September 1939 and handed over to the Gestapo. Denied the legitimate status of POW, he was put on trial (which was later found to be illegal), together with the other 37 captured post-office workers. Designated as a "bandit" by a paramilitary court (and therefore not protected by the Geneva Convention), he was sentenced to death and executed by firing squad in Danzig-Saspe on 5 October 1939.

Flisykowski's grave was discovered in 1991. In the same year the families of the killed postmen founded an association called Circle of the Families of the Former Workers of Gdańsk Post Office (Koło Rodzin Byłych Pracowników Poczty Gdańskiej) with a goal to repeal the verdict qualifying the postmen as bandits. With the help of Dieter Schenk, a former worker of Interpol and the author of a book on the subject, the case was put into a verification trial.

As a result of these actions the Land Court in Lübeck made a decision, on 30 December 1996, that the previous verdict of 1939 sentencing Flisykowski to death was illegal.

He was awarded the Cross of Valour posthumously on 1 September 1990.
