= Danzig Cross =

Award of the Danzig Nazi Party

Danzig Cross Danziger Kreuz
- Ribbon: Danzig Cross, second class
- Type: Merit award
- Awarded for: Building up the Nazi Party in Danzig
- Description: Two class decoration
- Presented by: German Danzig
- Eligibility: Nazi Party members
- Established: 31 August 1939
- First award: 24 October 1939

Highlights
- Total: 88 first class 253 second class
- Danzig city arms that appear on the award

The Danzig Cross (German: Danziger Kreuz) was a Nazi decoration of the Free City of Danzig. The Cross was instituted on 31 August 1939 as a two grade decoration by Danzig Gauleiter Albert Forster. It was awarded to those, both in Danzig and in the wider Reich, who contributed to building up the Nazi Party in the Free City prior to its incorporation into Germany on 1 September 1939.

By December 1939, 88 first class and 253 second class crosses had been awarded, most of them in a ceremony on 24 October 1939. Hans Frank was a recipient of the award on 19 May 1940.

== Design ==
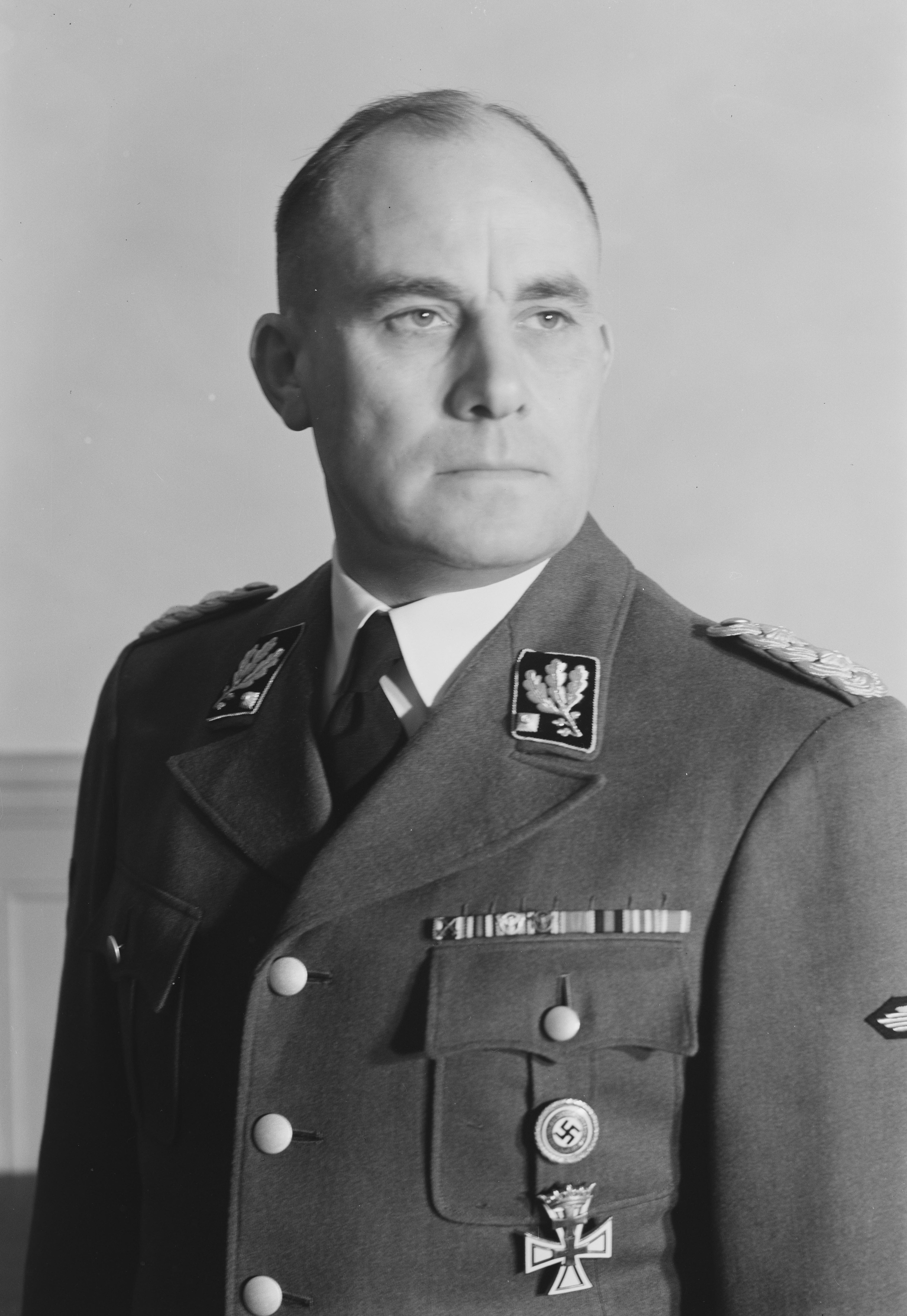
The SS and Police Leader in German-occupied Norway Wilhelm Rediess with Danzig Cross and Golden Party Badge on his SS-Obergruppenführer uniform 1941.

The Danzig Cross was designed by Benno von Arent. The cross, with elongated upper and lower arms, is in white enamel with gilt outlines. Its upper arm and centre bear the coronet and twin cross of the Danzig coat of arms, also in gilt. The reverse is plain with a Huelse Berlin maker's mark. The second class, 43mm in height and 31mm wide, is attached to a red ribbon with yellow and white strips on its edges. The first class cross, slightly larger at 60mm by 44mm, is convex and has a pin on the reverse for wear on the left side of the jacket.

As an award of the National Socialist government of Danzig, the Cross was recognised as an official decoration of a German state, and could therefore be worn in both Nazi Party and Wehrmacht uniform. All Nazi era decorations were banned after Germany's defeat in 1945, and the Danzig Cross was not among those re-authorised for wear by the Federal Republic of Germany in 1957.

== See also ==
- Political decorations of the Nazi Party
