= Postage stamps and postal history of the Free City of Danzig =

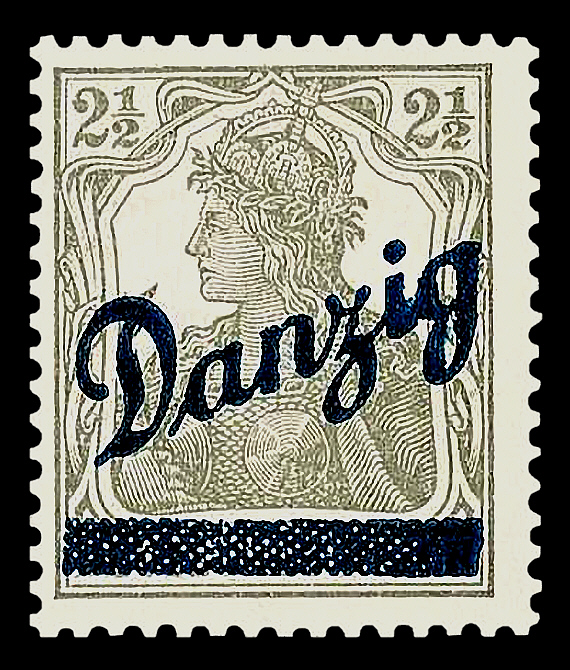
A 1920 Germany stamp overprinted for use in Danzig

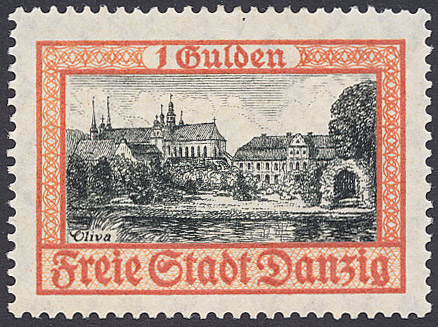
A 1938 stamp of Danzig

This is an overview of the postage stamps and postal history of the Free City of Danzig.

Danzig, now Gdańsk, is a Polish city on the Baltic coast. It was the Free City of Danzig with its own stamps from 1920 until 1939.

== First stamps ==
The first stamps of Danzig were overprinted German stamps issued on 14 June 1920. The first stamps of the Danzig Free State appeared in January 1921 and continued in use until the outbreak of World War II in 1939. At that time the Free City was annexed by Nazi Germany.

== Polish post office ==
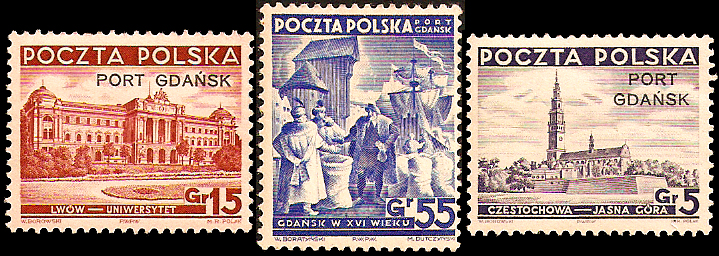
Post stamps of Polish Postal Service in the Free City of Danzig

A Polish Post Office operated in the harbour of Danzig (see Polish Post Office in Danzig). This used Polish stamps overprinted PORT GDANSK.

== See also ==
- Postage stamps and postal history of Germany
- Postage stamps and postal history of Poland
