= SS Heimwehr Danzig =

Nazi military unit

Flag of the SS Heimwehr Danzig

SS Heimwehr "Danzig" was an SS unit established in the Free City of Danzig (today Gdańsk and environs, Poland) before the Second World War. It fought with the German Army against the Polish Army during the invasion of Poland. After this it became part of the 3rd SS Totenkopf Division and ceased to exist as an independent unit.

Also known as Heimwehr Danzig (Danzig Home Defense), it was officially established on 20 June 1939, when the Danzig senate under Albert Forster decided to set up its own armed force; a cadre of this new unit primarily formed the Danzig SS Wachsturmbann "Eimann".

== History ==
Reichsführer-SS Heinrich Himmler supported this project and sent SS-Obersturmbannführer Hans Friedemann Götze to Danzig. Goetze was the commander of the III. Sturmbann (Battalion) of the 4th SS-Totenkopfstandarte "Ostmark", established in October 1938 in Berlin-Adlersheim.

The III. Sturmbann was strengthened with the help of anti-tank defense forces (the Panzerabwehr-Lehrsturm of the SS- Totenkopfstandarten) as well as about 500 additional volunteers from Danzig who named their new unit SS Sturmbann "Goetze". It was formed to conduct police actions in and around Danzig. The Danzig SS-men had been members a special SS troop established in July 1939 - the Wachsturmbann "Eimann" - and at the beginning of August this self-named Sturmbann "Goetze" reached the peninsula at the mouth of the Vistula called the Danzig Westerplatte. There it hid on German ships, including the naval training ship Schleswig-Holstein.

The Volksdeutsche (ethnic Germans) in Danzig founded the 1,550-man strong Heimwehr Danzig.

On 1 September 1939, German troops attacked Poland. The Heimwehr Danzig took part in the capture of the Polish post office after fifteen hours; an event which Günter Grass dedicated a chapter of his novel The Tin Drum to. During the attacks, the German forces used ADGZ armoured cars, 75mm and 105mm artillery and flamethrowers against Polish employees and defenders within the Post Office armed with pistols, rifles, light machine guns and grenades. The SS-Heimwehr Danzig also participated in the attack on the Danzig Westerplatte, Polish Army transit station losing 400 soldiers against only 15 casualties on the Polish Army side. Later, it provided coast guard services in the Nazi controlled Danzig/Gdańsk.

On 8 September members of the SS Heimwehr Danzig killed 33 Polish civilians in the village of Książki. Other such militias were also involved in war crimes perpetrated on Polish civilians.

On 30 September 1939, the Heimwehr became part of the 3rd SS Panzer Division Totenkopf, forming the cadre of its artillery regiment.

=== Commanders ===
- SS-Obersturmbannführer Hans Friedemann Götze

=== Battle formation ===
- Military staff (SS-Obersturmbannführer Hans Friedemann Goetze; III./4. SS-Totenkopfstandarte "Ostmark")
- I. Rifle company (SS-Hauptsturmführer Karl Thier; 2. SS-Totenkopfstandarte "Brandenburg")
- II. Rifle company (SS-Obersturmführer Willy Bredemeier; 2. SS-Totenkopfstandarte "Brandenburg")
- III. Rifle company (SS-Hauptsturmführer George Braun; 2. SS-Totenkopfstandarte "Brandenburg")
- IV. Rifle company (SS-Hauptsturmführer Erich Urbanietz; 3. Totenkopfstandarte "Thüringen")
- V. Rifle company (SS-Hauptsturmführer Otto Baier, 6. SS-Standarte of the Allgemeine SS)
- 13. Infantry company (SS-Hauptsturmführer Walter Schulz; Stammabteilung 6 from the Allgemeine SS)
- 14. Antitank defense company (SS-Hauptsturmführer Josef Steiner; SD Main office)
- 15. Antitank defense company (SS-Obersturmführer Otto Leiner; 10. Standarte of the Allgemeine SS)

== The SS Wachsturmbann "Eimann" ==
The SS Wachsturmbann "Eimann" was set up in early June 1939 in Danzig by then SS-Sturmbannführer Kurt Eimann and was considered as an armed reserve of the Danzig SS-Standarte 36. It was used also in the Volksdeutsche (ethnic Germans) areas of the pre-war Polish Pomeranian Voivodeship, in order to induce ethnic Germans to join the SS, particularly the Totenkopfverbände.

The SS Wachsturmbann Eimann committed a number of massacres in the region between Kartuzy and Wejherowo from 13 September 1939. Most of the people murdered were Jews. The SS Wachsturmbann Eimann was disbanded in January 1940, with its members being transferred to the Totenkopf division.

=== Commanders ===
- SS-Sturmbannführer Kurt Eimann

=== Battle formation ===
- Command
- I. Squadron (one hundred men)
- II. Squadron
- III. Squadron
- IV. Squadron
- Truck squadron

After the "reunification of Danzig with the German Reich," the Wachsturmbann "Eimann" provided the staff for the newly established concentration camp Stutthof near Danzig. The Nazi government also employed it for "special police tasks" in the new Reichsgau Danzig-Westpreußen, which means it was used to persecute and imprison Polish Jews.

== Bibliography ==
- Stein, George (1984) [1966]. The Waffen-SS: Hitler's Elite Guard at War 1939–1945. Cornell University Press. ISBN 0-8014-9275-0.
- Sydnor, Charles W. (1990). Soldiers of Destruction : The SS Death's Head Division, 1933-1945. Princeton, New Jersey: Princeton University Press. ISBN 0691008531.
