= Defence of the Polish Post Office in Danzig =

1939 battle of the World War II

- Part of the Invasion of Poland
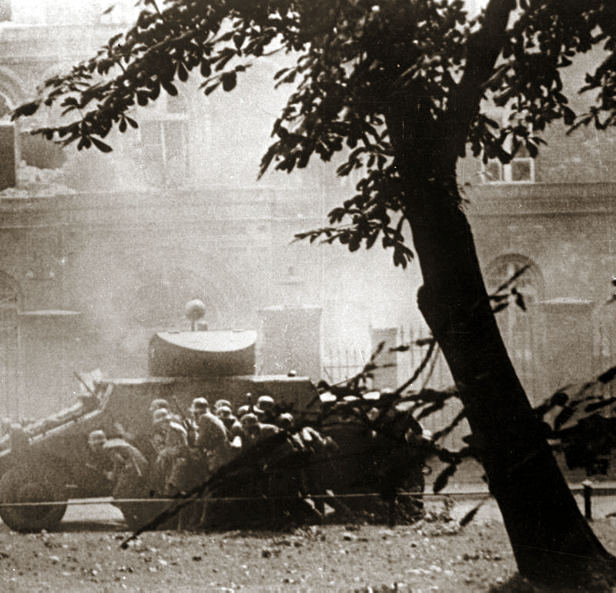
- Soldiers of the SS Heimwehr Danzig unit advance on the Polish post office while being covered by an ADGZ armored vehicle.
Date	1 September 1939
Location	Free City of Danzig 54°21′18″N 18°39′25″E
Result	Danzig/German victory

Belligerents
Poland	(Free City of Danzig) Free City of Danzig; Supported by: Germany

Commanders and leaders
(Second Polish Republic) Konrad Guderski † (Second Polish Republic) Alfons Flisykowski (executed)	(Free City of Danzig) Willi Bethke (Free City of Danzig) Alfred Heinrich † (Nazi Germany) Johannes Schaffer

Units involved
Post office workers and families	Free City of Danzig; Danzig Police; (Nazi Germany) SS Heimwehr Danzig; (Nazi Germany) Sturmabteilung

Strength
56 postmen & families (43 armed with pistols and grenades); 1 anti-tank rifle 3 Browning wz.1928 light machine guns	180 Danzig police 3 armoured cars 2 75mm artillery pieces 1 105mm howitzer

Casualties and losses
8 killed 14 wounded (6 died later); 38 captured	8–10 killed 21–22 wounded
- All Polish POWs executed.

The Defence of the Polish Post Office in Gdańsk (Danzig) was one of the first acts of World War II in Europe, as part of the September Campaign. On 1 September 1939 the Invasion of Poland was initiated by Germany when the battleship Schleswig-Holstein opened fire on the Polish-controlled harbor of Danzig, around 04:45. Danzig paramilitaries and police, supported by Germany, immediately joined the offensive to take full control of the city, by capturing the Polish post office. Polish personnel defended the building for some 15 hours against assaults by the SS Heimwehr Danzig (SS Danzig Home Defence), local SA formations and special units of Danzig police. All but four of the defenders, who were able to escape from the building during the surrender, were sentenced to death by a German court martial as illegal combatants on 5 October 1939, and executed (the judgement was later acknowledged as judicial murder).

== Prelude ==
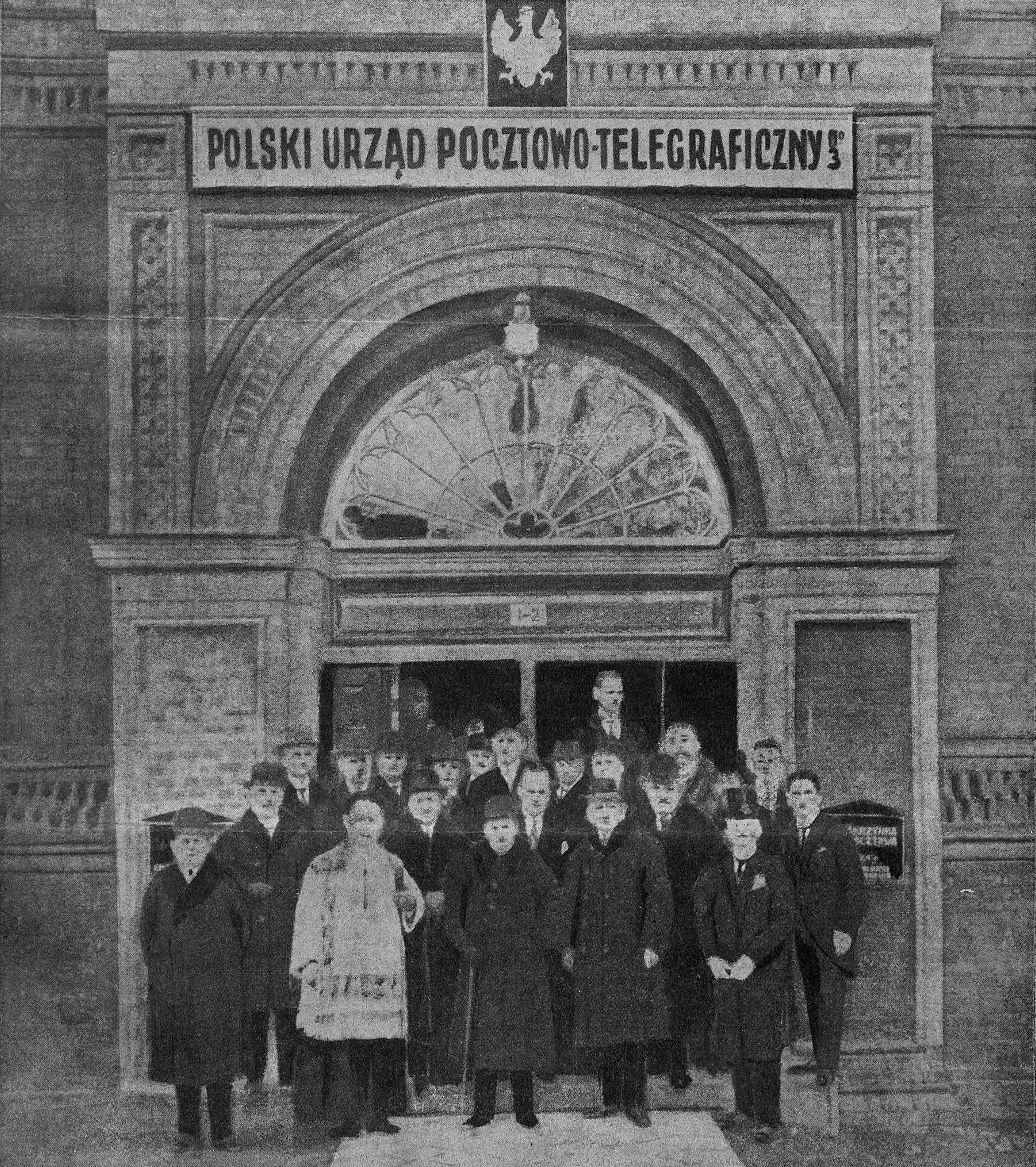
The opening of the Polish Post Office "Gdańsk 3" in 1925

The Polish Post Office (Poczta Polska) in the Free City of Danzig was created in 1920 under the Treaty of Versailles, and its buildings were considered extraterritorial Polish property. The Polish Post Office in Danzig comprised several buildings.

As tensions between Poland and Germany grew, in April 1939 the Polish High Command detached combat engineer and Army Reserve Sublieutenant (or 2LT) Konrad Guderski (1900–1939) to the Baltic Sea coast. With Alfons Flisykowski and others, he helped organise the official and volunteer security staff at the Polish Post Office in Danzig, and prepared them for possible hostilities. In addition to training the staff, he prepared the defences in and around the building: nearby trees were removed and the entrance was fortified. In mid-August, ten additional employees were sent to the post office from Polish Post offices in Gdynia and Bydgoszcz (mostly reserve non-commissioned officers).

In the Polish Post Office complex on 1 September 1939 there were 56 people: Guderski, 42 local Polish employees, ten employees from Gdynia and Bydgoszcz, and the building caretaker with his wife and ten-year-old daughter, Erwina, who lived in the complex. The Polish employees had a cache of weapons, consisting of three Browning wz.1928 light machine guns, 40 other firearms and three chests of hand grenades. The Polish defence plan assigned the defenders the role of keeping Germans from the main building for six hours, when a relief force from Pomeranian Army was supposed to secure the area.

The German attack plan, devised in July 1939, determined that the main building and its defenders would be stormed from two directions. A diversionary attack was to be carried out at the front entrance, while the main force would break through the wall from the neighbouring Work Office and attack from the side. Danzig Police also drew up plans for attacking the post office.

== Battle ==
At 04:00 the Germans cut the phone and electricity lines to the building. At 04:45, just as the German battleship Schleswig-Holstein started shelling the nearby Polish Army military outpost at Westerplatte, the Danzig police began their assault on the building under the command of Polizeioberst Willi Bethke. They were soon reinforced by local SA formations and the SS units SS Wachsturmbann "E" and SS Heimwehr Danzig, supported by three police ADGZ heavy armoured cars. Albert Forster, head of the local Nazi party, arrived in one of the vehicles to watch the event. Journalists from local newspapers, Reichssender Danzig (the state radio station), and the newsreel company Ufa-Tonwache also came to cover the battle.

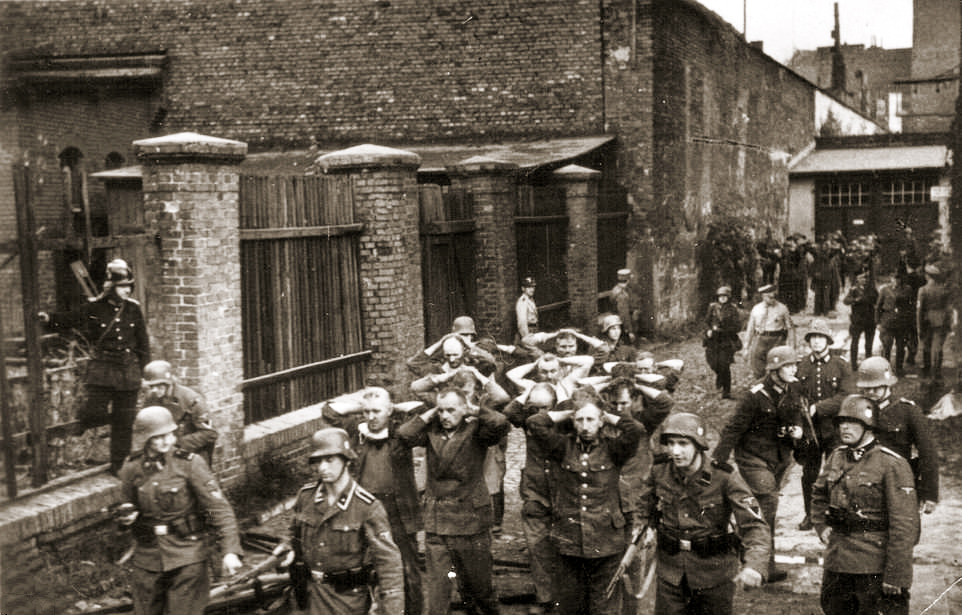
Captured Polish postmen being led away under SS escort, while SA men and Danzig Police look on

The first German attack, from the front, was repelled, although some Germans managed to break through the entrance and briefly enter the building (at the cost of two killed and seven wounded attackers, including one group leader). The second attack, from the work office, was also repelled. The commander of the Polish defence, Konrad Guderski, died during the second attack from the blast of his own grenade, which stopped the Germans who had broken through the wall. With the Poles putting up more determined resistance than expected, Bethke suggested that his forces blow up the building with high explosives. Forster vetoed his proposal.

At 11:00 German units were reinforced by the Wehrmacht with two 75 mm artillery pieces and a 105 mm howitzer, but the renewed assault, even with the artillery support, was again repulsed. Mortar support was requested from the German forces at Westerplatte, but its inaccurate fire posed a greater threat to the attackers and it soon ceased action. At 15:00, the Germans declared a two-hour ceasefire and demanded that the Polish forces surrender, which they refused. In the meantime, German sappers dug under the walls of the building and prepared a 600 kg explosive device. At 17:00, the bomb was set off, collapsing part of the wall, and German forces under the cover of three artillery pieces attacked again, this time capturing most of the building except the basement.

Frustrated by the Poles' refusal to surrender, Bethke requested a rail car full of gasoline. Danzig's fire department pumped it into the basement, and it was then ignited by a hand grenade. After three Poles were burned alive (bringing the total Polish casualties to six killed in action), the rest decided to capitulate. The first one to leave the building was the director, Dr. Jan Michoń. He carried a white flag but was shot by the Germans regardless. The next person, commandant Józef Wąsik, was burned alive by a flamethrower. The remaining defenders were allowed to surrender and leave the burning building. Six people managed to escape from the building and evade the Germans, although two of them were captured in the following days.

== Aftermath ==
Sixteen wounded prisoners were sent to the Gestapo hospital, where six subsequently died (including the 10-year-old Erwina, who died due to burns several weeks later). The other 28 were first imprisoned in the police building and, after a few days, sent to the Victoriaschule, where they were interrogated and tortured. Some 300 to 400 Polish citizens of Danzig were also held there.

=== Courts martial and executions ===
All the prisoners were put on trial in front of the martial court of the Wehrmacht's Gruppe Eberhardt. A first group of 28 Victoriaschule prisoners, with a single Wehrmacht officer as defence lawyer, was tried on 8 September, a second group of 10, who recovered in the hospital, on 30 September. All were sentenced to death as illegal combatants under the German special military penal law of 1938. The sentence was demanded by the prosecutor Hans-Werner Giesecke and declared by presiding judge Kurt Bode, vice-president of the Oberlandesgericht Danzig (Higher Regional Court of Danzig). Twenty-eight of the judgements were countersigned, and thus became legally valid, by General Hans Günther von Kluge, the further 10 by Colonel Eduard Wagner. A clemency appeal was rejected by General Walther von Brauchitsch.

The prisoners were mostly executed by firing squad led by SS-Sturmbannführer Max Pauly (later commandant of the Neuengamme concentration camp) on 5 October and buried in a mass grave at the cemetery of Danzig-Saspe (Zaspa). One, Leon Fuz, was later recognized and murdered in the Stutthof concentration camp in November. Four defenders who managed to escape and hide survived the war. The families of the postmen were also persecuted. A similar fate awaited eleven Polish railway workers from Tczew south of the city, who were executed by the SA after they foiled a German attempt to use an armoured train in a sneak attack.

Wagner, a conspirator in the 20 July plot later committed suicide on 23 July 1944, after the plan's failure. Kluge killed himself on 19 August 1944. Pauly was executed by the British for other crimes in 1946, and Brauchitsch died in British custody while awaiting trial for war crimes in 1948. However, Giesecke and Bode were never held responsible for this episode or held accountable for the executions. They were denazified after the war and continued their careers as lawyers in Germany. Both died of natural causes in the 1970s. Only in 1997–1998 did the German court at Lübeck (the Große Strafkammer IIb and the Dritte Große Strafkammer) invalidate the 1939 Nazi sentence, citing among the reasons that the special military penal law had only taken effect in Danzig on 16 November 1939 and charged the presiding judge with negligence of his duties. The decision of the German court occurred thanks to the work of a German author, Dieter Schenk, who published a monograph on the defence of the post office and referred to the execution of the defenders as judicial murder (Justizmord). Schenk stresses the commanding role of Danzig police forces, which made a Wehrmacht court martial not competent to convict the defenders. Instead, the Free City of Danzig's penal law would have been applicable, without the option of a death penalty.

=== Cultural legacy ===
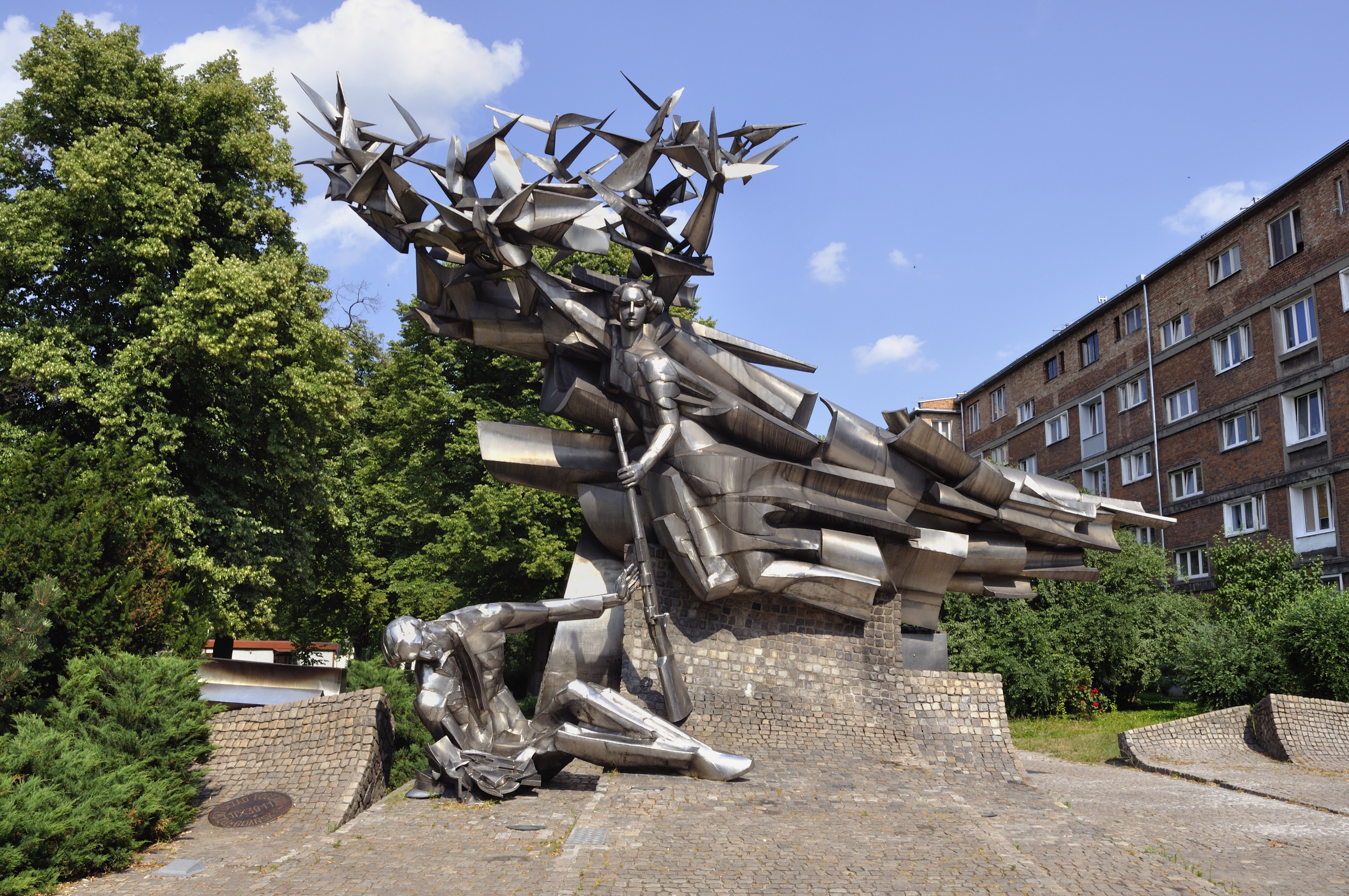
Monument to the Defenders of the Polish Post Office, Gdańsk

In Poland, the episode has become one of the better known episodes of the Polish September Campaign and it is usually portrayed as a heroic story of David and Goliath proportions. In this view, it was a group of postmen who held out against German SS troops for almost an entire day.

The Polish defence of the post office was also sympathetically portrayed in Chapter 18 of The Tin Drum (1959) by Günter Grass, 'The Defence of the Polish Post Office'. In the chapter, the protagonist Oskar Matzerath meets his presumptive father Jan Bronski as the latter heads home, trying to avoid fighting in the looming battle. Upon meeting Oskar, Jan returns to the post office, taking Oskar with him. Oskar is present during the siege, and portrays his presumptive father negatively to the SS, leading him to find himself guilty of Jan's execution. In the novel's penultimate chapter, Oskar and his friend Vittlar after the war encounter in Düsseldorf a survivor of the siege, Viktor Weluhn, whom two men were preparing to execute for his actions at the siege. Viktor and his executioners disappear into the night later in the chapter, with Viktor's fate left unknown.

In 1979, the Defenders of the Polish Post Office Monument was unveiled in Gdańsk. In 2012 the Polish rock/metal band Horytnica has written a song titled "Obrońca Poczty w Gdańsku" ("Defender of the Post Office in Danzig"). The defence of the post office is dramatised in the first episode of the 2019 British war drama series World on Fire.

In 2021, the solo board game "Soldiers in Postmen's Uniforms" was published by Dan Verssen Games letting the player "recreate the historic accomplishment of the Polish postal workers by defending the post office during the day-long siege."

== See also ==
- Battle of Westerplatte
- The Tin Drum and The Tin Drum (film)
- Defense of Sihang Warehouse
- List of World War II military equipment of Poland
- List of German military equipment of World War II
- List of last stands
