= Gdańsk =

City in Pomeranian Voivodeship, Poland

- City county
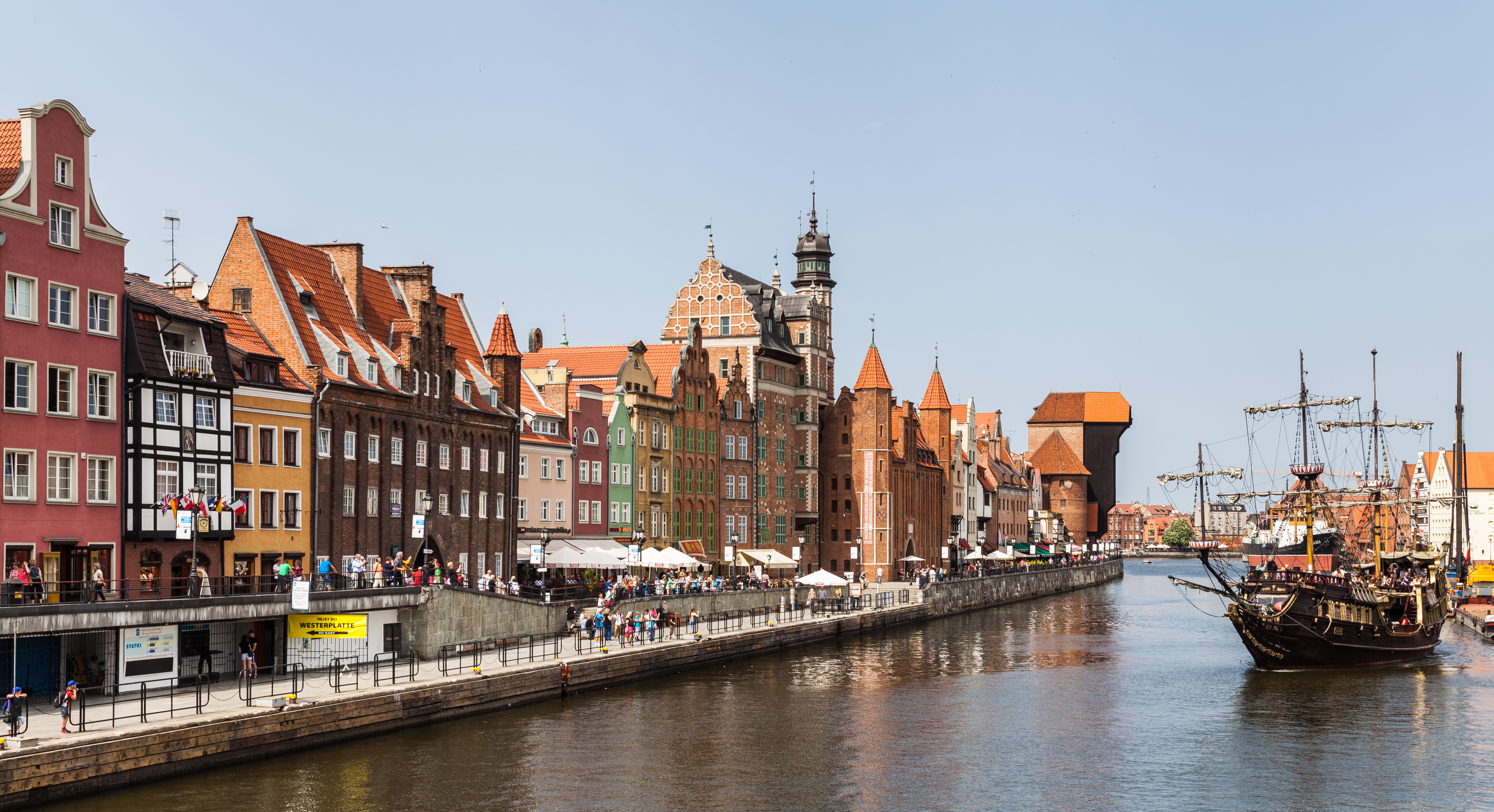
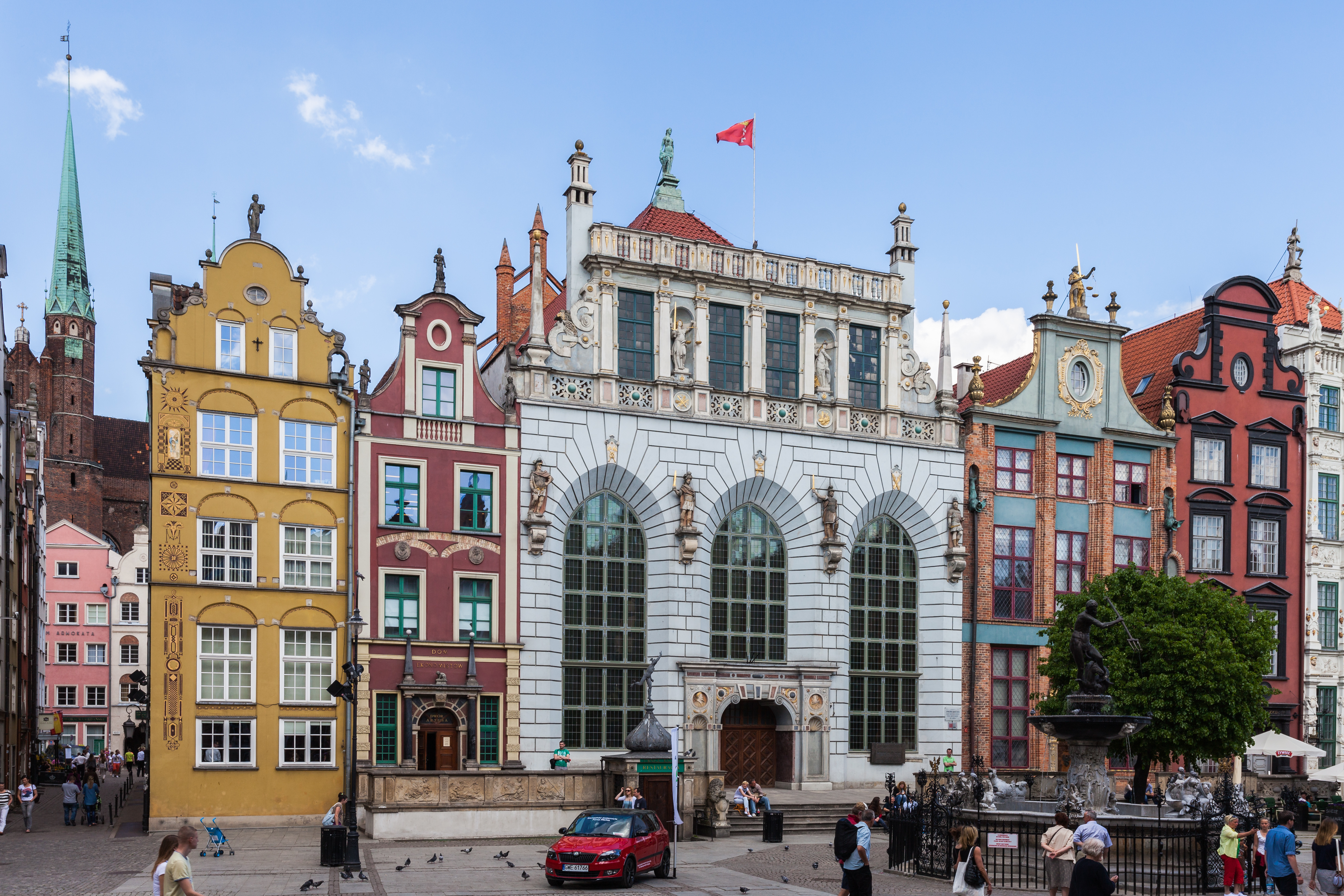
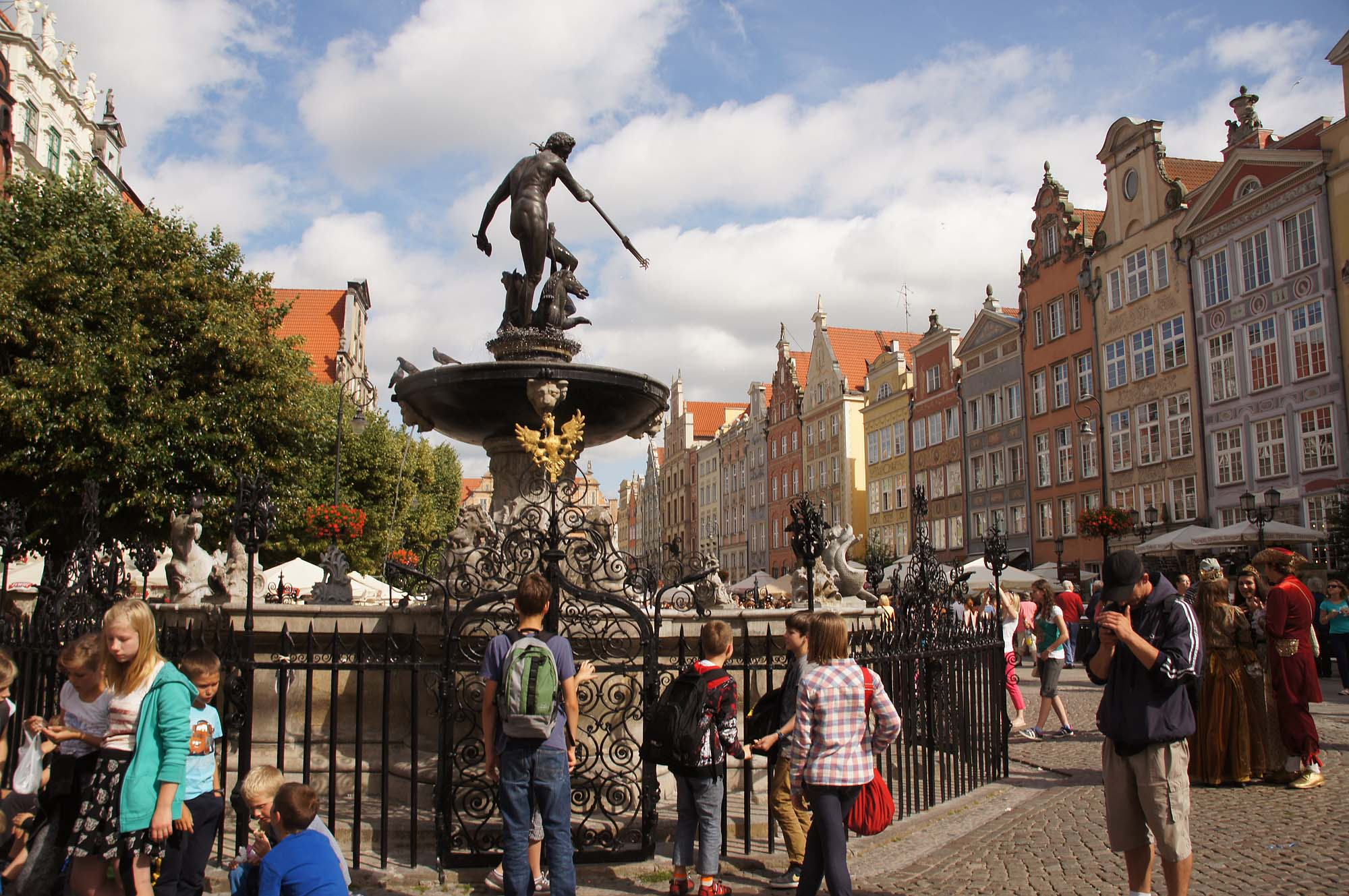
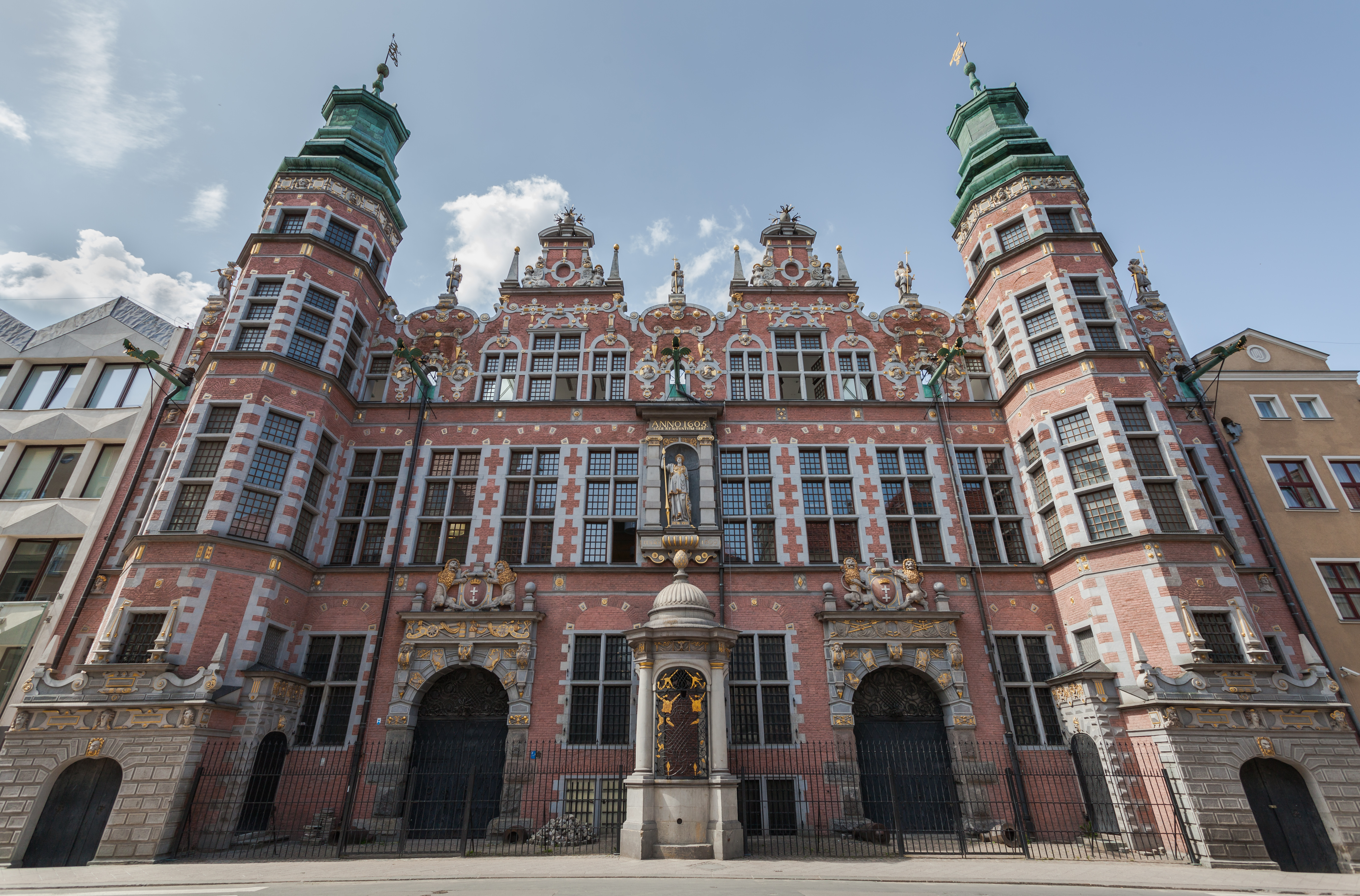
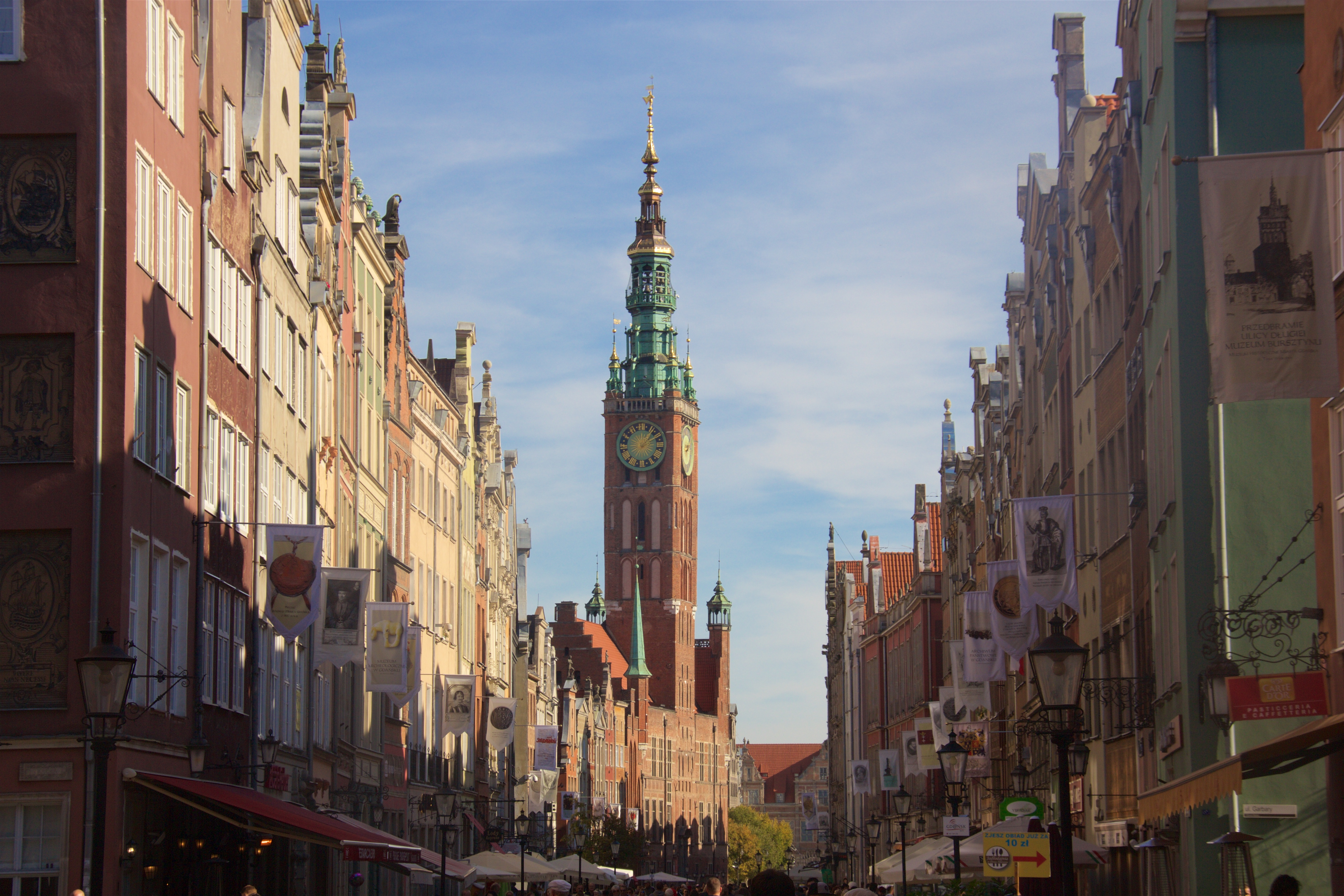
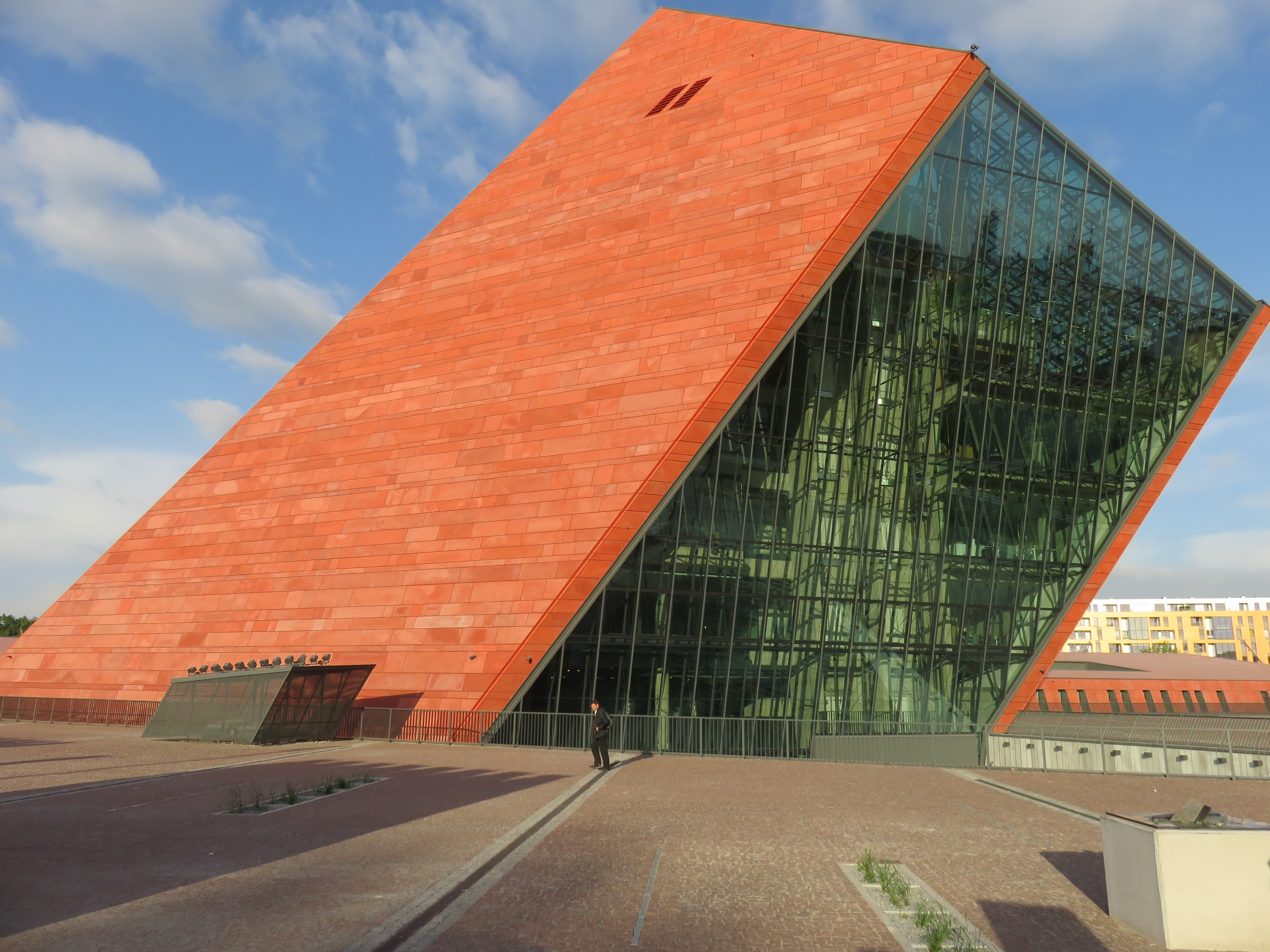
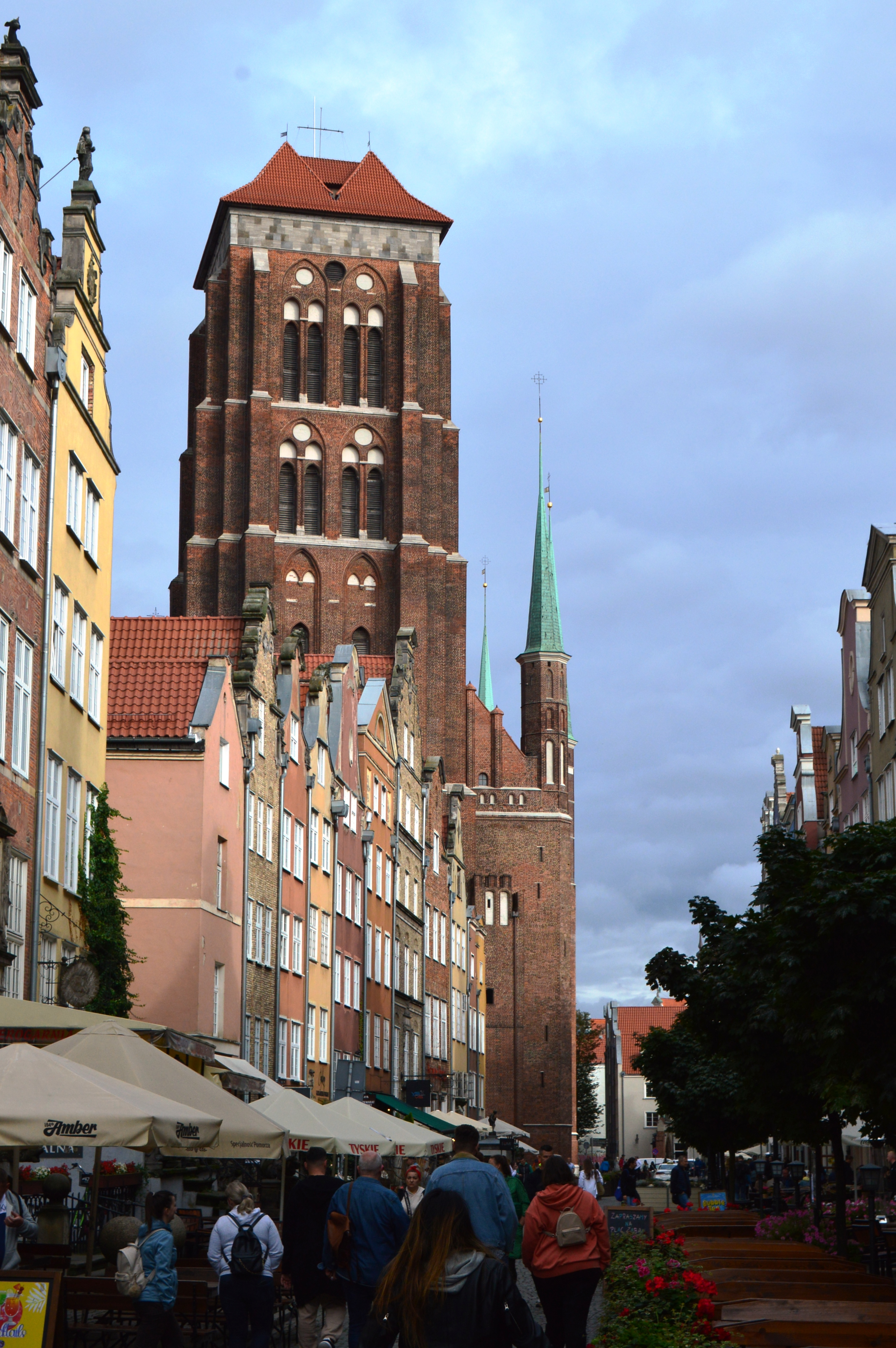
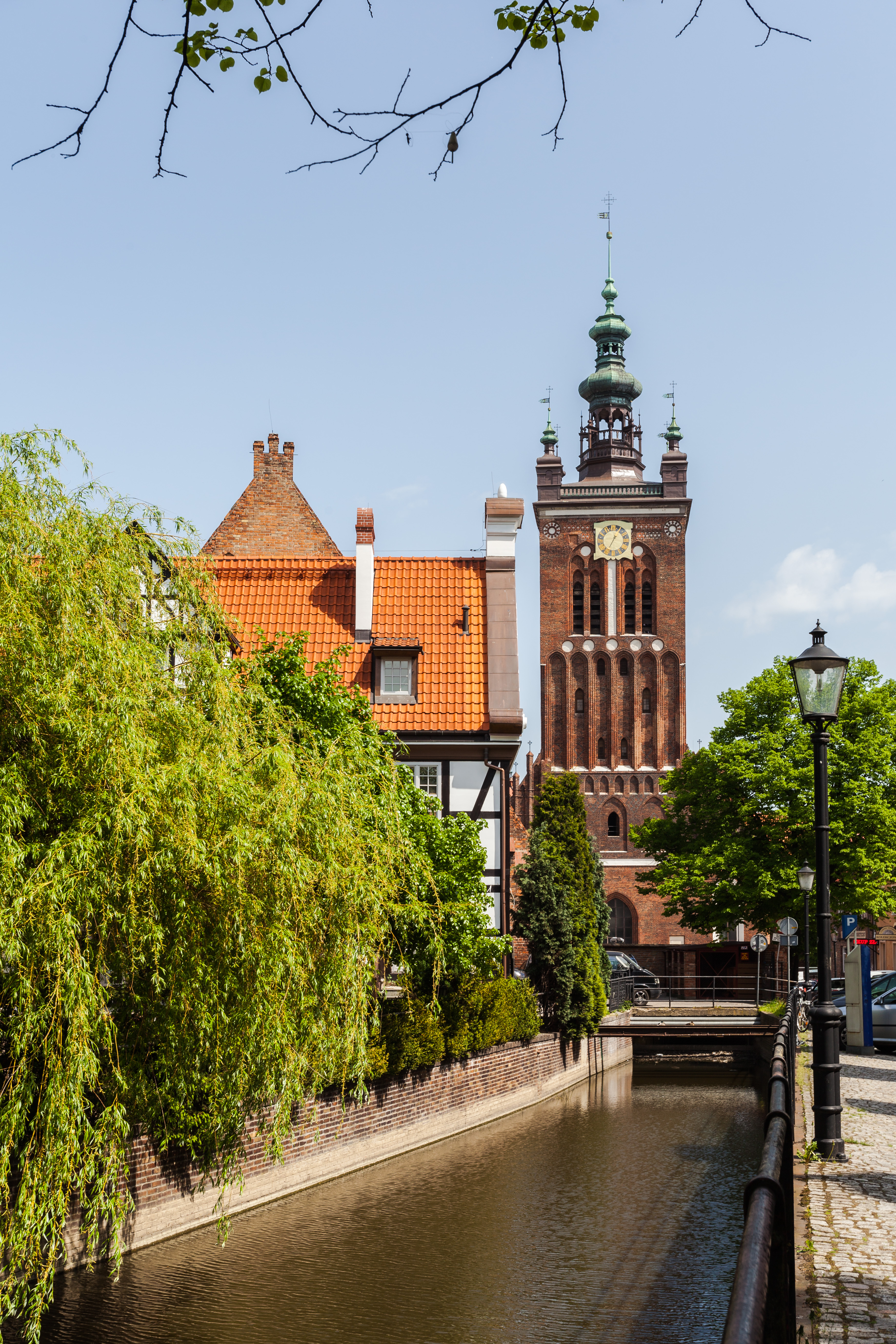
- Motława River and the Gdańsk Crane Artus Court Neptune's Fountain Mannerist Armoury Long Lane, City Hall Museum of the Second World War St. Mary's Church Radunia Canal

- Flag Coat of arms
- Motto(s): Nec temere, nec timide (Neither rashly, nor timidly)
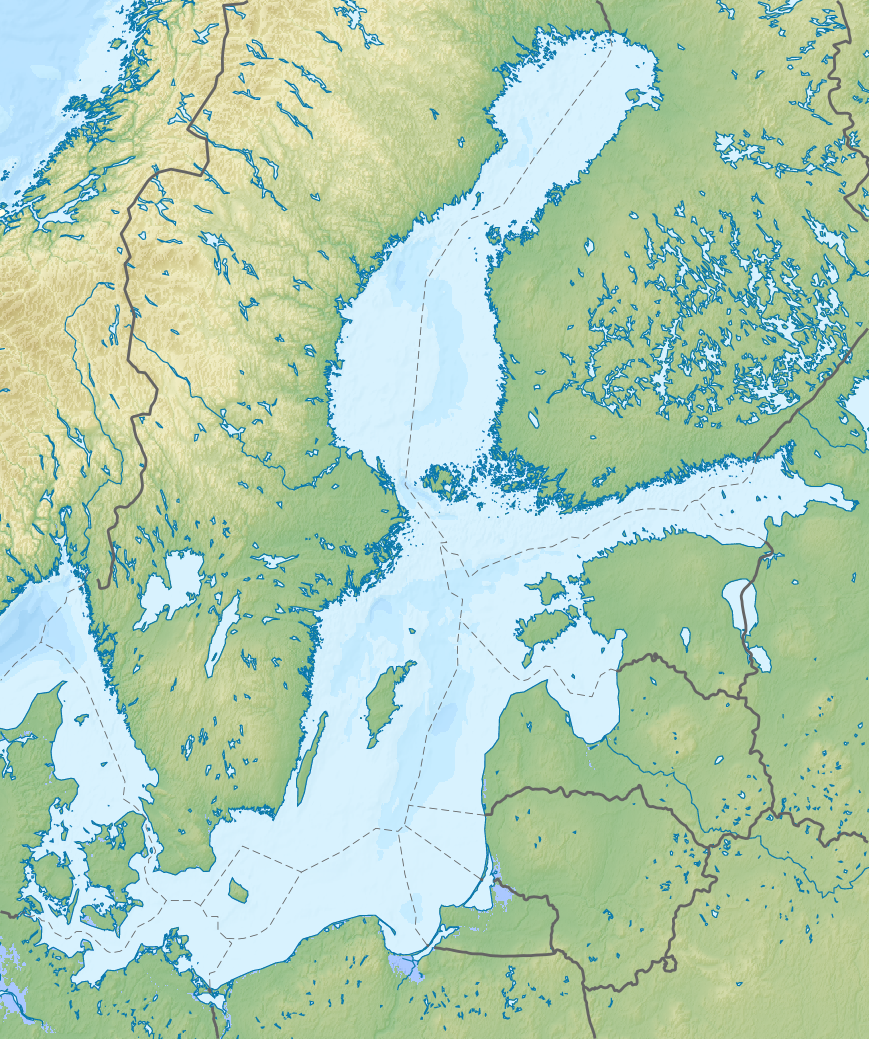
- Location in Poland Gdańsk (Baltic Sea) Gdańsk (Europe)
- Coordinates: 54°20′51″N 18°38′43″E
- Country: Poland
- Voivodeship: Pomeranian
- County: city county
- Established: 10th century
- City rights: 1263

Government
  - Body: Gdańsk City Council
  - City mayor: Aleksandra Dulkiewicz (Independent)

Area
  - City county: 683 km^{2} (264 sq mi)
  - Urban: 414.81 km^{2} (160.16 sq mi)
- Highest elevation: 180 m (590 ft)

Population (2023)
  - City county: 487,371 (6th)
  - Density: 1,800/km^{2} (4,700/sq mi)
  - Urban (Tricity): 920,000
  - Metro (Tricity): 1,100,050

GDP
  - Urban: €20.529 billion (2020)
- Time zone: UTC+01:00 (CET)
  - Summer (DST): UTC+02:00 (CEST)
- Postal code: 80-008 to 80–958
- Area code: +48 58
- Car plates: GD, XD
- Website: gdansk.pl

Historic Monument of Poland
- Official name: Gdańsk – city within the 17th-century fortifications
- Designated: 8 September 1994
- Reference no.: M.P., 1994, vol. 50, No. 415

Gdańsk (Note: Pronunciation: English: /ɡəˈdænsk/ gə-DANSK, US also /ɡəˈdɑːnsk/ gə-DAHNSK; Polish: [ˈɡdaj̃sk], sometimes [ˈɡdaɲsk].) (Kashubian: Gduńsk), (Note: Pronounced [ɡduɲsk].) historically known in English as Danzig, (Note: Pronunciation: English: /ˈdæn(t)sɪɡ/ DAN(T)-sig or /ˈdænzɪɡ/ DAN-zig; German: [ˈdantsɪç] or [ˈdantsɪk].) is a city on the Baltic coast of northern Poland, and the capital of the Pomeranian Voivodeship. With a population of 486,492, it is Poland's sixth-largest city and its major seaport. Gdańsk lies at the mouth of the Motława River and is situated at the southern edge of Gdańsk Bay, close to the city of Gdynia and the resort town of Sopot; these form a metropolitan area called the Tricity (Trójmiasto), with a population of approximately 1.5 million.

Gdańsk was first mentioned in 997 as part of the Duchy of Poland, and thereafter grew into a trading town under the Piast and Samboride dynasties. Shifting between Polish and Teutonic control during the Middle Ages, it subsequently joined the Hanseatic League and, with considerable autonomy, served as the Polish Crown's principal seaport and largest city until the early 18th century. With the Partitions of Poland, the city was annexed by Prussia in 1793, and was integrated into the German Empire in 1871. It was a free city from 1807 to 1814 and from 1920 to 1939. On 1 September 1939, it was the site of a military clash at Westerplatte, one of the first events of World War II. The contemporary city was shaped by extensive border changes, the flight and expulsion of the German population and Polish resettlement after 1945. In the 1980s, Gdańsk was the birthplace of the Solidarity trade union and movement, which helped precipitate the collapse of communism in Europe.

The city is home to the University of Gdańsk, Gdańsk University of Technology, the National Museum, the Gdańsk Shakespeare Theatre, the Museum of the Second World War, the Polish Baltic Philharmonic, the Polish Space Agency and the European Solidarity Centre. Among Gdańsk's most notable historical landmarks are the Town Hall, the Green Gate, Artus Court, Neptune's Fountain, and St. Mary's Church, one of the largest brick churches in the world. The city is served by Gdańsk Lech Wałęsa Airport, the country's third busiest airport and the most important international airport in northern Poland.

Gdańsk is one of the most visited cities in Poland, having received 4.5 million tourists in 2024, especially from Scandinavia and Germany. The city hosts St. Dominic's Fair, which dates back to 1260, and is regarded as one of the biggest trade and cultural events in Europe. In a 2019 quality of life poll, Gdańsk ranked highest among Polish cities. Its historic city centre has been listed as one of Poland's national monuments. In 2025, Gdańsk became a UNESCO City of Literature.

== Names ==
=== Etymology ===
The name of the city was most likely derived from Gdania, a river presently known as Motława on which the city is situated. Other linguists also argue that the name stems from the Proto-Slavic adjective/prefix gъd-, which meant 'wet' or 'moist' with the addition of the morpheme ń/ni and the suffix -sk.

=== History ===
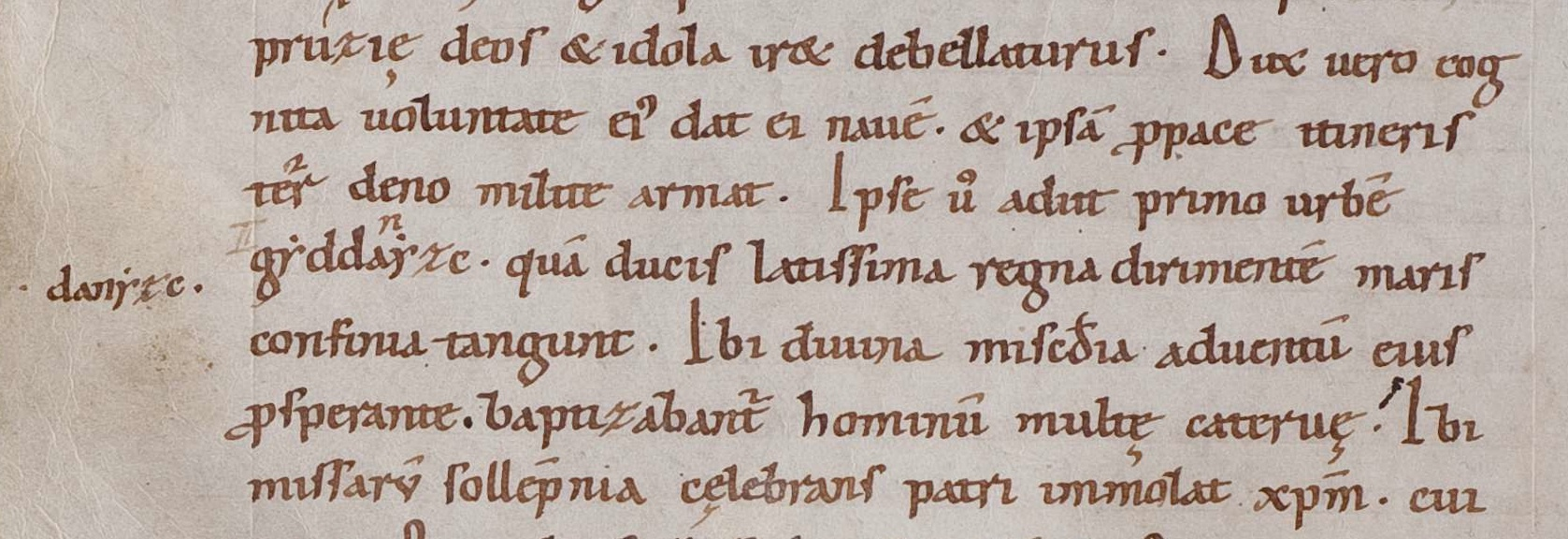
A manuscript fragment featuring gydda^{n}yzc

The name of the settlement was recorded after St. Adalbert's death in 997 CE, in his first biography, as urbs Gyddanyzc and it was later written as Kdanzk in 1148, Gdanzc in 1188, Danceke in 1228, Gdańsk in 1236, (Note: Also in 1454, 1468, 1484, and 1590) Danzc in 1263, Danczk in 1311, (Note: Also in 1399, 1410, and 1414–1438) Danczik in 1399, (Note: Also in 1410, 1414) Danczig in 1414, and Gdąnsk in 1656.

In Polish documents, the form Gdańsk was always used. In German-language documents, multiple variants of the name were recorded over time. The cluster "gd" became "d" (Danzc from 1263), the combination "ns" became "nts" (Danczk from 1311), and finally an epenthetical "i" broke up the final cluster (Danczik from 1399).

In Polish, the modern name of the city is pronounced [ɡdaj̃sk]. In English (where the diacritic over the "n" is frequently omitted) the usual pronunciation is /ɡəˈdænsk/ or /ɡəˈdɑːnsk/. The German name, Danzig, is usually pronounced [ˈdantsɪç], or alternatively [ˈdantsɪk] in more Southern German-speaking areas. The city's Latin name may be given as either Gedania, Gedanum, or Dantiscum.

=== Ceremonial names ===
In the Kashubian language, the city is called Gduńsk. On special occasions, the city is also referred to as "The Royal Polish City of Gdańsk" (Polish: Królewskie Polskie Miasto Gdańsk; Latin: Regia Civitas Polonica Gedanensis; Kashubian: Królewsczi Pòlsczi Gard Gduńsk). Although some Kashubians may also use the name "Our Capital City Gduńsk" (Nasz Stoleczny Gard Gduńsk) or "Our [regional] Capital City Gduńsk" (Stoleczny Kaszëbsczi Gard Gduńsk), the cultural and historical connections between the city and the region of Kashubia are debatable and use of such names raises controversy among Kashubians.

== History ==
=== Prehistory ===
The oldest evidence found for the existence of a settlement on the lands of what is now Gdańsk comes from the Bronze Age (which is estimated to be from c. 2500–1700 BC) and the Iron Age (c. 1200–550 BC). Archaeological finds testify to the existence of the Lusatian culture and amber trade along the so-called Amber Road.

=== Duchy of Poland and Samborid rule ===
The origins of the settlement that is now known as Gdańsk remain uncertain. Archaeological and environmental studies indicate increasing settlement activity in the area during the 10th century. The earliest written reference to the settlement appears in a biography of Saint Adalbert written before 1000, which records his visit in 997 to a town (Latin: urbs) named Gyddanyzc, then ruled by Bolesław I the Brave of Poland. Although generally identified with Gdańsk, the precise location of this early settlement has not been securely established.

Archaeological research has identified a 10th-century fortified site at the location of the modern-day Góra Gradowa sub-district of Gdańsk. A later stronghold was established near the confluence of the Motława and Vistula rivers, probably in the 1050s or 1060s. Earlier interpretations attributed this riverside stronghold to Mieszko I and dated its construction to the 980s, but this dating has been superseded by dendrochronological research.

Gdańsk was ruled by the Samborides as part of the Duchy of Pomerelia, a fief of the Duchy of Poland since 1119. The early settlement was inhabited mainly by Slavic (Pomeranian) fishermen and craftsmen. According to a 1148 papal bull, Gdańsk was part of the Polish diocese of Włocławek. Beginning approximately in 1180, the city’s increasing involvement in Baltic trade attracted numerous German settlers, the majority of whom came from Lübeck. Henceforth, the site consisted of a settlement at the modern Long Market, settlements of craftsmen along the Old Ditch, the old Piast stronghold and the newly established German merchant settlements around St Nicholas' Church.

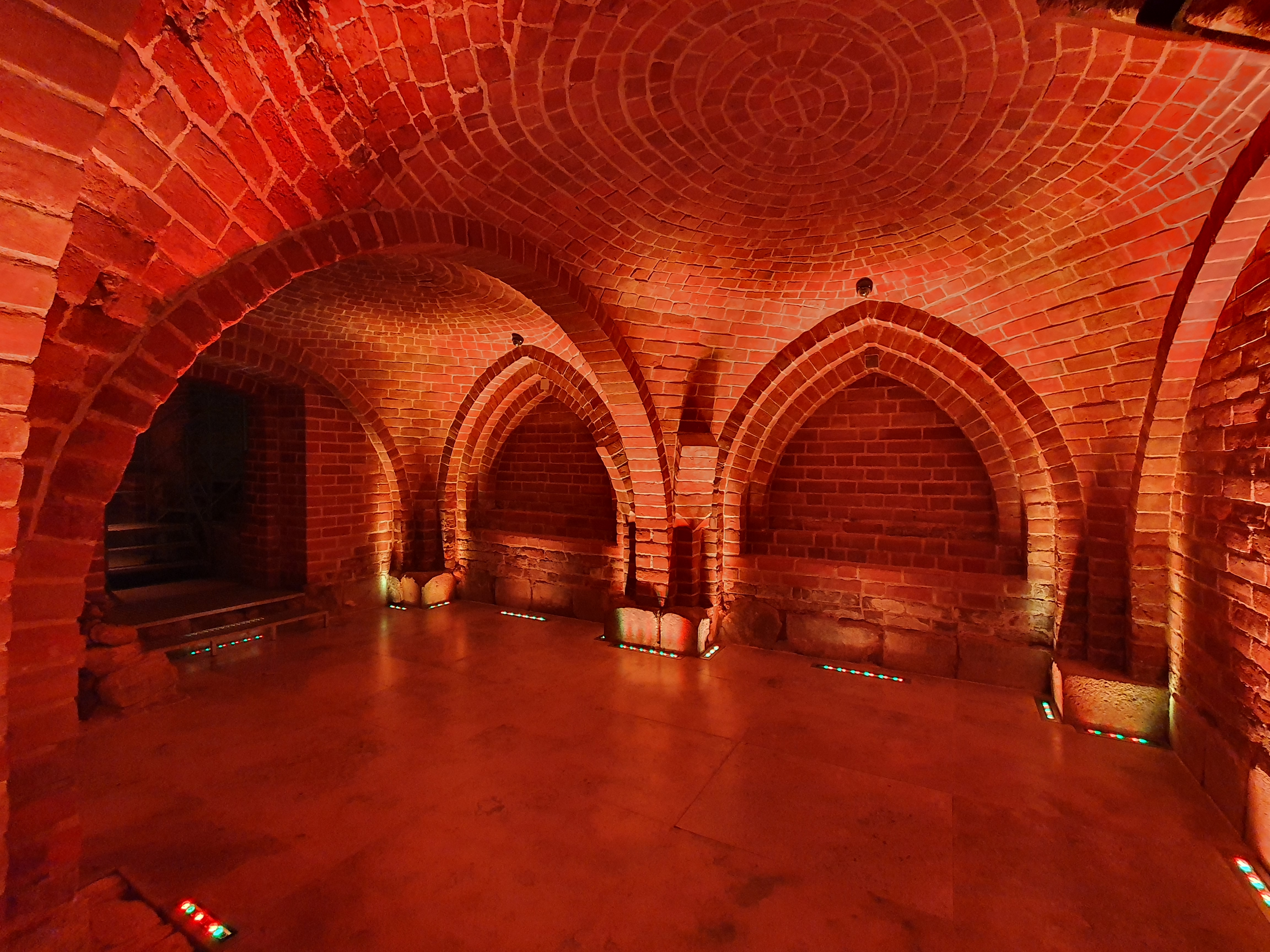
Excavated cellars of a 13th-century Dominican monastery in Gdańsk

Since 1227, Świętopełk II ruled Pomerelia as an independent duchy and the town subsequently became part of the Duchy of Gdańsk. It was at this time that Gdańsk became an important trading town on the lower Vistula. Between 1242–1248 and 1252–1254, Świętopełk fought against the Teutonic Order, who were supported by Lübeck. These conflicts hindered the transformation of the German colony into an autonomous town at this time. Migration of merchants to the town resumed in 1257. At the latest in 1263, Pomerelian duke Świętopełk II granted city rights under Lübeck law to the emerging market settlement. It was an autonomy charter similar to that of Lübeck, which was also the primary origin of many settlers. In a document of 1271 the Pomerelian duke Mestwin II addressed the Lübeck merchants settled in the city as his loyal citizens from Germany.

As Mestwin II was the last male representative of his dynasty, his death in 1294 precipitated a contest for control of the city and its surrounding region, involving the Polish Piast dynasty, the Přemyslid rulers of Bohemia, the German Margraves of Brandenburg, and the Teutonic Order. In 1300, the town had an estimated population of 2,000. While overall the town was not an important trade centre at that time, it had relevance in regional trade.

=== Teutonic Order ===
In 1308, following a rebellion instigated against Bogusza, the governor of Gdańsk who was appointed by the future king of Poland, Władysław I the Elbow-high, the town was taken by Brandenburg. Polish forces, under siege in the stronghold, sought aid from the Teutonic Knights, who freed them and proceeded to seize the town, which had previously acknowledged Brandenburg's authority. Subsequently, the Teutonic Order massacred not only the Brandenburg forces and the Pomeranian knights who supported them, but also the town's inhabitants. Błażej Śliwiński (2008) estimates that the overall number of killed was between 50 and 60 Pomeranian and Brandenburg knights, and 1,000 commoners from of the town's population and the adjacent settlements, which he estimates at the time numbered between 2,000 and 3,000 people. Śliwiński & Możejko (2017) give the estimated number of victims as approximately 1,000. According to Smoliński (2021), the death toll is estimated to lie between 60 and 150. The events were used by the Polish Crown to condemn the Teutonic Order in a subsequent papal lawsuit. After the takeover, the Teutonic Knights faced charges that they committed a massacre in a papal bull issued by Clement V.

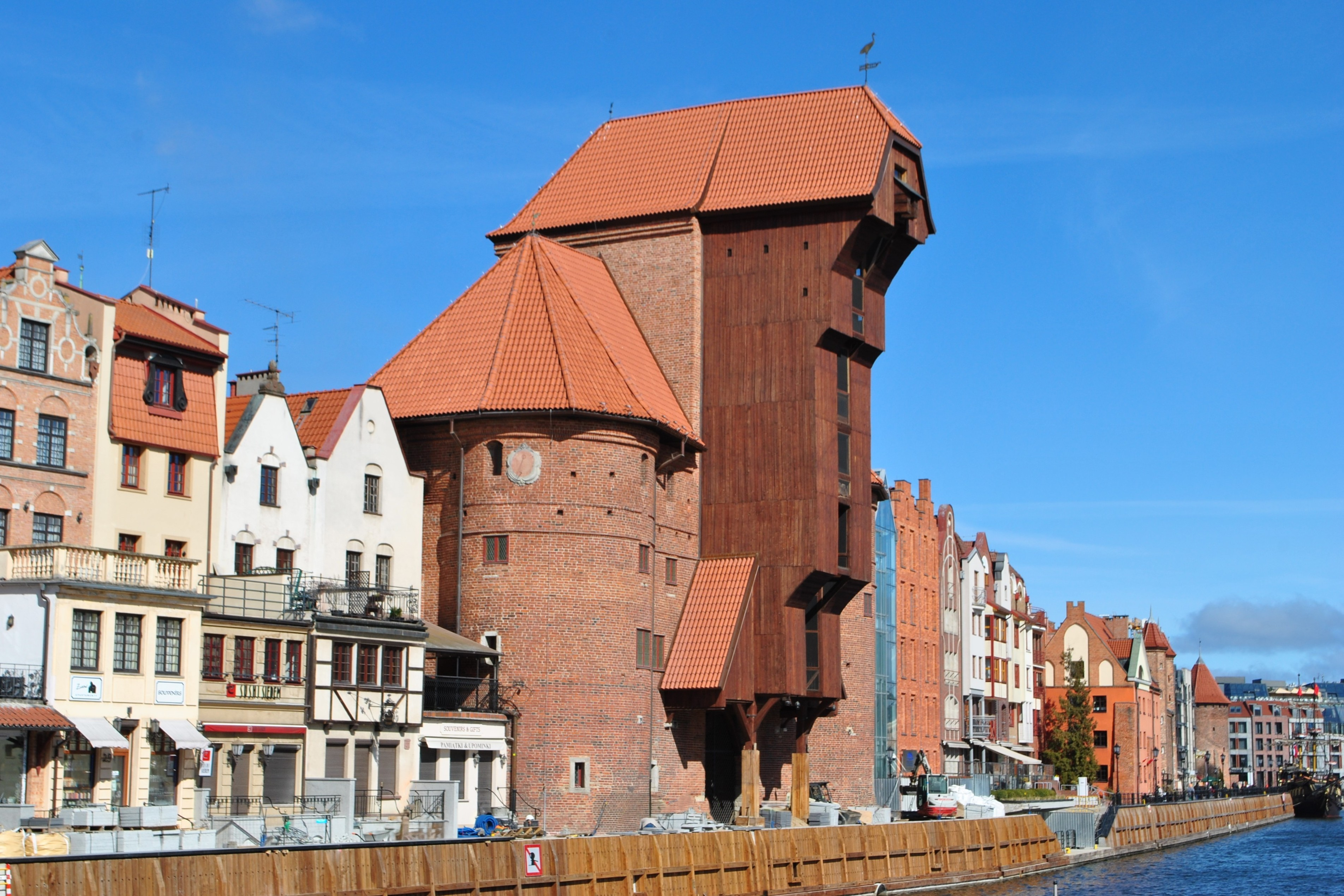
Gdańsk Crane, the largest medieval port crane, was completed in 1444.

The Teutonic Knights incorporated the town into their monastic state and instructed the remaining burghers to depart. In 1308, they founded Osiek Hakelwerk near the town, initially as a Lechitic fishing settlement. The Order did not rebuild the town until the mid-1320s, when some of its former inhabitants—primarily Lübeckers, who also brought back the pre-1308 town seal—returned, alongside settlers from other German regions. The town saw a rapid rise in population and became almost completely German; it would become primarily known by its German name, Danzig. In 1340, the Teutonic Order constructed a large fortress, the Gdańsk Castle, which became the seat of the knights' Komtur. After a series of Polish–Teutonic Wars, King Casimir of Poland recognized the Teutonic Order’s possession of Danzig and Pomerelia in the Treaty of Kalisz (1343), and the Order acknowledged that it would hold Danzig and Pomerelia as a grant from the Polish Crown. By accepting this grant, the Teutonic Order thus recognised the previous rights of Polish monarchs to the seized territories, something which they had previously denied, also this allowed for future claims by the Crown for the territories to be returned. The city thrived as a result of increased exports of grain (especially wheat), timber, potash, tar, and other goods of forestry from Prussia and Poland via the Vistula River trading routes. The Order's religious networks helped to develop Danzig's literary culture.

In 1346, Teutonic Order changed the Town Law of the city, which then consisted only of the Rechtstadt, to Kulm law. In 1358, Danzig joined the Hanseatic League, and became an active member in 1361. It maintained relations with the trade centres Bruges, Novgorod, Lisbon, and Seville. Around 1377, the Old Town was equipped with city rights as well. In 1380, the New Town was founded as the third, independent settlement. Urban growth was mainly driven by migration from German-speaking lands. A new war broke out in 1409, culminating in the Battle of Grunwald (1410), and the city came under the control of the Kingdom of Poland. A year later, with the First Peace of Thorn, it returned to the Teutonic Order. In 1440, the city participated in the foundation of the Prussian Confederation, an organisation opposed to the rule of the Teutonic Order. Following a fire in 1442, the Crane Gate, one of the city's present-day landmarks, was constructed in 1444 under the sanction of the Order. In a complaint of 1453, the Prussian Confederation mentioned repeated cases in which the Teutonic Order imprisoned or murdered local patricians and mayors without a court verdict.

=== Kingdom of Poland ===
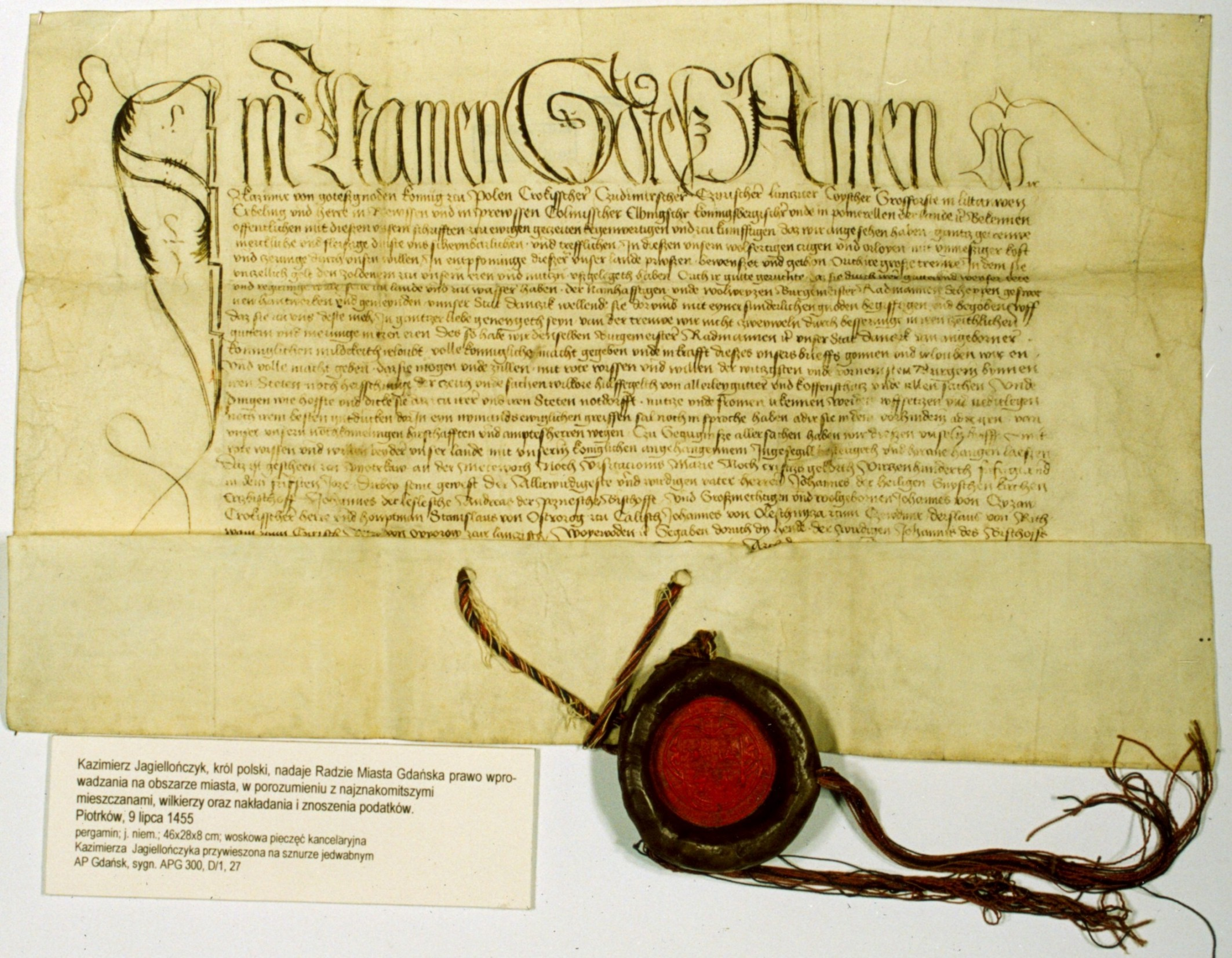
Original charter of 1455 by King Casimir IV granting Danzig the right to independently levy and abolish taxes

In 1454, the Prussian Confederation renounced its obedience to the Grand Master of the Teutonic Order and appealed to King Casimir IV of Poland for the territory’s reintegration into the Kingdom of Poland. This led to the Thirteen Years' War between Poland and the State of the Teutonic Order (1454–1466). The local mayor pledged allegiance to the king during the incorporation in March 1454 in Kraków, and the city again solemnly pledged allegiance to the king in June 1454 in Elbing (Elbląg), recognizing the prior Teutonic annexation and rule as unlawful. The incorporation considerably strengthened Danzig’s position, as the king granted the city extensive privileges on 16 June 1454. In 1455, the king conferred additional rights on the city, including the right to enact its own laws and to impose taxes.

On 15 May 1457, King Casimir IV granted the town the Great Privilege, after he had been invited by the town's council and had already stayed in town for five weeks. With the Great Privilege, the town was granted full autonomy and protection by the king of Poland. The privilege removed tariffs and taxes on trade within Poland, Lithuania, and Ruthenia (present day Belarus and Ukraine), and conferred on the town independent jurisdiction, legislation and administration of its territory, as well as the right to mint its own coin, the Danzig thaler. Furthermore, the privilege united the Old Town and Main Town and legalised the demolition of New Town, which had sided with the Teutonic Order. By 1457, New Town was demolished completely and no buildings remained.

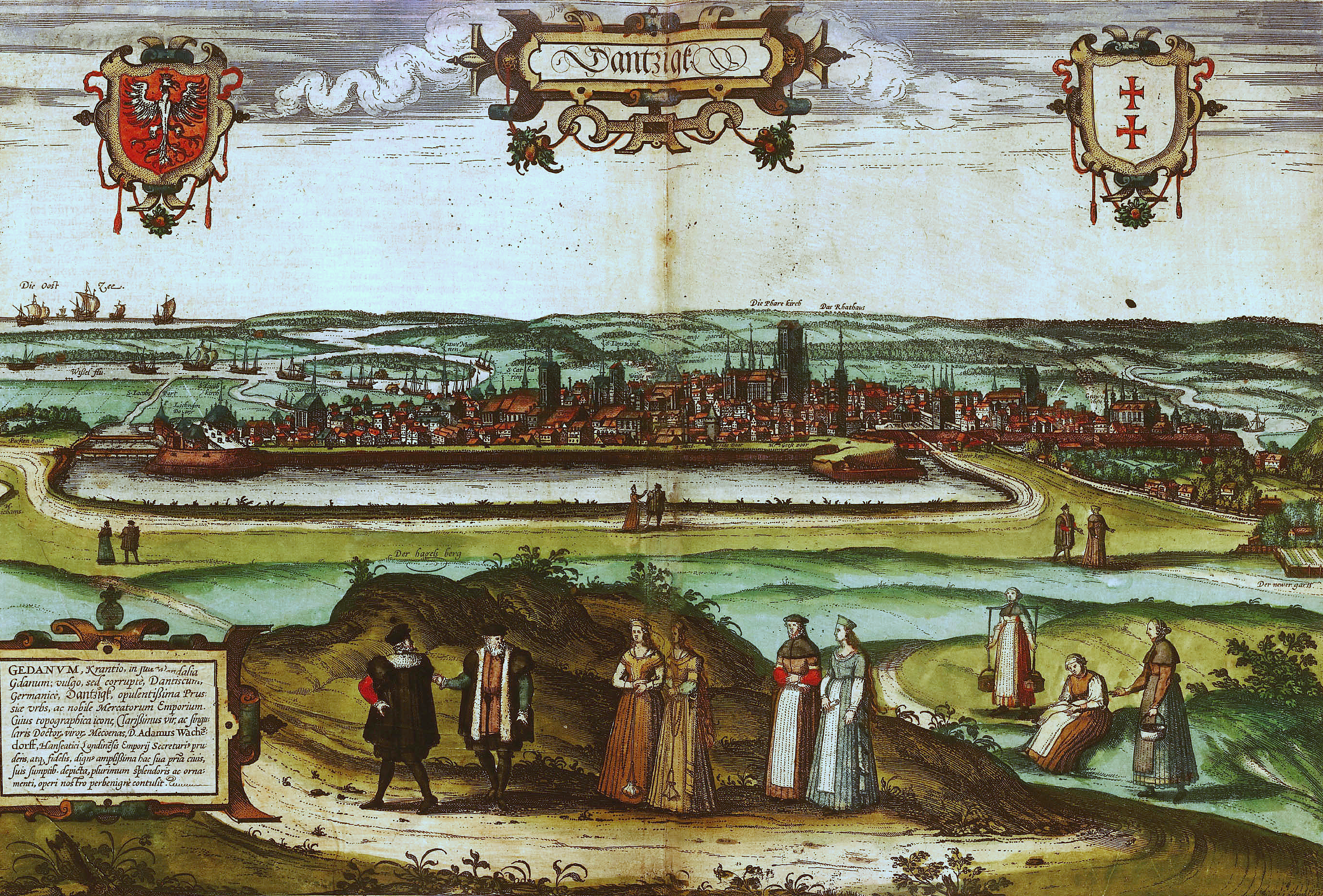
Danzig in the 16th century, published by Georg Braun and Frans Hogenberg

Gaining free and privileged access to Polish markets, the seaport prospered while simultaneously trading with the other Hanseatic cities. After the Second Peace of Thorn (1466) between Poland and the Teutonic Order, the warfare ended permanently. The Order recognised Danzig’s incorporation into the Kingdom of Poland and the city became part of the autonomous province of Royal Prussia (which in 1569 became part of the larger Greater Poland Province). The city was visited by Nicolaus Copernicus in 1504 and 1526, and Narratio Prima, the first printed abstract of his heliocentric theory, was published there in 1540. During the Protestant Reformation, most German-speaking inhabitants adopted Lutheranism. Following the Reformation, High German soon prevailed in Danzig, where Low German had long served as the administrative language owing to the city’s Hanseatic ties. In 1566, High German also replaced Low German as the language of the courts. After the Union of Lublin between Poland and Lithuania in 1569, the city continued to enjoy a large degree of internal autonomy (cf. Danzig law). Being the largest and one of the most influential cities of Poland, it enjoyed voting rights during the royal election period in Poland.

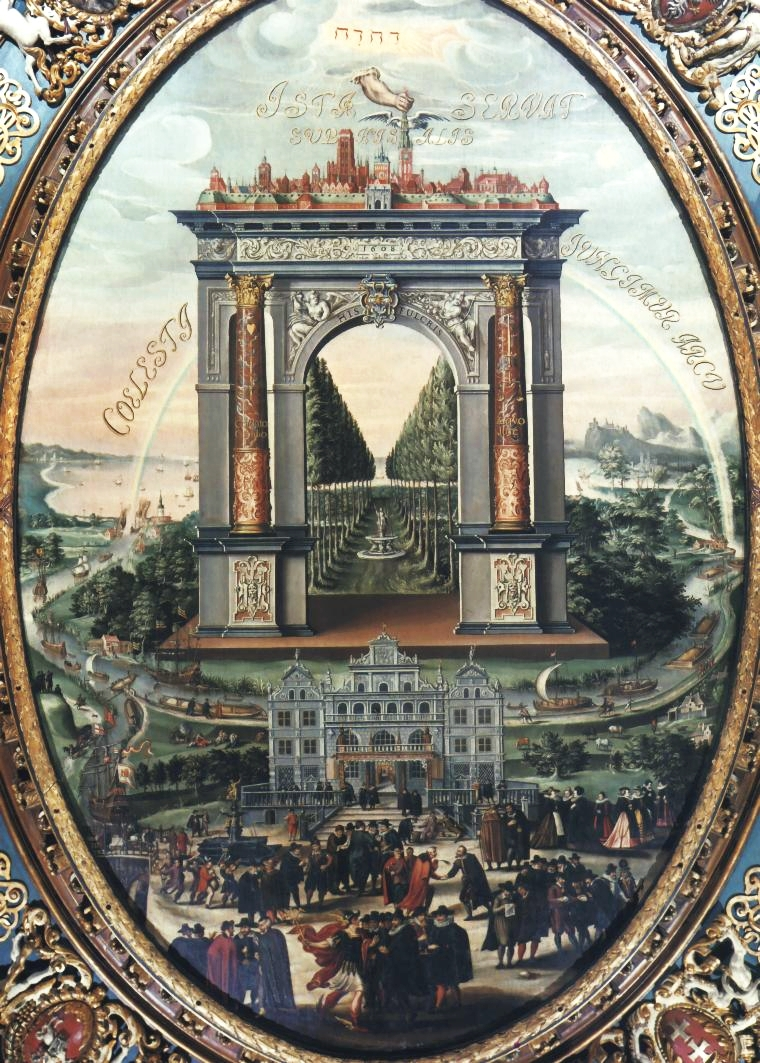
Apotheosis of Gdańsk by Isaak van den Blocke. The Vistula-borne trade of goods in Poland was the main source of prosperity during the city's Golden Age.

In the 1560s and 1570s, a large Mennonite community started growing in the city, gaining significant popularity. In the 1575 election to the Polish throne, Danzig supported Maximilian II in his struggle against Stephen Báthory. It was the latter who eventually became monarch, but the city, encouraged by the secret support of Denmark and Emperor Maximilian, shut its gates against Stephen. After the Siege of Danzig, lasting six months, the city's army of 5,000 mercenaries was utterly defeated in a field battle on 16 December 1577. However, since Stephen's armies were unable to take the city by force, a compromise was reached: Stephen Báthory confirmed the city's special status and its Danzig law privileges granted by earlier Polish kings. The city recognised him as ruler of Poland and paid the large sum of 200,000 guldens in gold as an apology.

During the Polish–Swedish War of 1626–1629, in 1627, the naval Battle of Oliwa was fought near the city, and it is one of the greatest victories in the history of the Polish Navy. During the Swedish invasion of Poland of 1655–1660, commonly known as the Deluge, the city was unsuccessfully besieged by Sweden. In 1660, the war was ended with the Treaty of Oliwa, signed in the present-day district of Oliwa. In 1677, a Polish-Swedish alliance was signed in the city. Around 1640, Johannes Hevelius established his astronomical observatory in the Old Town. King John III Sobieski regularly visited Hevelius.

Beside a majority of German-speakers, whose elites sometimes distinguished their German dialect as Pomerelian, the city was home to a Polish minority. In 1632, the Gdańsk Bible was first published, which was a Polish language translation of holy scriptures that became the Bible of all Evangelical Poles. Polish influence increased slightly with Danzig’s integration into Poland, but the city retained a pronounced German linguistic and cultural character, a circumstance attributable above all to the ongoing influx of predominantly Protestant settlers, primarily of Dutch, Scottish and German origin, who assimilated into the local German culture. The Scots took refuge or migrated to and received citizenship in the city, with first Scots arriving in 1380, and a French Huguenot commune was founded in 1686. Due to the special status of the city and significance within the Polish–Lithuanian Commonwealth, the city inhabitants largely became bi-cultural sharing both German and Polish culture and were strongly attached to the traditions of the Commonwealth.

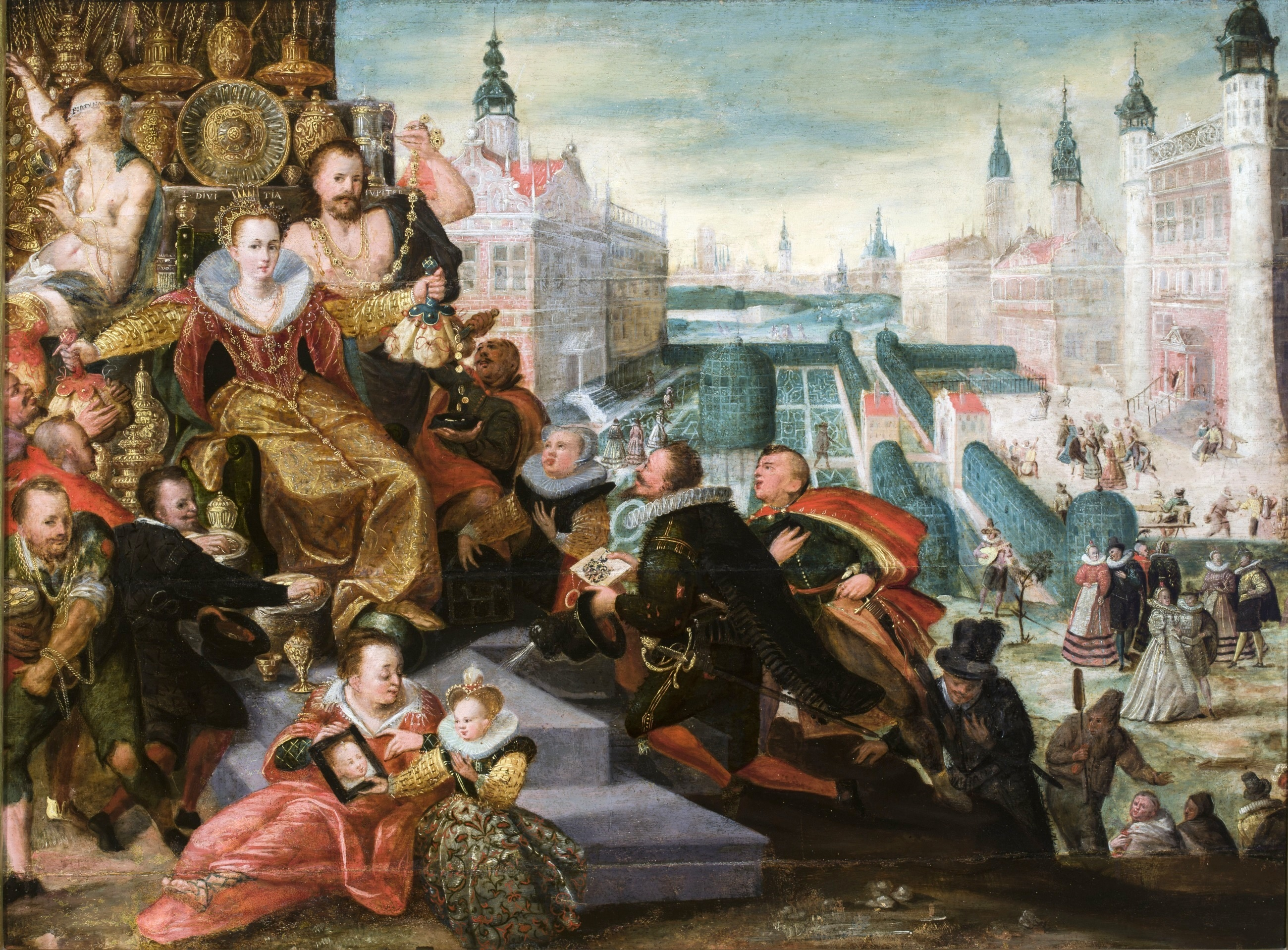
An allegorical portrayal of wealth from 1604. The foreground features affluent citizens and the background presents the hyperbolized city with its landmarks, notably the Torture Tower and the Main City Hall.

The city suffered a last great plague and a slow economic decline due to the wars of the 18th century. After peace was restored in 1721, Danzig experienced steady economic recovery. As a stronghold of Stanisław Leszczyński's supporters during the War of the Polish Succession, it was taken by the Russians after the Siege of Danzig in 1734. In the 1740s and 1750s Danzig was restored and the Danzig port was again the most significant grain exporting port in the Baltic region. The Danzig Research Society, which became defunct in 1936, was founded in 1743.

In 1772, the First Partition of Poland took place and Prussia annexed almost all of the former Royal Prussia, which became the Province of West Prussia. However, Danzig remained a part of Poland as an exclave separated from the rest of the country. The Prussian king cut off the city with a military controlled barrier, also blocking shipping links to foreign ports, on the pretence that a cattle plague may otherwise break out. Danzig declined in its economic significance and lost commercial shares to Elbing, which had come under Prussian control in 1772. However, by the end of the 18th century, Danzig was still one of the most economically integrated cities in Poland. It was well-connected and traded actively with German cities, while other Polish cities became less well-integrated towards the end of the century, mostly due to greater risks for long-distance trade, given the number of violent conflicts along the trade routes.

=== Kingdom of Prussia, Napoleonic Free City and Germany ===
Danzig was annexed by the Kingdom of Prussia in 1793 in the Second Partition of Poland. The population largely opposed the Prussian annexation and wanted the city to remain part of the Kingdom of Poland. The mayor of the city stepped down from his office due to the annexation. The notable city councilor Johann Uphagen also resigned as a sign of protest against the annexation.

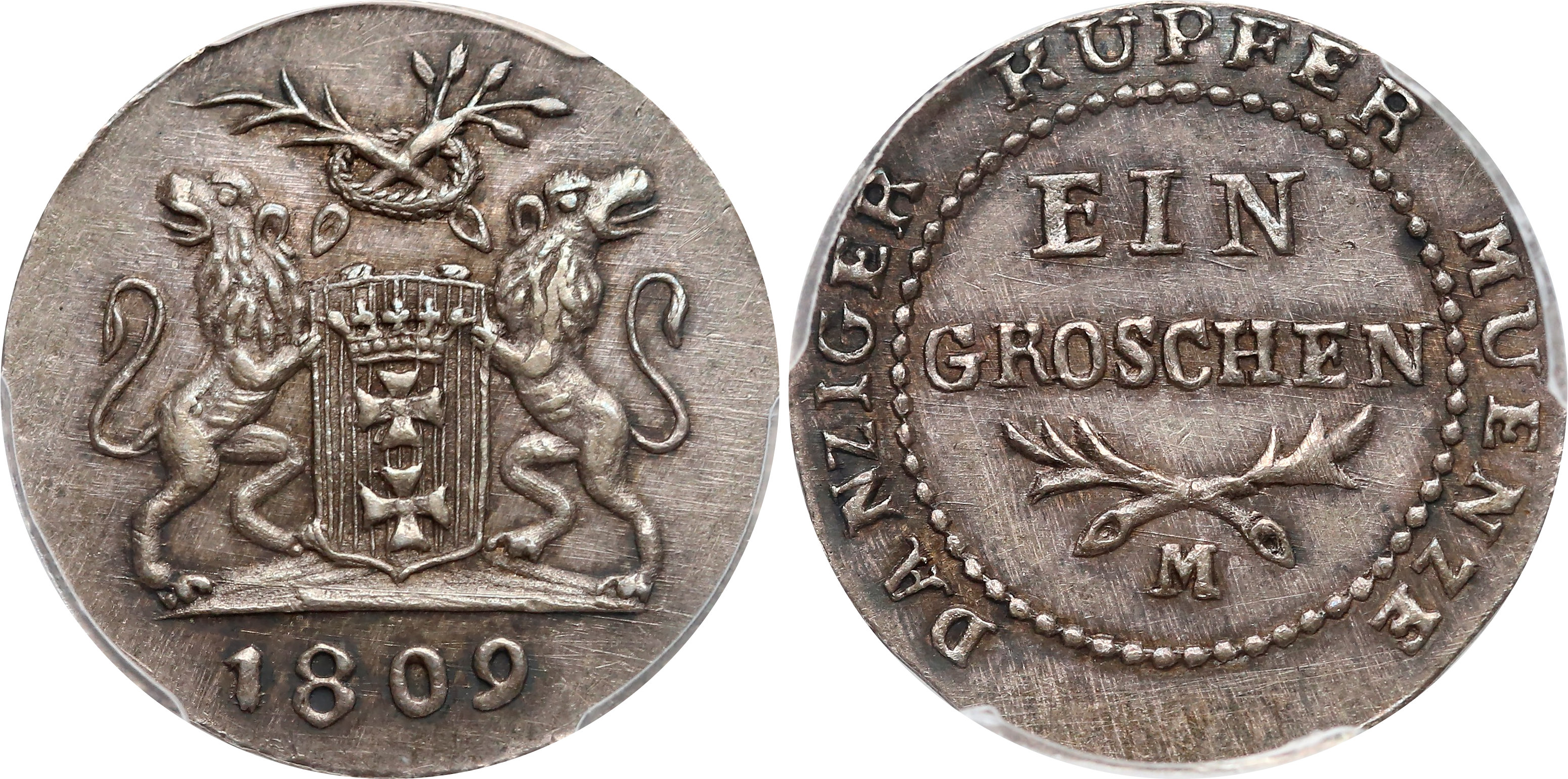
Independent currency (groschen coins) minted in the Free City of Danzig after Napoleon's entry in the aftermath of the Franco-Polish 1807 siege.

Danzig’s integration into the Prussian kingdom soon fostered its economic revival. The city regained its significance as a Baltic port, though trade patterns shifted increasingly towards the British market. It also benefited from its integration into the Prussian customs territory, which had been expanded considerably since the Second Partition of Poland, and new postal links to Berlin, Königsberg, and Warsaw, which facilitated communication.

During the Napoleonic Wars in 1807, the city was besieged and captured by a coalition of French, Polish, Italian, Saxon, and Baden forces. It then became the Free City of Danzig, a client state of the French Empire, which it remained until 1814, when it was captured by combined Prussian-Russian forces. In 1815, after France's defeat in the Napoleonic Wars, the city was restored to Prussia and became the capital of Regierungsbezirk Danzig within the province of West Prussia.

Beginning in the 1820s, the Wisłoujście Fortress served as a prison, mainly for Polish political prisoners, including resistance members, protesters, insurgents of the November and January uprisings and refugees from the Russian Partition of Poland fleeing conscription into the Russian Army, and insurgents of the November Uprising were also imprisoned in Biskupia Górka (Bischofsberg). From May to June 1832 and in November 1833, more than 1,000 Polish insurgents departed partitioned Poland through the city's port, boarding ships bound for France, the United Kingdom and the United States (see Great Emigration). The population in 1843 was 62,000 inhabitants.

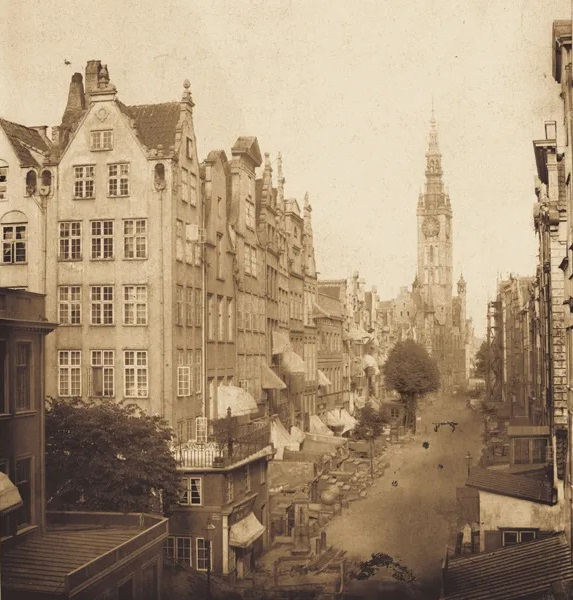
An early photograph of Langgasse, present-day Długa Street, 1855

The city's longest serving mayor was Robert von Blumenthal, who held office from 1841, through the revolutions of 1848, until 1863. In the second half of the 19th century, Danzig experienced railway construction, port expansion, and the growth of industries such as shipbuilding, timber processing, and food production. Nevertheless, its industrial development lagged behind that of other major Prussian cities. In 1871, Danzig became the first city in Continental Europe to establish a sewer system with wastewater treatment, resulting in a significant improvement in public health.

With the unification of Germany under Prussian hegemony in 1871, the city became part of the German Empire and remained so until 1919, after Germany's defeat in World War I. Starting from the 1850s, long-established Danzig families often felt marginalized by the new town elite originating from mainland Germany. This situation caused the Polish to allege that the Danzig people were oppressed by German rule and for this reason allegedly failed to articulate their natural desire for strong ties with Poland.

=== Free City of Danzig and World War II ===
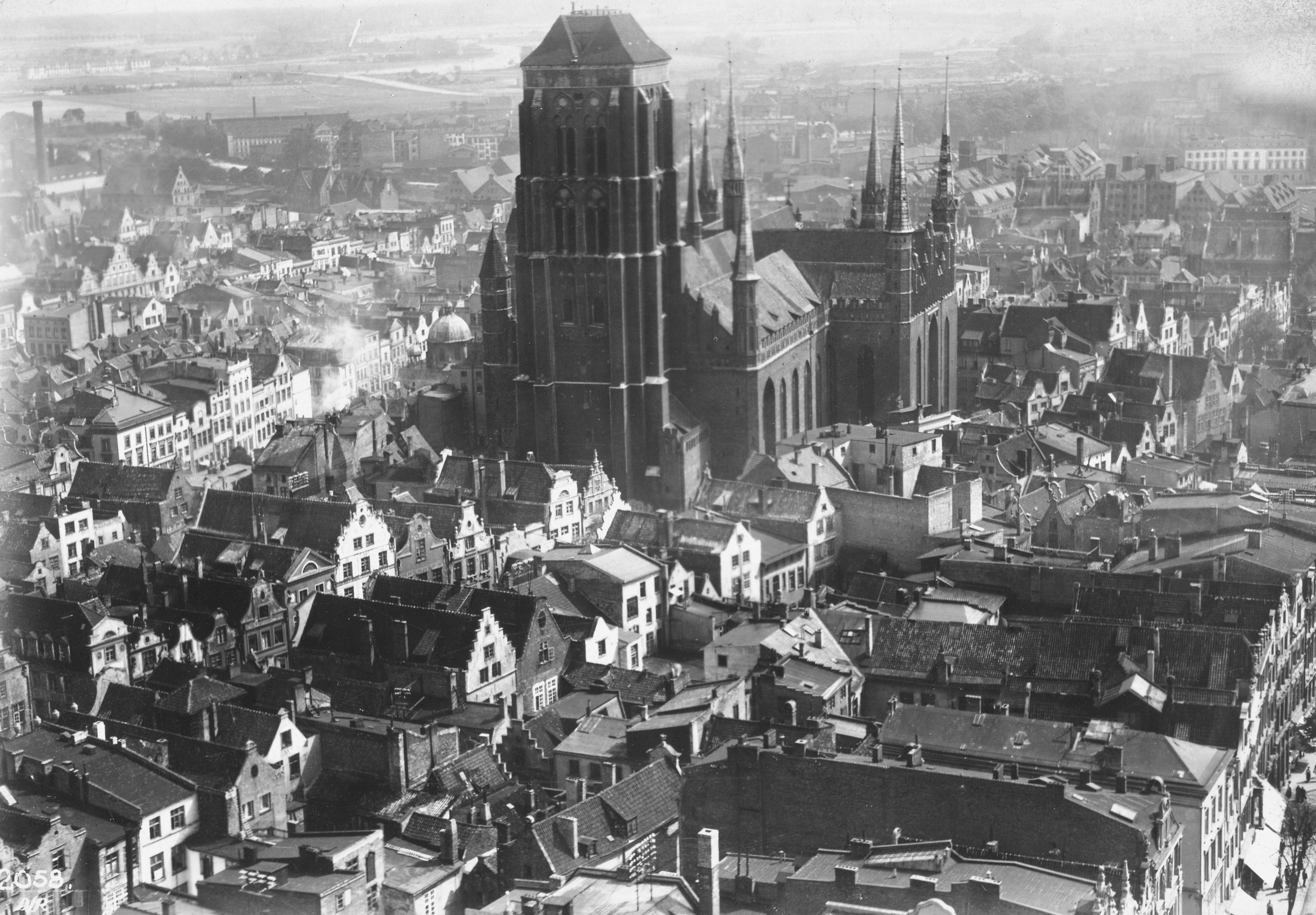
An aerial view of the historic city centre around 1920

When Poland regained its independence after World War I with access to the sea as promised by the Allies on the basis of Woodrow Wilson's "Fourteen Points", the Poles hoped the city's harbour would also become part of Poland. However, in the end – since Germans formed a majority in the city, with Poles being a minority – the city was not placed under Polish sovereignty.

Instead, in accordance with the terms of the Treaty of Versailles, it became the Free City of Danzig, an independent state under the auspices of the League of Nations with its external affairs largely under Polish control. Poland's rights also included free use of the harbour, a Polish post office, a Polish garrison in Westerplatte district, and a customs union with Poland. The Free City had its own constitution, national anthem, parliament, and government. It issued its own stamps and currency, the latter being called the Danzig gulden.

With the growth of Nazism among Germans, anti-Polish sentiment became far more common among local Germans; public Polish-language schools were heavily restricted, causing its Polish inhabitants to found their own private schools. In the 1930s, the local branch of the Nazi Party under Albert Forster, a Schutzstaffel member, capitalized on the sentiments of the city's German population to win the next elections to the city's legislature, triggering a wave of repression. The Danzig city government implemented various discriminatory policies against Poles, including expelling Polish students from the technical university, forcibly Germanizing dozens of Polish surnames, removing landmarks that reminded of Polish rule such as the Artus Court and Neptune's Fountain from the heritage list, prohibiting employment of Poles by German companies, and banning the use of Polish in public places.

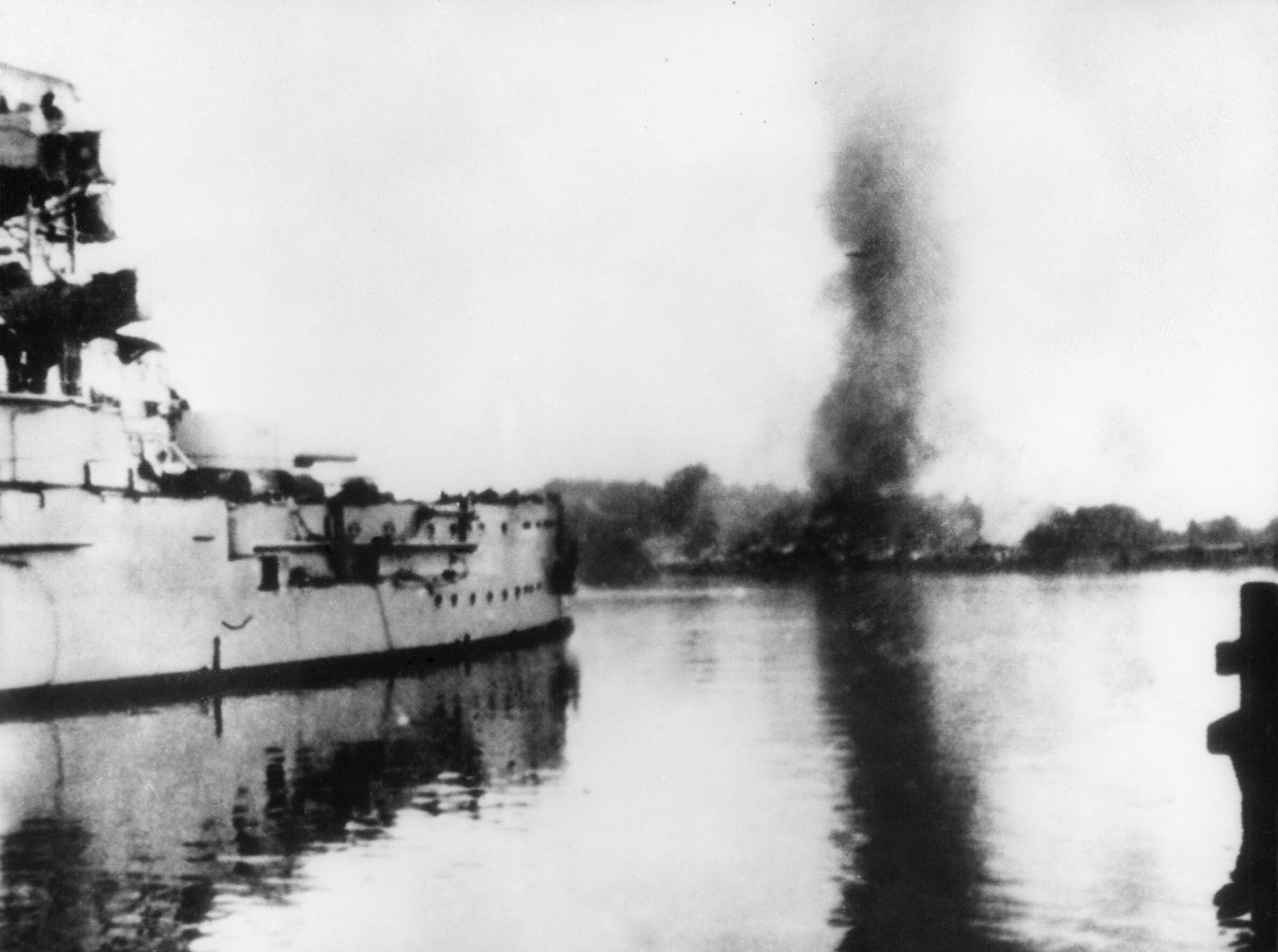
The German battleship SMS Schleswig-Holstein firing at the Polish Military Transit Depot in Westerplatte during the Battle of Westerplatte in September 1939

Attacks and discrimination also came from the citizens of Danzig themselves, who often attacked Polish schools and the youth that attended them and were disallowed from entering various businesses owned by Germans. Polish railwaymen were also subjects of beatings. Many ethnic Poles were tracked by the Gestapo and, in Operation Tannenberg, arrested and moved to camps such as Stutthof or executed in the Piaśnica forest.

Nazi Germany officially demanded the return of Danzig to Germany along with a German-controlled highway through the area of the Polish Corridor, pursuing a far more aggressive policy in this matter than it had regarding the Sudetenland with Czechoslovakia in 1938. With Poland's refusal, German–Polish relations deteriorated, ultimately concluding with the beginning of the invasion of Poland on 1 September 1939. Some of the earliest combat of World War II occurred in Danzig. At 04:45 a.m. on 1 September, the Battle of Westerplatte began with the SMS Schleswig-Holstein firing the war's first shots on a Polish military depot there, whilst a small group of men defended the Polish post office in the city for several hours. The defenders were later executed.

Within one year of a 1937 pogrom, more than half of the city's Jewish community had left, and organized emigration of Jews away from Danzig began after the Kristallnacht riots in 1938. In 1939, regular transports to Mandatory Palestine began. The numbers of the local Jewish community quickly thinned, with only 600 Jews remaining in Danzig by 1941. Many of the Jews who remained were transported to the small, single-building Danzig Ghetto.

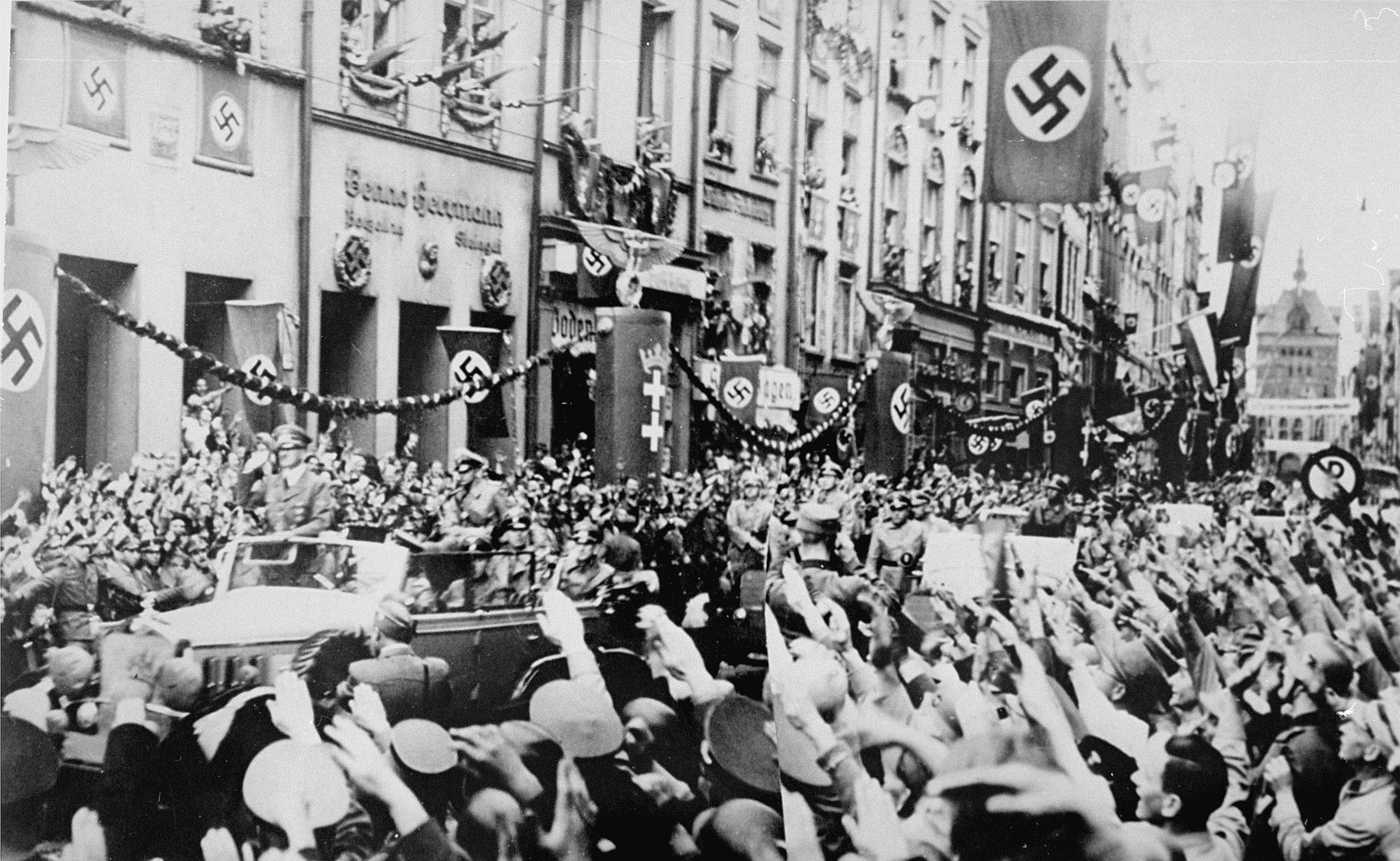
Crowds greet Adolf Hitler as he rides in an open car in Danzig in September 1939.

During the war, Germany operated a prison in the city, an Einsatzgruppen-operated penal camp, a Zigeunerlager ("Gypsy camp") for Romani people, two subcamps of the Stalag XX-B prisoner-of-war camp for Allied POWs, and several subcamps of the Stutthof concentration camp within the present-day city limits. In 1945, as the Red Army neared the area, thousands of civilians fled the city during Operation Hannibal aboard ships such as Wilhelm Gustloff. It endured heavy Allied and Soviet air raids during the war. Danzig was captured by Polish and Soviet troops in March 1945. The city was heavily damaged as a result. Soviet soldiers committed large-scale rape and looting, especially of the industrial areas.

In line with the decisions made by the Allies under pressure of Stalin at the Yalta and Potsdam conferences, the city was annexed by Poland, although with a Soviet-installed communist regime, which stayed in power until the fall of communism in Poland in the late 1980s and early 1990s. In June 1945 around 124,000 Germans remained in the city. Shortly afterward, in July 1945, the Polish authorities began deporting the Germans to Allied-occupied Germany. The city was repopulated by ethnic Poles; up to 18% of them had been deported by the Soviets in two major waves from pre-war eastern Polish areas annexed by the Soviet Union.

=== Post-World War II (1945–1989) ===
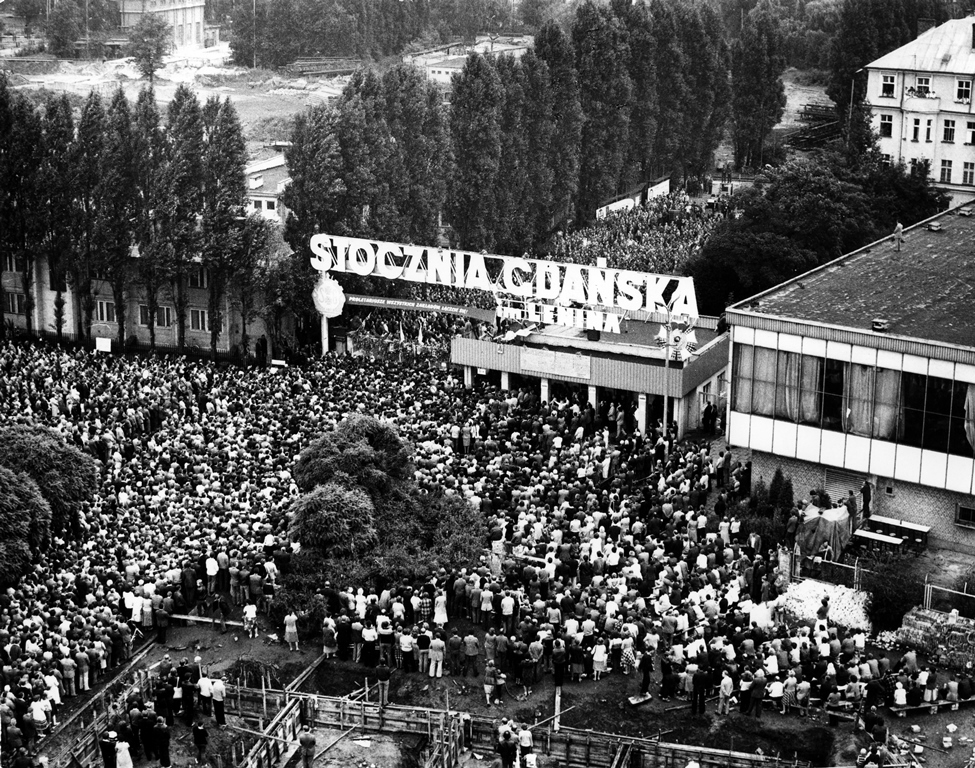
Solidarity (Solidarność) strikes at the Gdańsk Shipyard in 1980

Parts of the historic old city of Gdańsk, which had suffered large-scale destruction during the war, were rebuilt during the 1950s and 1960s. The reconstruction sought to dilute the "German character" of the city, and set it back to how it supposedly looked like before the annexation to Prussia in 1793. Nineteenth-century transformations were ignored as "ideologically malignant" by post-war administrations, or regarded as "Prussian barbarism" worthy of demolition, while Flemish/Dutch, Italian and French influences were emphasized in order to "neutralize" the German influence on the appearance of the city.

Boosted by heavy investment in the development of its port and shipyards fuelled by Soviet ambitions in the Baltic region, Gdańsk became the major shipping and industrial centre of the People's Republic of Poland. In December 1970, Gdańsk was the location of anti-regime demonstrations, which led to the downfall of Poland's communist leader Władysław Gomułka. During the demonstrations in Gdańsk and Gdynia, military and police forces opened fire on the demonstrators, causing several dozen deaths. Ten years later, in August 1980, Gdańsk Shipyard was the birthplace of the Solidarity trade union and political movement.

In September 1981, to deter Solidarity, Soviet Union launched Exercise Zapad-81, the largest military exercise in history, during which amphibious landings were conducted near Gdańsk. Around the same time, Solidarity's first national congress was hosted in the Hala Olivia, located in Gdańsk. Its opposition to the Communist regime led to the end of communist rule in 1989, and sparked a series of protests that overthrew the communist regimes of the former Eastern Bloc.

=== Contemporary history (1990–present) ===
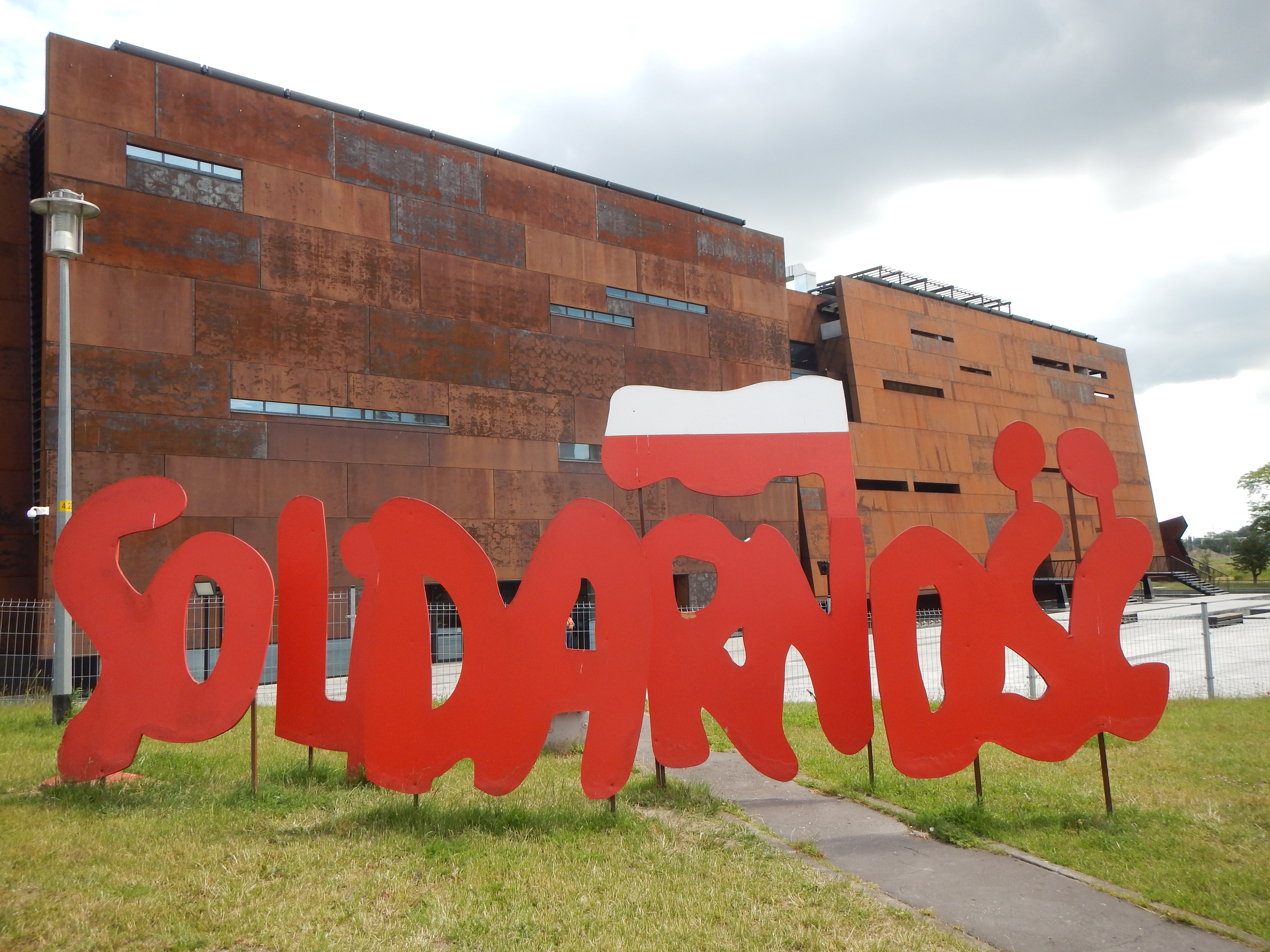
The European Solidarity Centre houses exhibits documenting the history of the Solidarity trade union and the anti-communist resistance movement in Poland.

Solidarity's leader, Lech Wałęsa, became President of Poland in 1990. In 2014 the European Solidarity Centre, a museum and library devoted to the history of the movement, opened in Gdańsk. On 9 July 2001, the city experienced a flood, with 200 million zł being estimated in damage, 4 people being killed, and 304 being evacuated. As a result, the city has since built more than fifty reservoirs, the number of which is rising. Donald Tusk, a Gdańsk native, has been prime minister of Poland since 2023, and also filled the role from 2007 to 2014. He was additionally President of the European Council from 2014 to 2019.

In January 2019, the Mayor of Gdańsk, Paweł Adamowicz, was assassinated by a man who had just been released from prison for violent crimes. After stabbing the mayor in the abdomen near the heart, the man claimed that the mayor's political party had been responsible for imprisoning him. Though Adamowicz underwent a multi-hour surgery, he died the next day.

In October 2019, the city of Gdańsk was awarded the Princess of Asturias Award in the Concord category as a recognition of the fact that "the past and present in Gdańsk are sensitive to solidarity, the defense of freedom and human rights, as well as to the preservation of peace". In a 2023 Report on the Quality of Life in European Cities compiled by the European Commission, Gdańsk was named as the fourth best city to live in Europe alongside Leipzig, Stockholm and Geneva.

== Geography ==
Gdańsk is divided into two main parts, known as the Górny Taras and Dolny Taras in Polish; the low-lying Dolny Taras (Lower Terrace) is found on the Baltic coast, covering parts of the Vistula Fens, whereas the Górny Taras (Upper Terrace) is characterised by uneven highlands and is part of the Kashubian Lake District. The city is also found at the mouth of the Motława and Vistula rivers, which has significantly influenced its geography and shaped its economy.

=== Climate ===
Gdańsk

Climate chart (precipitation, max. and min. temperature)
J	F	M	A	M	J	J	A	S	O	N	D
29 1 −4	23 2 −3	28 6 −1	31 11 3	55 17 8	68 20 11	68 23 14	69 23 13	64 18 10	49 13 6	46 6 1	39 3 −2
- █ Average max. and min. temperatures in °C
- █ Precipitation totals in mm
- Source: World Meteorological Organisation
Imperial conversion
J	F	M	A	M	J	J	A	S	O	N	D
1.1 35 25	0.9 36 26	1.1 43 31	1.2 53 38	2.2 62 46	2.7 67 52	2.7 73 56	2.7 73 56	2.5 64 50	1.9 55 42	1.8 43 34	1.5 37 28
- █ Average max. and min. temperatures in °F
- █ Precipitation totals in inches

Gdańsk has a climate with both oceanic and continental influences. According to some categorisations, it has an oceanic climate (Cfb), while others classify it as belonging to the humid continental climate (Dfb). It actually depends on whether the mean reference temperature for the coldest winter month is set at −3 °C (27 °F) or 0 °C (32 °F). Gdańsk's dry winters and the precipitation maximum in summer are indicators of continentality. However seasonal extremes are less pronounced than those in inland Poland.

The city has moderately cold and cloudy winters, with mean temperatures in January and February near or below 0 °C (32 °F) and mild summers with frequent showers and thunderstorms. Average temperatures range from −1.0 to 17.2 °C (30 to 63 °F) and average monthly rainfall varies 17.9 to 66.7 mm (1 to 3 in) per month with a rather low annual total of 507.3 mm (20 in). In general, the weather is damp, variable, and mild.

The seasons are clearly differentiated. Spring starts in March and is initially cold and windy, later becoming pleasantly warm and often increasingly sunny. Summer, which begins in June, is predominantly warm but hot at times with temperature reaching as high as 30 to 35 °C (86 to 95 °F) at least couple times a year with plenty of sunshine interspersed with heavy rain. Gdańsk averages 1,700 hours of sunshine per year. July and August are the warmest months. Autumn comes in September and is at first warm and usually sunny, turning cold, damp, and foggy in November. Winter lasts from December to March and includes periods of snow. January and February are the coldest months with the temperature sometimes dropping as low as −15 °C (5 °F).

Climate data for Gdańsk (1991–2020)
Month	Jan	Feb	Mar	Apr	May	Jun	Jul	Aug	Sep	Oct	Nov	Dec	Year
Record high °C (°F)	15.5 (59.9)	18.1 (64.6)	24.5 (76.1)	30.6 (87.1)	32.3 (90.1)	34.7 (94.5)	36.0 (96.8)	35.8 (96.4)	31.7 (89.1)	28.1 (82.6)	21.1 (70.0)	13.7 (56.7)	36.0 (96.8)
Mean maximum °C (°F)	7.6 (45.7)	8.4 (47.1)	14.9 (58.8)	22.1 (71.8)	25.9 (78.6)	28.9 (84.0)	30.0 (86.0)	29.9 (85.8)	24.8 (76.6)	19.2 (66.6)	11.8 (53.2)	8.4 (47.1)	31.8 (89.2)
Mean daily maximum °C (°F)	1.7 (35.1)	2.9 (37.2)	6.6 (43.9)	12.1 (53.8)	16.8 (62.2)	20.4 (68.7)	22.6 (72.7)	22.9 (73.2)	18.5 (65.3)	12.7 (54.9)	6.7 (44.1)	3.1 (37.6)	12.3 (54.1)
Daily mean °C (°F)	−1.4 (29.5)	−0.8 (30.6)	1.8 (35.2)	6.9 (44.4)	11.9 (53.4)	15.5 (59.9)	17.7 (63.9)	17.3 (63.1)	12.9 (55.2)	8.0 (46.4)	3.4 (38.1)	0.1 (32.2)	7.7 (45.9)
Mean daily minimum °C (°F)	−3.3 (26.1)	−2.7 (27.1)	−0.4 (31.3)	3.6 (38.5)	8.1 (46.6)	11.6 (52.9)	14.2 (57.6)	13.9 (57.0)	10.4 (50.7)	5.8 (42.4)	1.9 (35.4)	−1.6 (29.1)	5.1 (41.2)
Mean minimum °C (°F)	−15.6 (3.9)	−13.5 (7.7)	−9.7 (14.5)	−3.8 (25.2)	0.0 (32.0)	4.3 (39.7)	7.5 (45.5)	7.2 (45.0)	3.0 (37.4)	−2.2 (28.0)	−6.3 (20.7)	−11.3 (11.7)	−19.1 (−2.4)
Record low °C (°F)	−27.4 (−17.3)	−29.8 (−21.6)	−22.8 (−9.0)	−7.7 (18.1)	−4.3 (24.3)	−0.5 (31.1)	2.1 (35.8)	4.4 (39.9)	−1.9 (28.6)	−7.0 (19.4)	−16.9 (1.6)	−23.3 (−9.9)	−29.8 (−21.6)
Average precipitation mm (inches)	28.5 (1.12)	23.7 (0.93)	27.5 (1.08)	32.0 (1.26)	53.3 (2.10)	58.8 (2.31)	79.4 (3.13)	70.0 (2.76)	64.5 (2.54)	54.8 (2.16)	42.6 (1.68)	36.0 (1.42)	571.0 (22.48)
Average precipitation days (≥ 0.1 mm)	16.67	14.25	14.03	11.43	13.07	14.03	13.43	14.03	12.40	15.27	15.93	17.97	172.51
Average relative humidity (%)	87.7	85.9	82.5	75.5	71.6	72.2	74.7	78.1	82.6	84.6	89.1	89.8	81.2
Average dew point °C (°F)	−3 (27)	−3 (27)	−1 (30)	2 (36)	6 (43)	10 (50)	13 (55)	12 (54)	9 (48)	6 (43)	2 (36)	−1 (30)	4 (40)
Mean monthly sunshine hours	39	70	134	163	244	259	236	225	174	105	45	32	1,726
Average ultraviolet index	1	2	2	4	4	5	5	4	4	3	1	1	3
Source 1: Institute of Meteorology and Water Management
Source 2: meteomodel.pl, (Note: Record temperatures are from all Gdańsk stations.) Weather Atlas (UV), Time and Date (dewpoints, 2005–2015)

== Economy ==
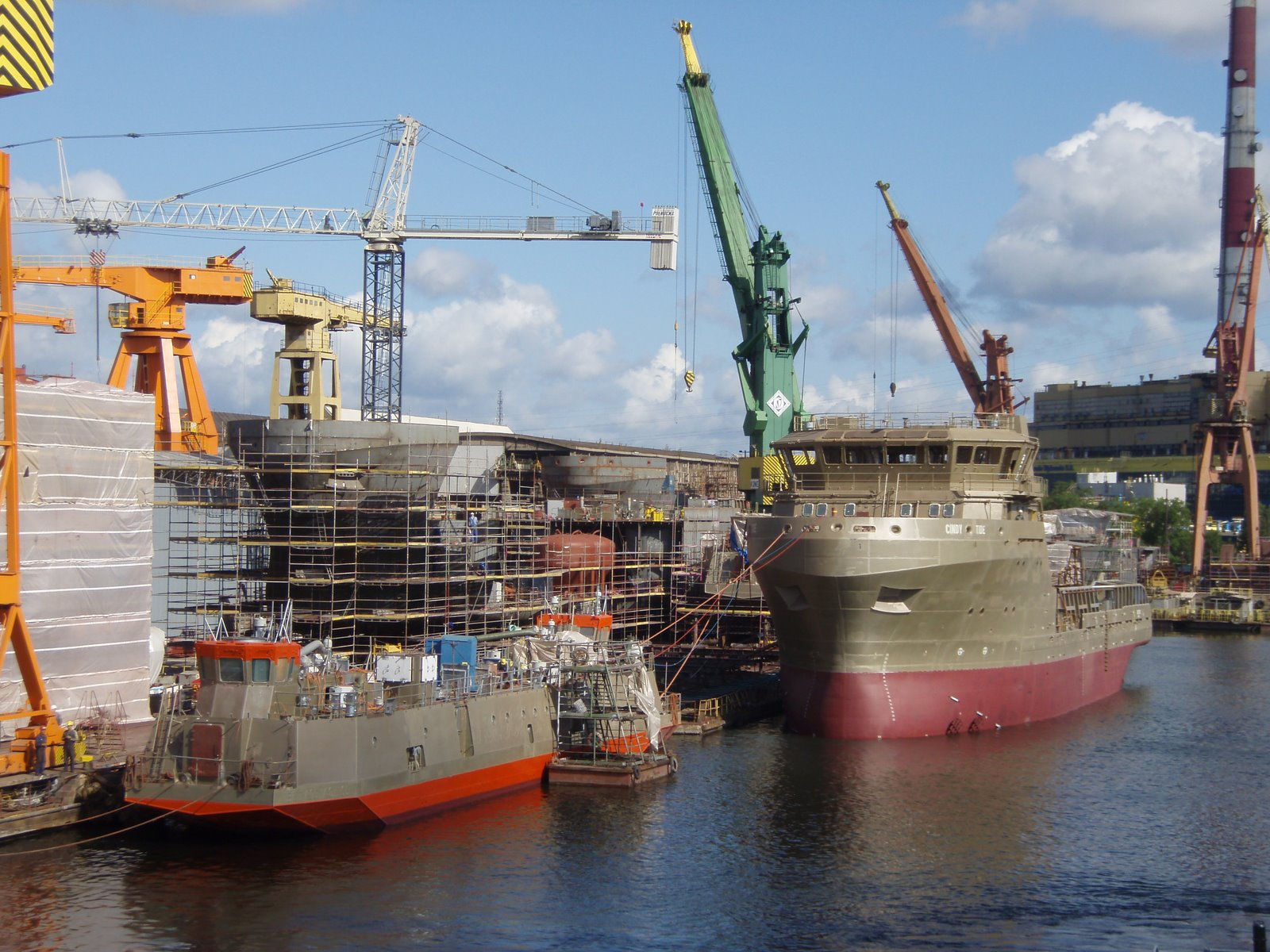
Gdańsk Shipyard

The industrial sections of the city are dominated by shipbuilding, petrochemical, and chemical industries, as well as food processing. The share of high-tech sectors such as electronics, telecommunications, IT engineering, cosmetics, and pharmaceuticals is on the rise. Amber processing is also an important part of the local economy, as the majority of the world's amber deposits lie along the Baltic coast.

Major companies based in Gdańsk include the multinational clothing company LPP, the energy company Energa, the shipyard Remontowa, the Gdańsk Shipyard, and Ziaja. The city also served as a major base for Grupa Lotos, with the Gdańsk Refinery being the second-largest in Poland, with a capacity of 33,000 m^{3}/d (210,000 bbl/d). Gdańsk also hosts the biennial BALTEXPO International Maritime Fair and Conference, the largest fair dedicated to the maritime industry in Poland.

The largest shopping centre located in the city is Forum Gdańsk, which covers a large plot in the city centre. In 2021, the registered unemployment rate in the city was estimated at 3.6%.

== Main sights ==
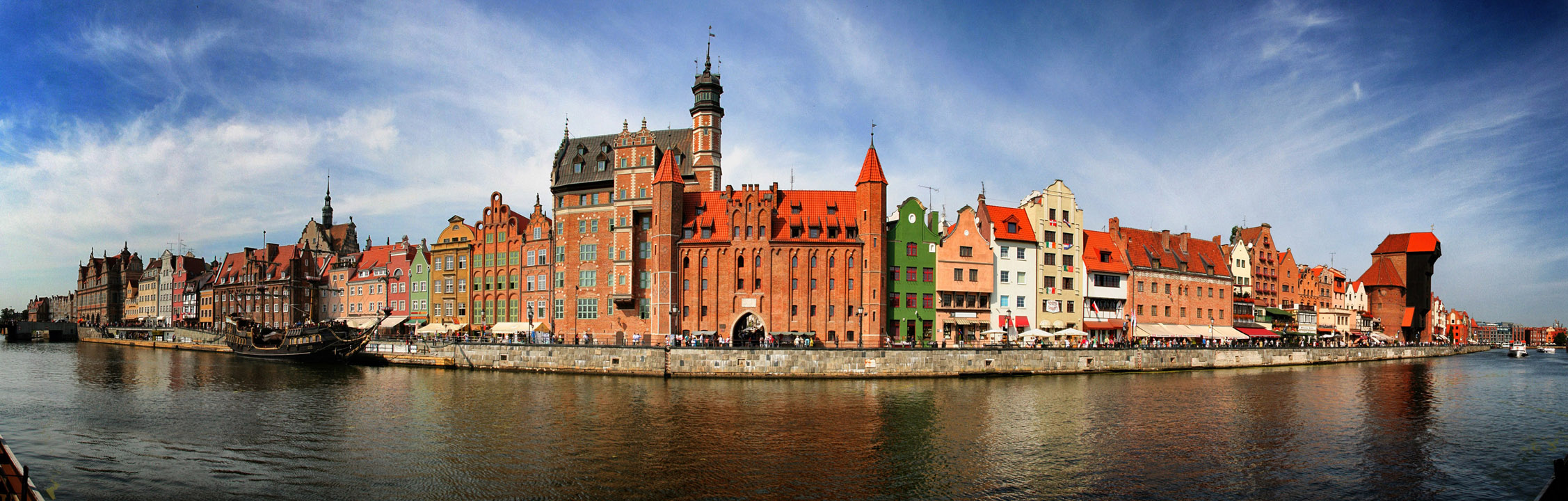
View of Gdańsk's Main Town from the Motława River (2012)

=== Architecture ===
Sights along the Royal Route

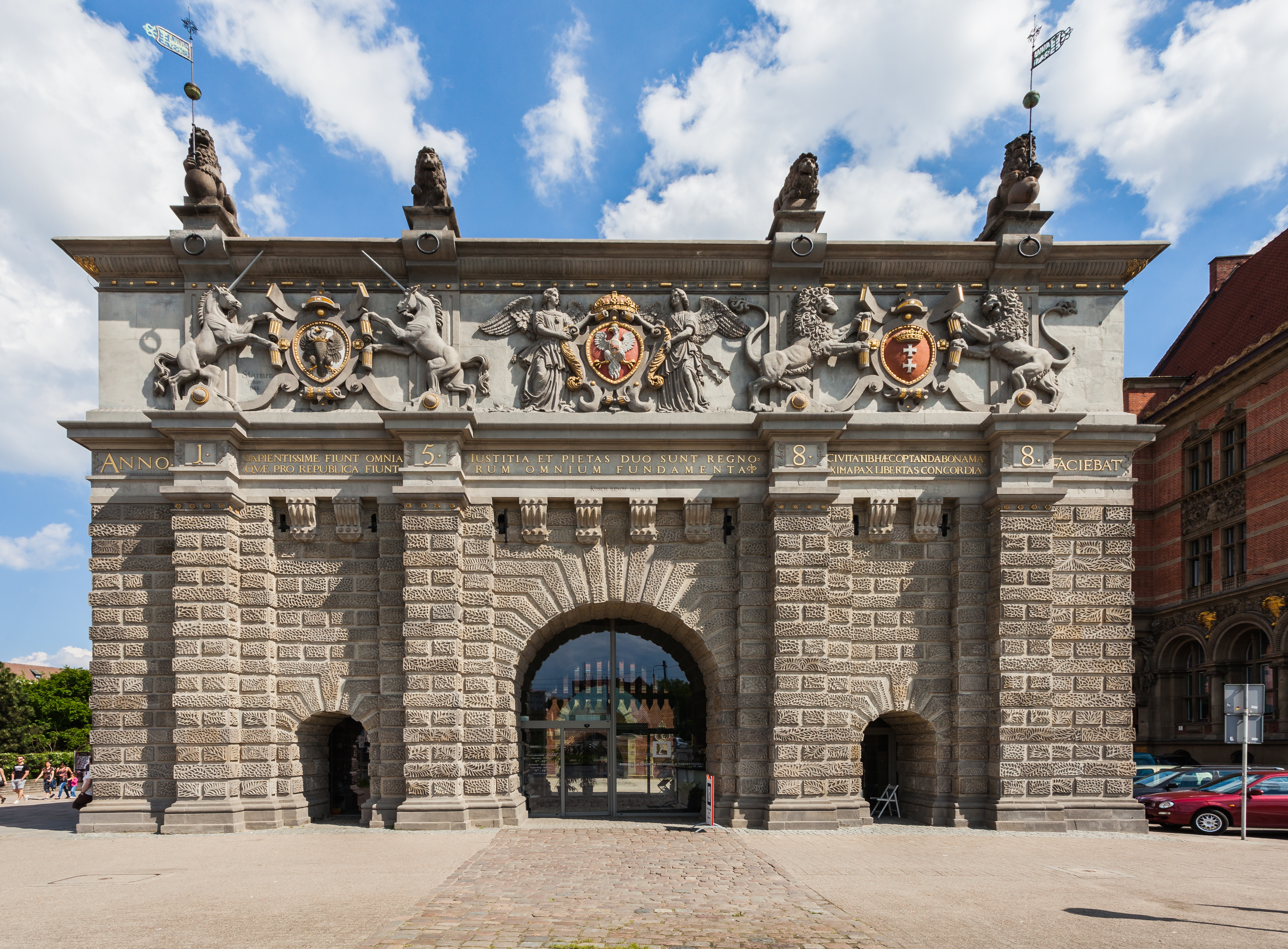
Highland Gate

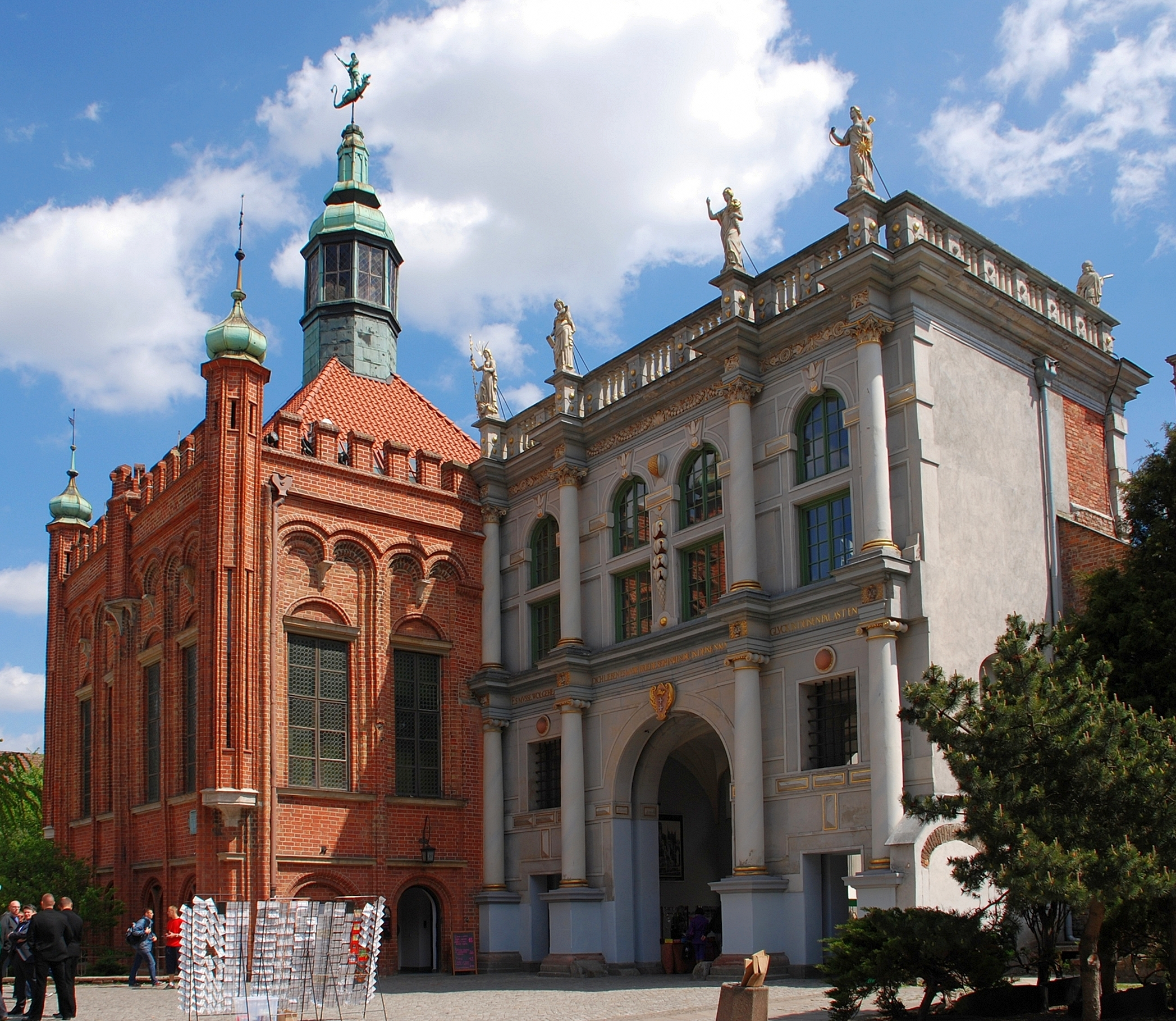
Golden Gate

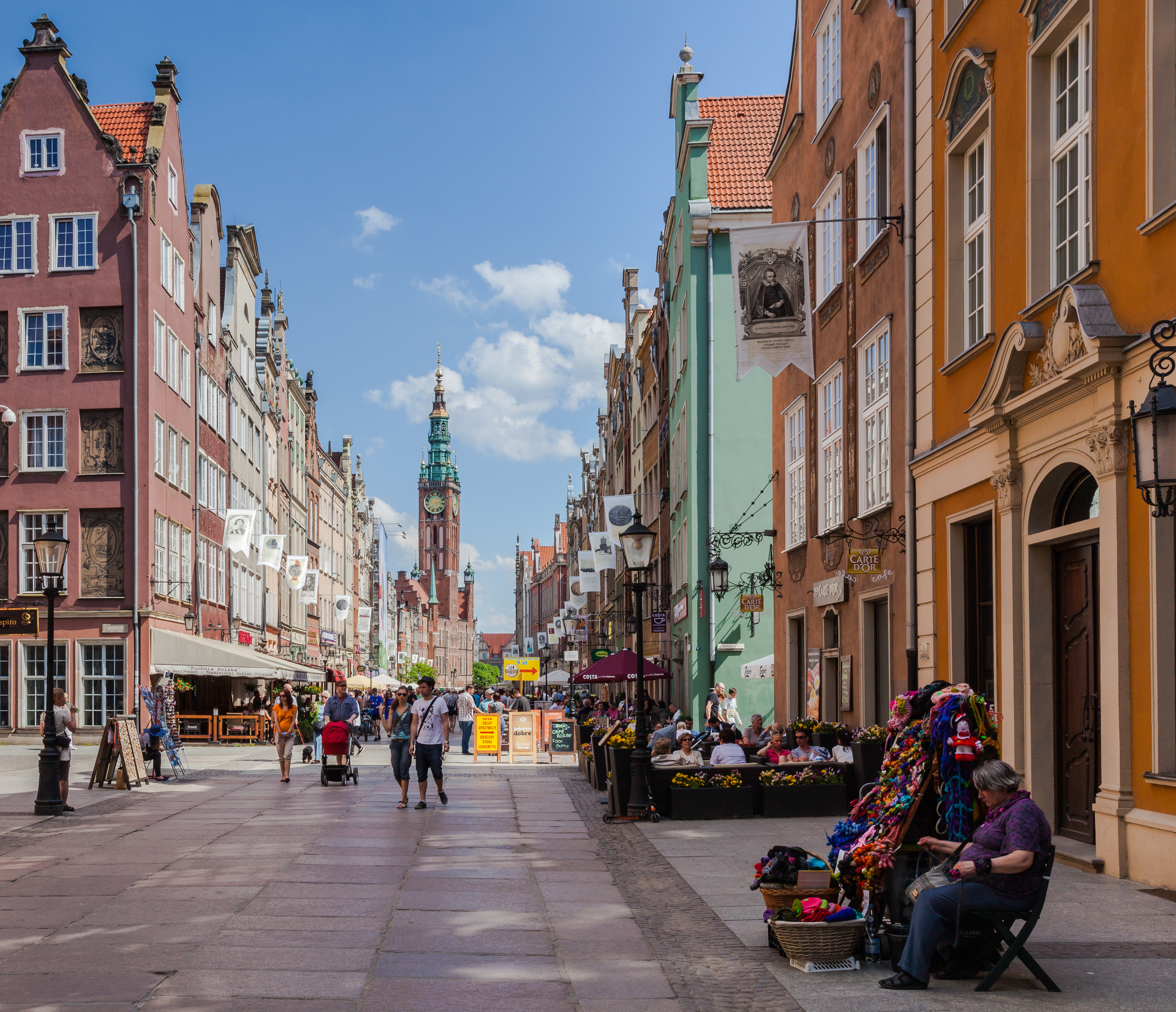
Ulica Długa (Long Lane)

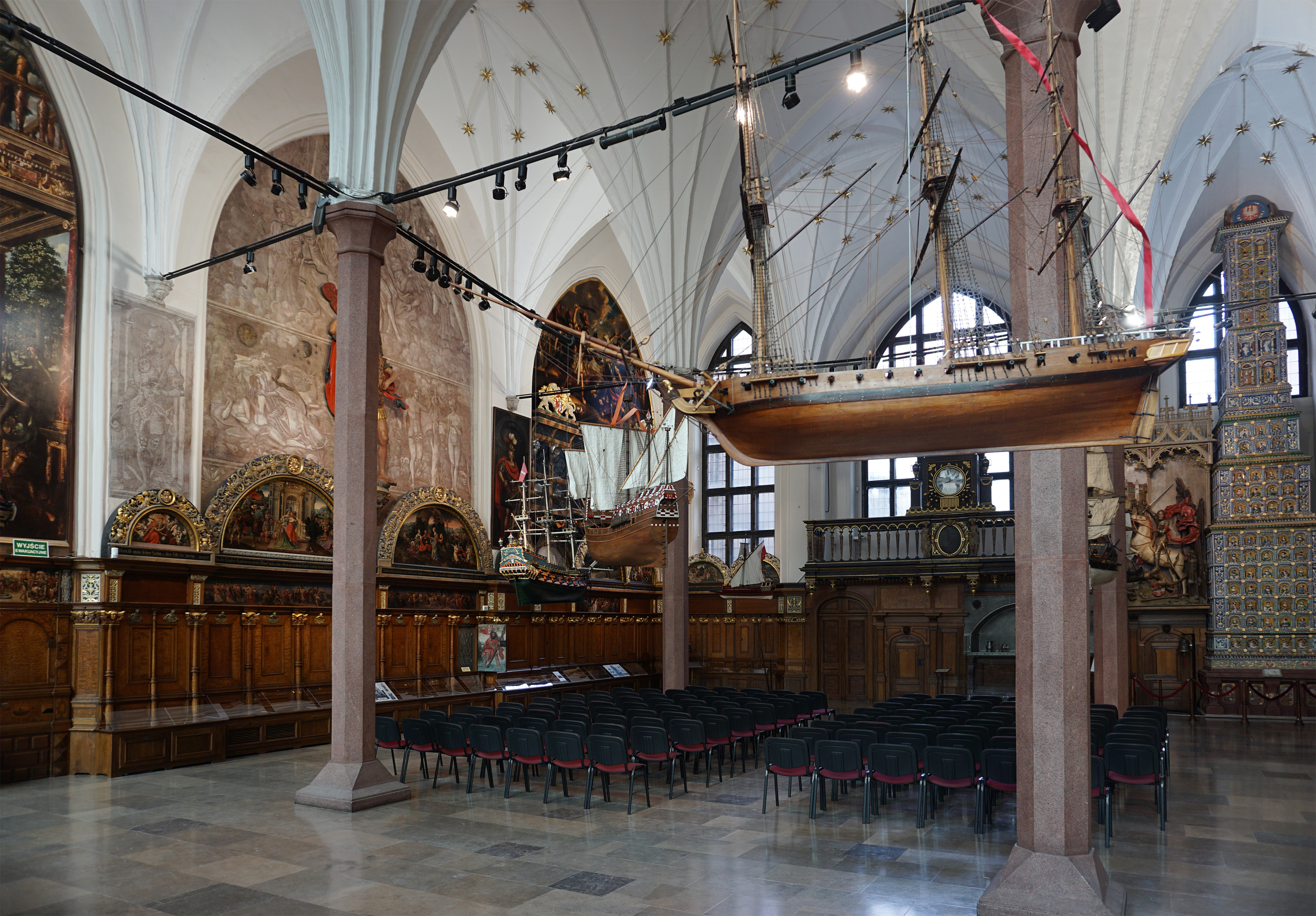
Interior of Artus Court

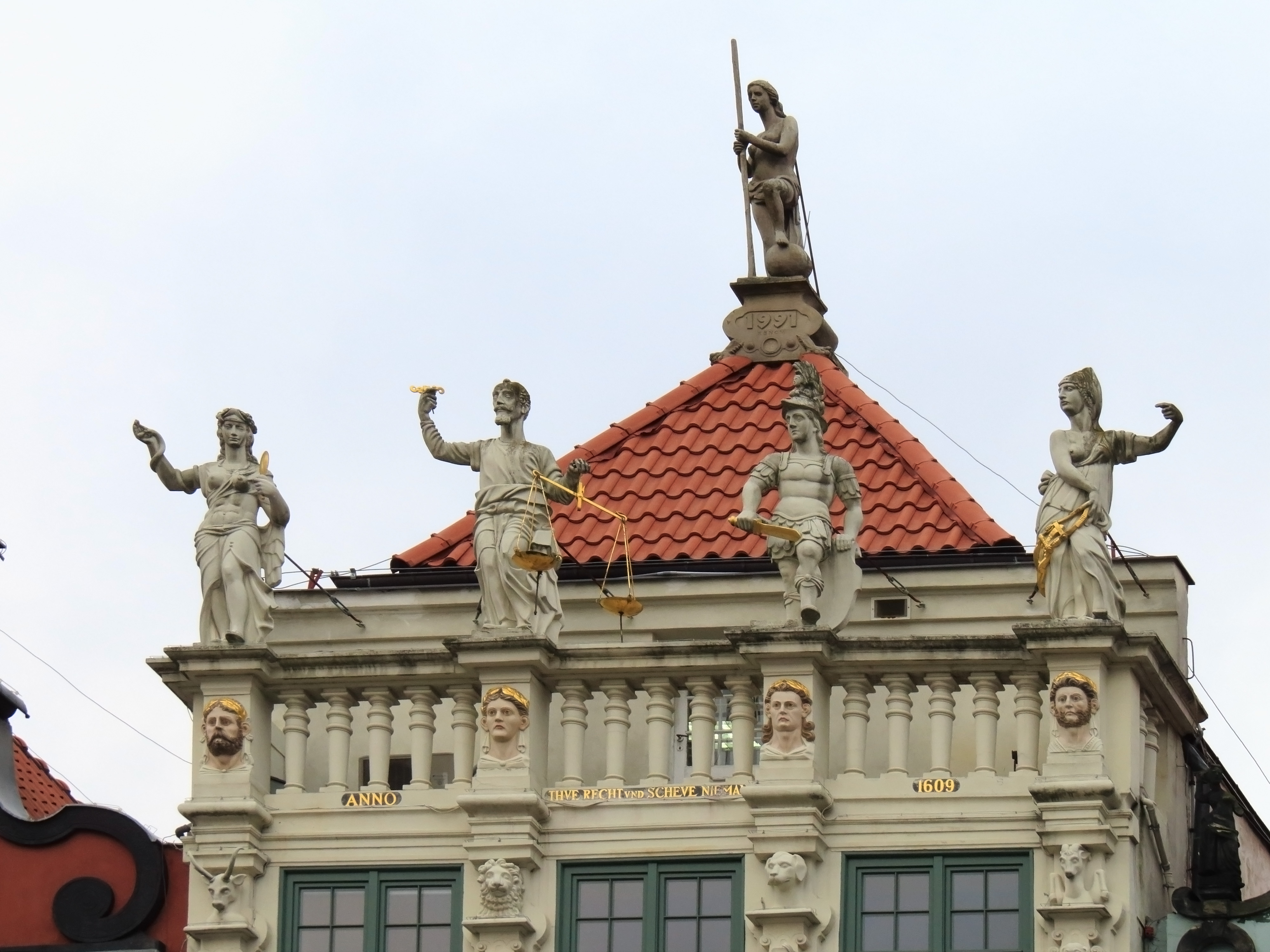
Sculptures atop the Steffens House

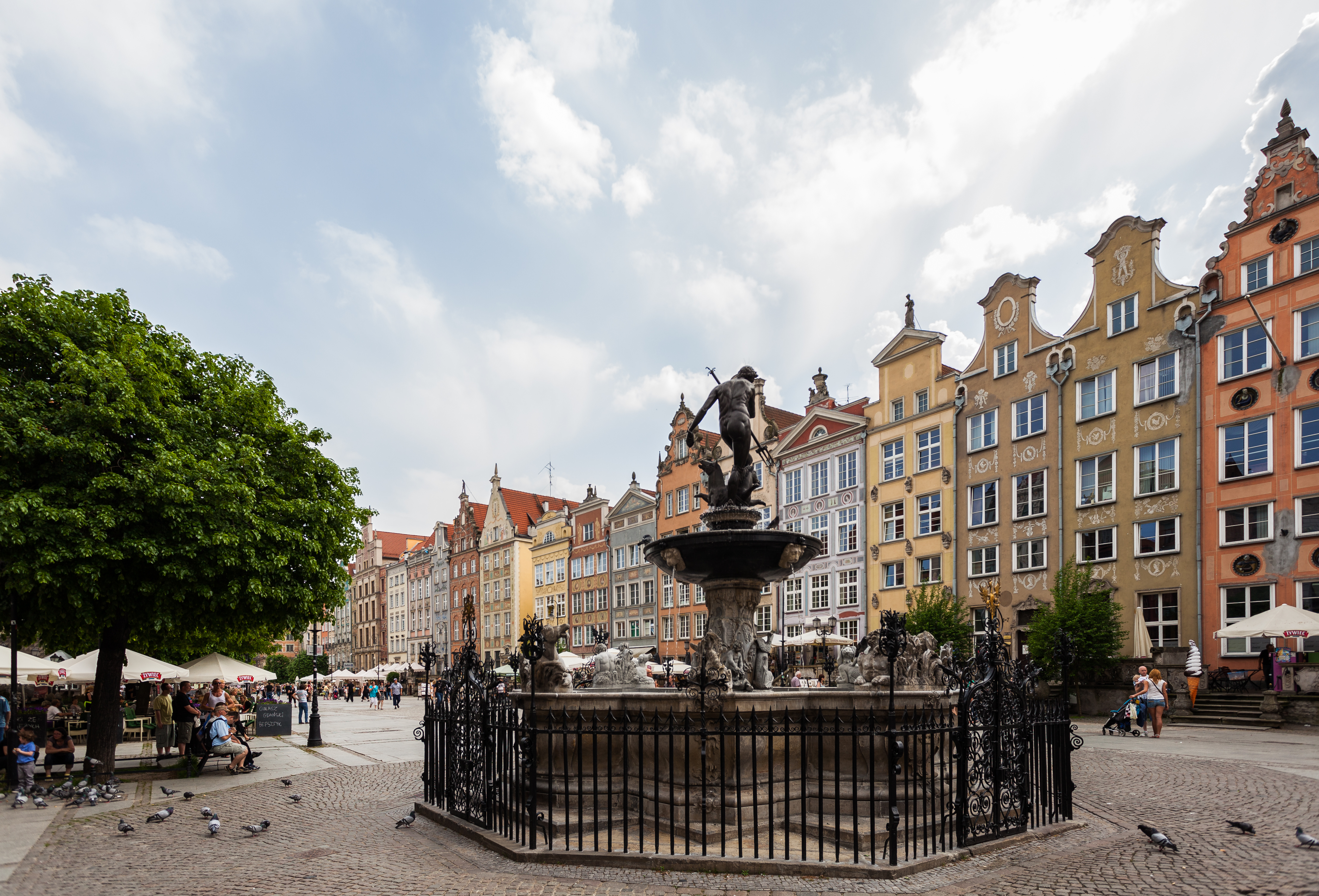
Neptune's Fountain and Długi Targ (Long Market)

The city has many reconstructed buildings originally built in the time of the Hanseatic League, most of which are located in the Main City and specifically along or near Ulica Długa and Długi Targ, a pedestrian thoroughfare surrounded by reconstructed historical buildings and flanked at both ends by elaborate city gates; this is sometimes referred to as the Royal Route, since it was once the path of processions for visiting Kings of Poland.

Walking from end to end, sites encountered on or near the Royal Route include the Highland Gate, marking the beginning of the route, located near the Torture Chamber, Mansion of the Society of Saint George, and the Golden Gate.

Along Długa Street, Uphagen's House is found, today housing a branch of the Gdańsk Museum, which is located near the Lion's Castle and the Main City Hall. Further down the route, along the Długi Targ, the Artus Court is located, followed by Neptune's Fountain, the New Jury House, the Steffens House, and the Green Gate. Gdańsk has a number of historical churches, including St. Catherine's Church, St. Nicholas' Church and St. Mary's Church (Bazylika Mariacka). St. Mary's Church is a city church built in the 15th century, and is one of the largest brick churches in the world. The city centre within 17th-century fortifications is a Historic Monument of Poland.

Other notable sights in the historical city centre include the Royal Chapel, Gdańsk Crane, Great Armoury, granaries on Ołowianka and Wyspa Spichrzów, the John III Sobieski Monument, the Old Town Hall, Mariacka Street, the Polish Post Office, and a series of city gates. Main sights outside the historical city centre include the Abbot's Palace, Oliwa Cathedral, Brzeźno Pier, medieval city walls, Westerplatte, Wisłoujście Fortress, and Gdańsk Zoo. The Olivia Centre, found in Oliwa, includes Olivia Star, the tallest building in northern Poland, measuring 180 metres (590 ft).

=== Museums ===
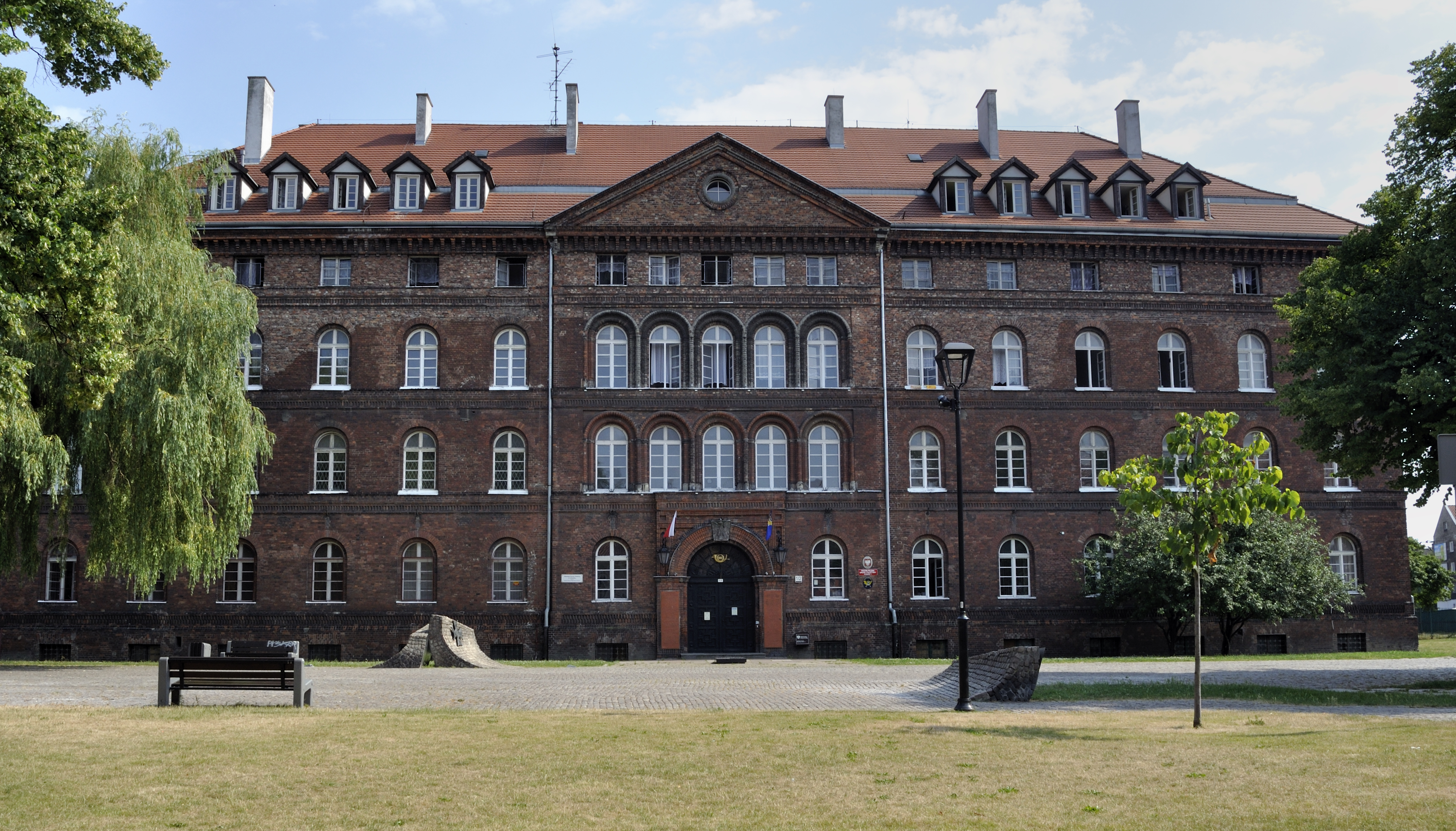
The Polish Post Office museum, dedicated to the Defence of the Polish Post Office in the Free City, which functioned during the interwar period, 1920–1939.

The National Museum includes the Department of Historical Art in Stare Przedmieście, the Department of Modern Art and the nearby Department of Ethnography in Oliwa, and the NOMUS modern art gallery and the Gdańsk Gallery of Photography in Stare Miasto. It also has departments in Kościerzyna and Waplewo Wielkie, those being the Museum of the National Anthem and Museum of Noble Tradition respectively.

The Gdańsk Museum is also present in the city and has departments in the Main City Hall, Artus Court, Uphagen's House, Great Mill, Polish Post Office, Wisłoujście Fortress, Westerplatte Guard House No. 1, St. Catherine's Church, and Oliwa Water Forge. Another museum is the National Maritime Museum, which operates a branch in the Gdańsk Crane, as well as the museum ship SS Sołdek. Its main building is found in the Main City and is accompanied by the Centre for Maritime Culture closer to the mouth of the Vistula. It has branches in Gdynia, Hel, Kąty Rybackie, Łeba, and Tczew. Other museums include the European Solidarity Centre, dedicated to the history of the Solidarity trade union; the Archdiocese Museum in Oliwa, about the history of the city's archdiocese; and the Museum of the Second World War.

=== Entertainment ===
The Polish Baltic Philharmonic exists on Ołowianka and frequently collaborates with various playwrights and theatres. The Baltic Opera is a similar institution. The Gdańsk Shakespeare Theatre is a Shakespearean theatre built on the former site of a 17th-century playhouse where English travelling players came to perform. The new theatre, completed in 2014, hosts the annual Gdańsk Shakespeare Festival. The annual St. Dominic's Fair combines traditional market trading with a wide range of cultural events.

== Transport ==
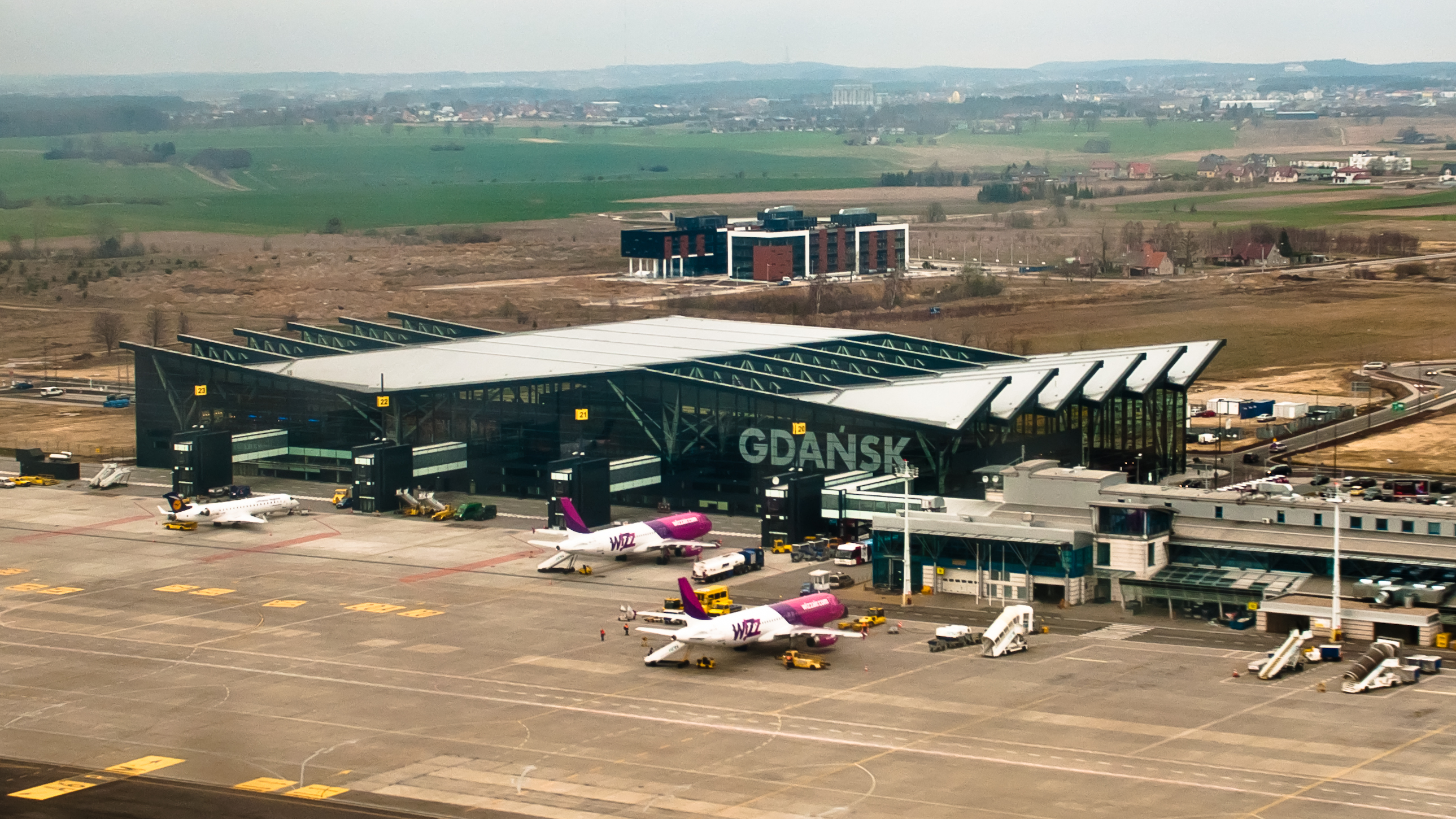
Gdańsk Lech Wałęsa Airport (2012, before the 2022 expansion)

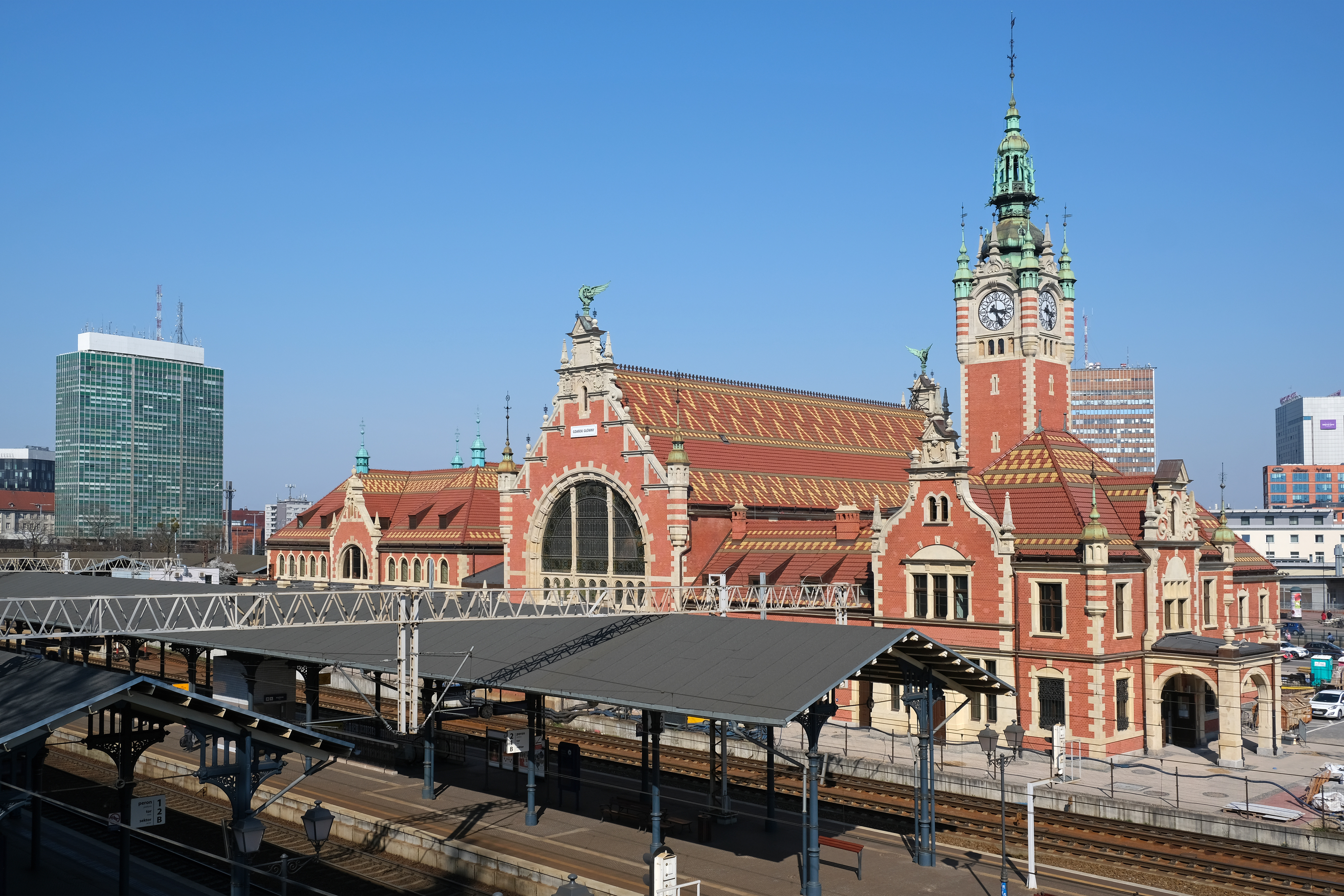
Gdańsk Główny railway station

The city's core transport infrastructure includes Gdańsk Lech Wałęsa Airport, an international airport located in Gdańsk, the Szybka Kolej Miejska (SKM), which functions as a rapid transit system for the Tricity area, including Gdańsk, Sopot and Gdynia, operating frequent trains to 27 stations covering the Tricity, and the Pomeranian Metropolitan Railway, a commuter railway opened in 2015 linking Gdańsk Wrzeszcz railway station with Gdynia Główna railway station via the airport.

The principal train station in Gdańsk is Gdańsk Główny railway station, served by both SKM local and PKP long-distance trains. In addition, long-distance trains also stop at Gdańsk Oliwa railway station and Gdańsk Wrzeszcz railway station. Gdańsk also has nine other railway stations, served by SKM trains. Long-distance trains are operated by PKP Intercity which provides connections with most major Polish cities, including Warsaw, Kraków, Łódź, Poznań, Katowice, Szczecin, Częstochowa, and Wrocław. Polregio operates regional trains with the neighbouring Kashubian Lake District along with trains to Słupsk, Hel, Malbork, and Elbląg.

Between 2011 and 2015, the rail route between Gdańsk, Gdynia, and Warsaw underwent a major upgrade, resulting in improvements in the railway's speed and to critical infrastructure such as signalling systems, as well as the construction of the Pomeranian Metropolitan Railway, a major commuter railway project, which was opened in 2015.

Gdańsk bus station is the city's principal bus terminal. City buses and trams are operated by ZTM Gdańsk (Zarząd Transportu Miejskiego w Gdańsku). The Port of Gdańsk is a seaport located on the southern coast of Gdańsk Bay, located within the city, and the Obwodnica Trójmiejska and A1 autostrada allow for automotive access to the city. Additionally, Gdańsk is part of the Rail-2-Sea project. This project's objective is to connect the city with the Romanian Black Sea port of Constanța with a 3,663 km (2,276 mi) long railway line passing through Poland, Slovakia, Hungary and Romania.

== Sport ==
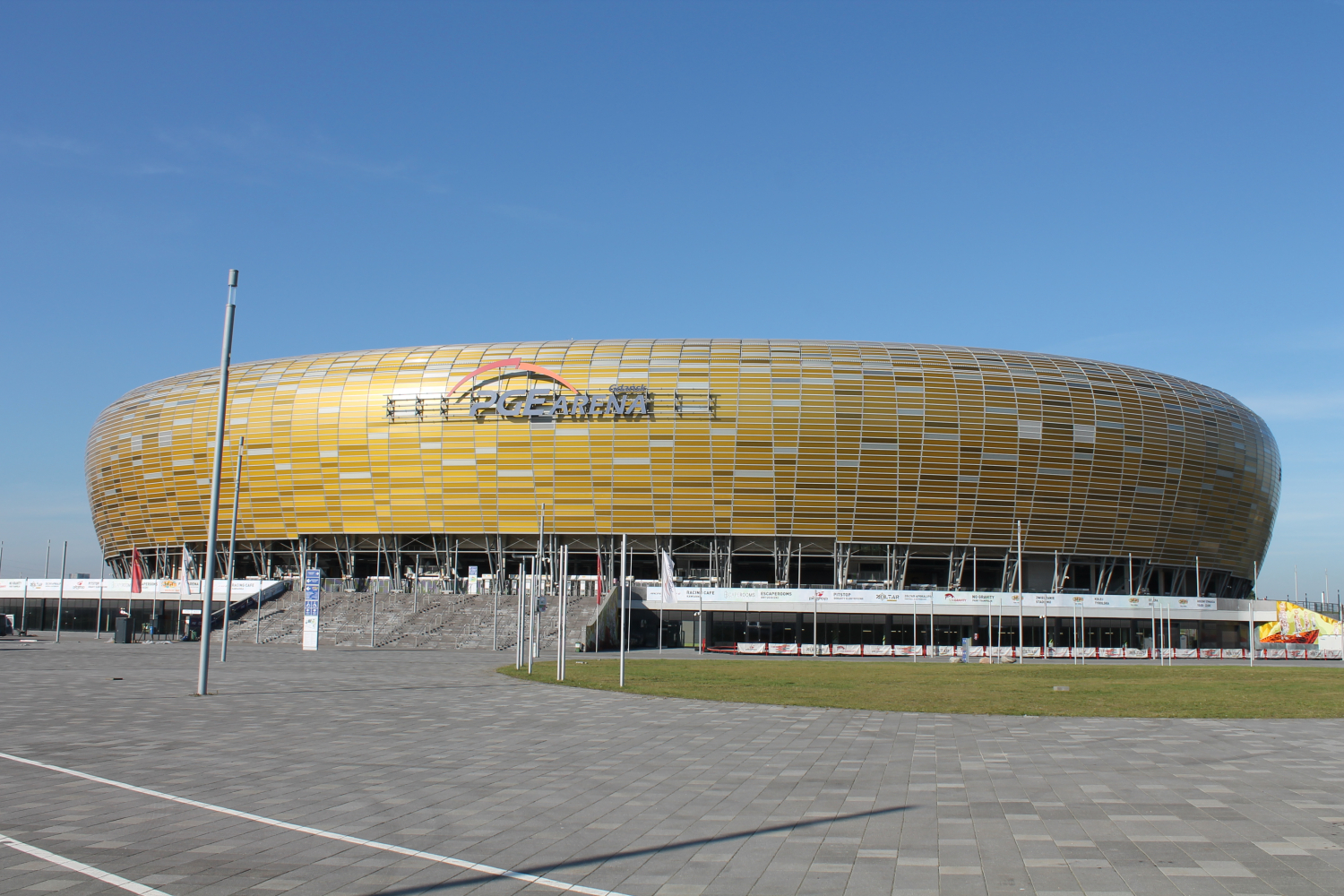
Stadion Miejski

There are many professional sports teams in the Gdańsk and Tricity area. The city's professional football club is Lechia Gdańsk. Founded in 1945, they play in the Ekstraklasa, Poland's top division. Their home stadium, Stadion Miejski, was one of the four Polish stadiums to host the UEFA Euro 2012 competition, as well as the host of the 2021 UEFA Europa League Final. Other notable football clubs are Gedania 1922 Gdańsk and SKS Stoczniowiec Gdańsk, which both played in the second tier in the past. Other notable clubs include speedway club Wybrzeże Gdańsk, rugby club Lechia Gdańsk, ice hockey club Stoczniowiec Gdańsk, and volleyball club Trefl Gdańsk.

The city's Hala Olivia was a venue for the official 2009 EuroBasket, and the Ergo Arena was one of the 2013 Men's European Volleyball Championship, 2014 FIVB Volleyball Men's World Championship and 2014 IAAF World Indoor Championships venues.

== Politics and local government ==
Contemporary Gdańsk is one of the major centres of economic and administrative life in Poland. It is the seat of a Polish central institution, the Polish Space Agency, several supra-regional branches of further central institutions, as well as the supra-regional (appellate-level) institutions of justice. As the capital of the Pomeranian Voivodeship it has been the seat of the Pomeranian Voivodeship Office, the Sejmik, and the Marshal's Office of the Pomeranian Voivodeship and other voivodeship-level institutions.

Legislative power in Gdańsk is vested in a unicameral Gdańsk City Council (Rada Miasta), which comprises 34 members. Council members are elected directly every four years. Like most legislative bodies, the City Council divides itself into committees, which have the oversight of various functions of the city government.

=== Districts ===
Gdańsk is divided into 36 districts (dzielnice), most of which are also subdivided into osiedla. A full list can be found at Districts of Gdańsk, but the largest by population include Śródmieście, Przymorze Wielkie, Chełm, Wrzeszcz Dolny, and Wrzeszcz Górny. Śródmieście encompasses most of the city as it was in 1813. The city's boundaries were first expanded beyond the borders of Śródmieście in 1814, and various districts were gradually incorporated into it (with larger expansions including the annexation of Oliwa in 1926 and Suchanino in 1902). Many of the city's current suburban districts, such as Jasień, Ujeścisko-Łostowice, Matarnia, and Osowa, were incorporated into it in a 1973 expansion.

== Education and science ==
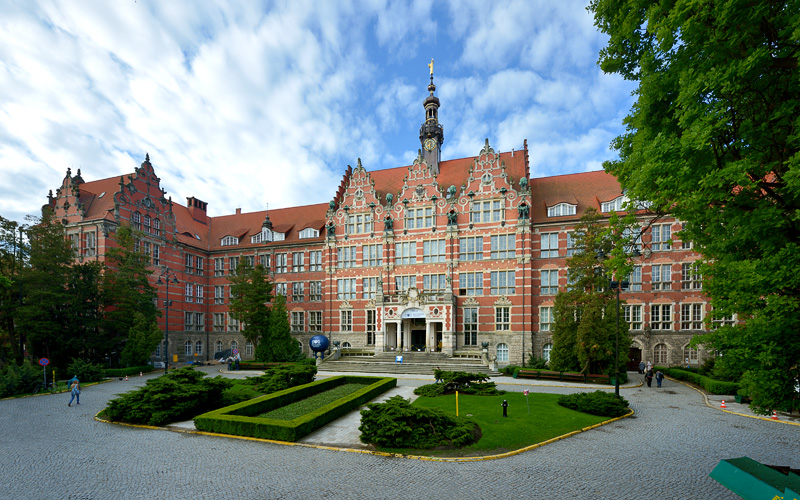
Gdańsk University of Technology

There are 15 higher schools in the city, including three universities. Notable educational institutions include the University of Gdańsk, Gdańsk University of Technology, and Gdańsk Medical University. The city is also home to the Baltic Institute.

== International relations ==
=== Consulates ===
There are four consulates general in Gdańsk – China, Germany, Hungary, Russia, one consulate – Ukraine, and 17 honorary consulates – Austria, Bangladesh, Bulgaria, Estonia, Ethiopia, Kazakhstan, Latvia, Lithuania, Mexico, Moldova, Netherlands, Peru, Seychelles, Spain, Sri Lanka, Sweden, Uruguay.

=== Sister cities ===
Gdańsk is twinned with:

- Helsingør, Denmark
- Bremen, Germany
- Cleveland, United States
- Kalmar, Sweden
- Nice, France
- Astana, Kazakhstan
- Rotterdam, Netherlands
- Sefton, United Kingdom
- Turku, Finland
- Vilnius, Lithuania

=== Former sister cities ===
- Kaliningrad, Russia
- Saint Petersburg, Russia

On 3 March 2022, Gdańsk City Council passed a unanimous resolution to terminate the cooperation with the Russian cities of Kaliningrad and Saint Petersburg as a response to the Russian invasion of Ukraine.

=== Cooperation with non-sister cities ===
Gdańsk also cooperates with the following non-sister cities:

- Ghent, Belgium
- Le Havre, France
- Marseille, France
- Odesa, Ukraine

== Demographics ==
Historical population
Year	Pop.	±%
1890	120,338	—
1910	170,337	+41.5%
1929	256,403	+50.5%
1945	139,078	−45.8%
1946	117,894	−15.2%
1950	194,633	+65.1%
1960	286,940	+47.4%
1970	365,600	+27.4%
1978	442,118	+20.9%
1988	464,308	+5.0%
2002	461,334	−0.6%
2011	460,276	−0.2%
2021	486,022	+5.6%
2024	488,000	+0.4%

Gdańsk population pyramid in 2021

Around 1600, the city’s population was composed of over 90% Germans and adherents of Protestantism. Around 1700, more than 80% of the inhabitants were Protestants, followed by Catholics with about 10% and a smaller but significant group of Calvinists, while German remained the dominant language. According to another source, in year 1770, shortly before the Partitions of Poland, only 58% of the inhabitants were Germans, while 42% were all others (including Poles and Kashubians). By 1816, the proportion of Catholics had risen to 23.6%, whereas Protestants accounted for 70% of the population. In 1890, according to Stefan Ramułt there were 92.28% Germans, 0.94% Poles, 4.50% Kashubians, 2.11% Jews and 0.17% others. In the 1920 election, 6.5% of the inhabitants voted for the Polish Party while the 1923 census conducted in the Free City of Danzig indicated that of all inhabitants in the city proper, 95% were German-speaking and 3.5% spoke Polish and Kashubian. In 1929, Poles and Kashubians accounted for 11% of Danzig‘s total population (23,120 people out of 215,464). The end of World War II is a significant break in continuity with regard to the inhabitants of Gdańsk.

German citizens began to flee en masse as the Soviet Red Army advanced, composed of both spontaneous flights driven by rumours of Soviet atrocities, and organised evacuation starting in the summer of 1944 which continued into the spring of 1945. Approximately 1% (100,000) of the German civilian population residing east of the Oder–Neisse line perished in the fighting prior to the surrender in May 1945. German civilians were also sent as "reparations labour" to the Soviet Union.

Poles from other parts of Poland replaced the former German-speaking population, with the first settlers arriving in March 1945. On 30 March 1945, the Gdańsk Voivodeship was established as the first administrative Polish unit in the Recovered Territories. As of 1 November 1945, around 93,029 Germans remained within the city limits. Ethnically German population was then expelled to Germany, while these of the locals who declared Polish nationality and were ethnically verified as Poles were permitted to remain; according to the census of 1950 out of 194,633 inhabitants of Gdańsk 12% (23,442) were pre-war autochthons of the Regained Lands, including 22,213 from the city of Gdańsk itself, 828 from neighbouring areas of the Free City and 401 from elsewhere.

The settlers can be grouped according to their background:

- Poles that had been freed from forced labour in Nazi Germany
- Repatriates: Poles expelled from the areas east of the new Polish-Soviet border. This included assimilated minorities such as the Polish-Armenian community
- Poles incl. Kashubians relocating from nearby villages and small towns
- Settlers from central Poland migrating voluntarily
- Non-Poles forcibly resettled during Operation Vistula in 1947. Large numbers of Ukrainians were forced to move from south-eastern Poland under a 1947 Polish government operation aimed at dispersing, and therefore assimilating, those Ukrainians who had not been expelled eastward already, throughout the newly acquired territories. Belarusians living around the area around Białystok were also pressured into relocating to the formerly German areas for the same reasons. This scattering of members of non-Polish ethnic groups throughout the country was an attempt by the Polish authorities to dissolve the unique ethnic identity of groups like the Ukrainians, Belarusians, and Lemkos, and broke the proximity and communication necessary for strong communities to form.
- Jewish Holocaust survivors, most of them Polish repatriates from the Eastern Borderlands
- Greeks and Slav Macedonians, refugees of the Greek Civil War

== See also ==
- 764 Gedania – Minor planet named after Gdańsk
- Danzig Highflyer – Breed of pigeon
- Danzig Trilogy – Novels by Günter Grass
- Father Eugeniusz Dutkiewicz SAC Hospice – Polish charitable organization
- Kashubians – West Slavic ethnic group
- Laznia Centre for Contemporary Art – Art centre in Gdańsk, Poland
- List of honorary citizens of Gdańsk
- List of neighbourhoods of Gdańsk
- Live in Gdańsk
- Orunia Park – Park in Gdańsk, Poland
- Ronald Reagan Park – Park in Gdańsk, Poland
- St. Mary's Church, Gdańsk
- Tourism in Poland

== Sources ==
- Loew, Peter Oliver (2024). Gdańsk: Portrait of a City. New York: Oxford University Press. ISBN 9780197603864.
- Możejko, Beata, ed. (31 March 2017). New Studies in Medieval and Renaissance Poland and Prussia: The Impact of Gdańsk. Taylor & Francis. ISBN 9781351805445.
- Kamusella, Tomasz (2004), Steffen Prauser; Arfon Rees (eds.), "The Expulsion of the Population Categorized as 'Germans' from the Post-1945 Poland" (PDF), The Expulsion of the 'German' Communities from Eastern Europe at the End of the Second World War, European University Institute, Florence. Department of History and Civilization, pp. 21–30, EUI Working Paper HEC No. 2004/1, archived from the original (PDF direct download, 2.52 MB) on 25 May 2014
- Kimmich, Christoph M (1968). The free city: Danzig and German foreign policy, 1919–1934. New Haven, Connecticut: Yale University Press.
- Rudziński, Grzegorz (1 March 2001). Gdańsk. Bonechi. ISBN 978-88-476-0517-6. Archived from the original on 11 October 2013.
- Simson, Paul (October 2009). Geschichte Der Stadt Danzig. BiblioBazaar, LLC. ISBN 978-1-115-53256-3. Archived from the original on 11 October 2013.
- Śliwiński, Błażej (2006). "O rzece 'Gdani' i początkach Gdańska. Uwagi historyka do ustaleń językoznawców" ["About the river 'Gdania' and the beginnings of Gdańsk. Historian's comments on the findings of linguists"]. Acta Cassubiana. 8: 11–23.
