= Districts of Gdańsk =

Districts of the city of Gdańsk, Poland

This is a list of the current city districts of Gdańsk. Former districts are listed in the "Former districts" section.

== Modern division of administrative districts of Gdańsk (since 2019) ==
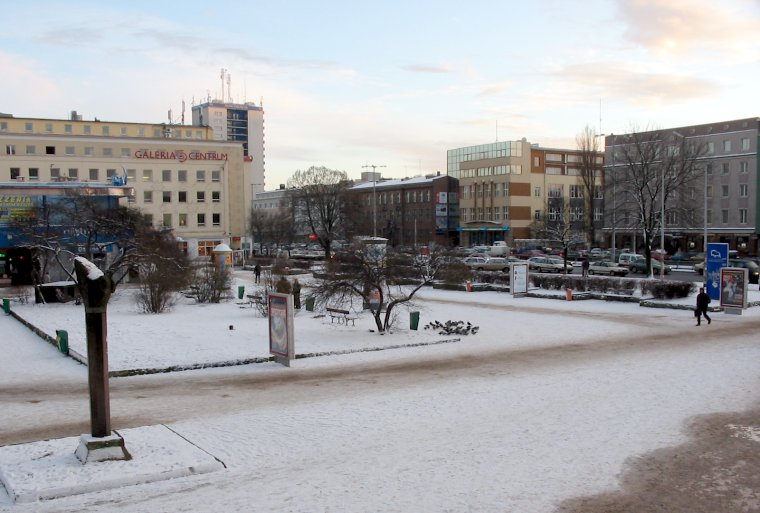
borough of Wrzeszcz

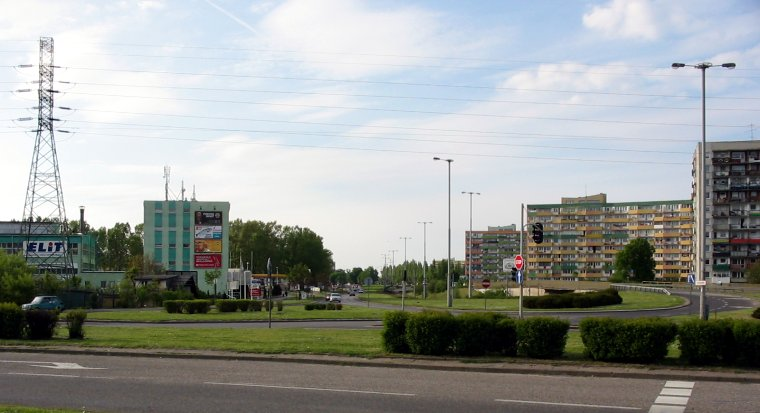
borough of Przymorze

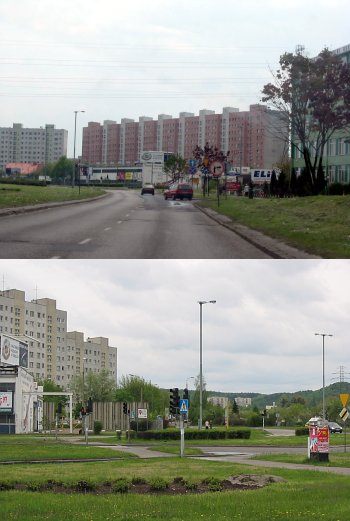
borough of Zaspa

The city of Gdańsk was divided into 34 administrative districts (dzielnica administracyjna) from 2010 to 2018. The City of Gdańsk has been divided into 35 administrative districts since March 2019:

#	Name	Population	Area (km^{2})	Density (pop/km^{2})
1	Osowa	8053	13.6	592
2	Oliwa	22431	18.5	1209
3	Żabianka-Wejhera-Jelitkowo-Tysiąclecia	23145	2.1	10923
4	Przymorze Małe	18017	2.3	7786
5	Przymorze Wielkie	36260	3.3	10840
6	VII Dwór	4879	3.2	1 507
7	Strzyża	6569	1.2	5 571
8	Zaspa-Młyniec	16471	1.3	13144
9	Zaspa-Rozstaje	15118	1.9	7833
10	Brzeźno	16514	2.7	6123
11	Matarnia	5613	14.9	376
12	Brętowo	7944	7.4	1074
13	Wrzeszcz Dolny	25503	3.5	7287
14	Wrzeszcz Górny	24697	6.4	3847
15	Letnica	2024	4.5	452
16	Nowy Port	12913	2.3	5603
17	Piecki-Migowo	23593	3.8	6224
18	Suchanino	12937	1.3	9812
19	Siedlce	17584	2.6	6684
20	Wzgórze Mickiewicza	2578	0.6	4268
21	Aniołki	6774	2.3	2949
22	Młyniska	4551	4.0	1136
23	Stogi	11578	11.0	1057
24	Przeróbka	4522	6.9	657
25	Śródmieście	39770	5.5	7219
26	Krakowiec-Górki Zachodnie	2301	8.8	261
27	Wyspa Sobieszewska	3570	34.3	104
28	Kokoszki	4659	20.0	233
29	Chełm	32242	3.9	8288
30	Ujeścisko-Łostowice	20671	7.9	2627
31	Jasień	11078	11.5	968
32	Orunia-Św. Wojciech-Lipce	20317	19.7	1032
33	Olszynka	3514	7.7	458
34	Rudniki	2104	14.5	145
35	Orunia Górna-Gdańsk Południe	19807	7.2	2800

=== Former districts ===
- Chełm i Gdańsk Południe, divided into:
  - Chełm
  - Jasień
  - Orunia Górna-Gdańsk Południe
  - Ujeścisko-Łostowice
- Stogi z Przeróbką, divided into:
  - Stogi
  - Przeróbka
- Wrzeszcz, divided into:
  - Wrzeszcz Dolny
  - Wrzeszcz Górny
