= Orunia Park =

Park in Gdańsk, Poland

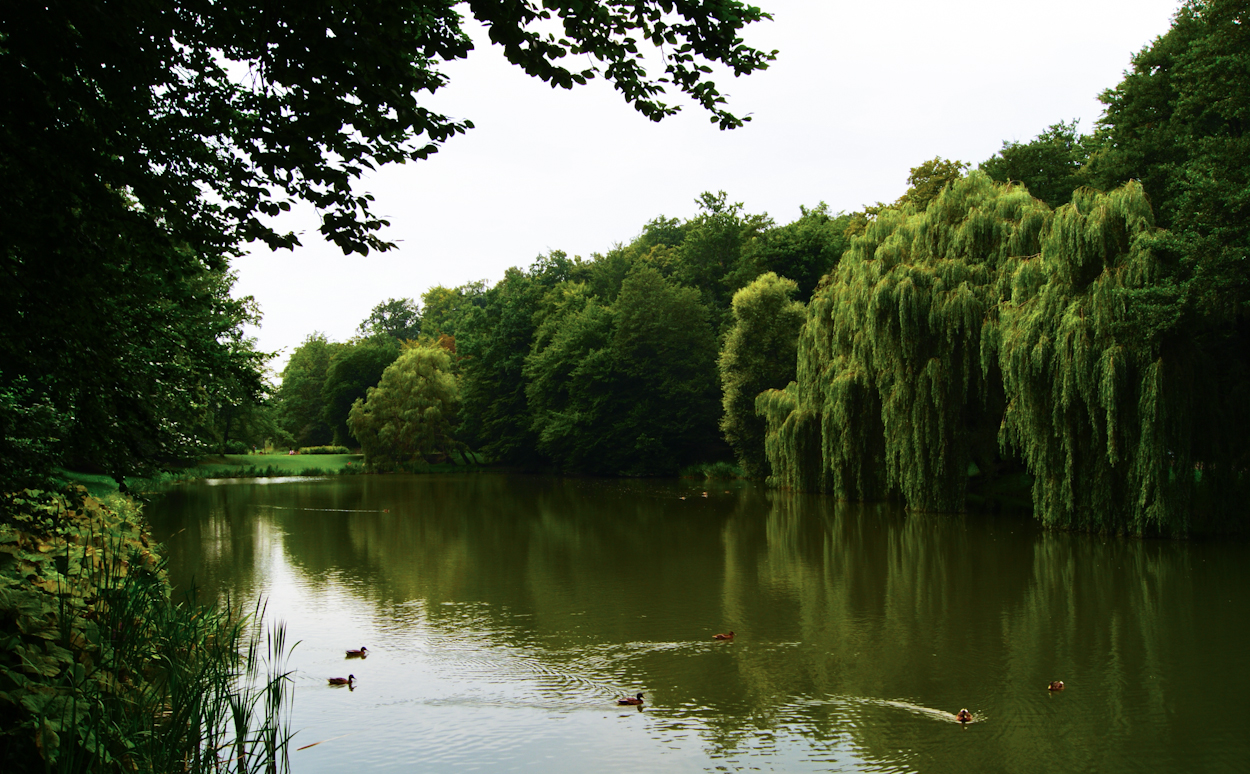
- Interactive map of Orunia Park
- Location: Gdańsk, Poland
- Coordinates: 54°19′21″N 18°37′39″E
- Area: 19 ha (47 acres)
- Created: 17th century

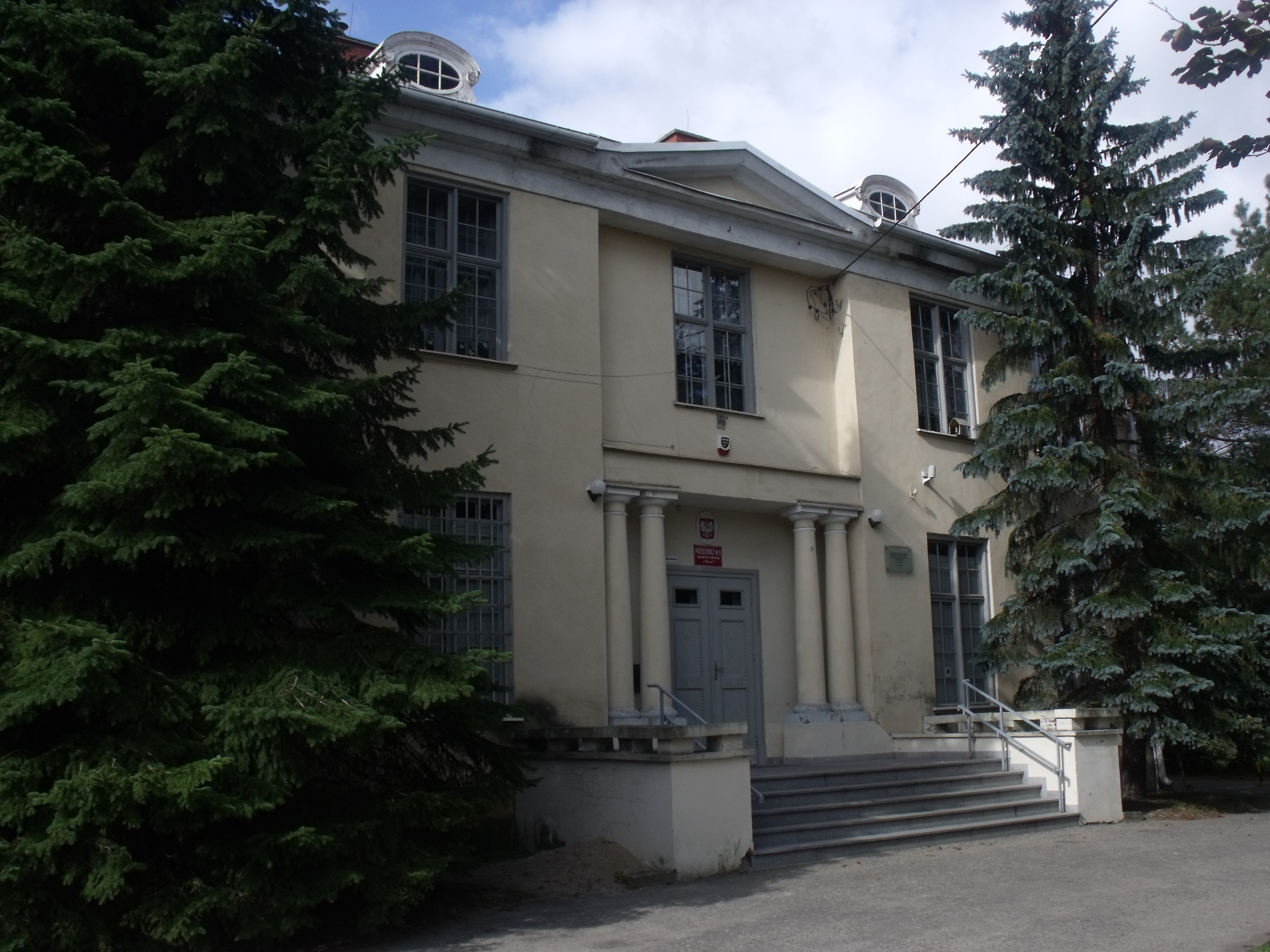
Historic manor house in Orunia Park

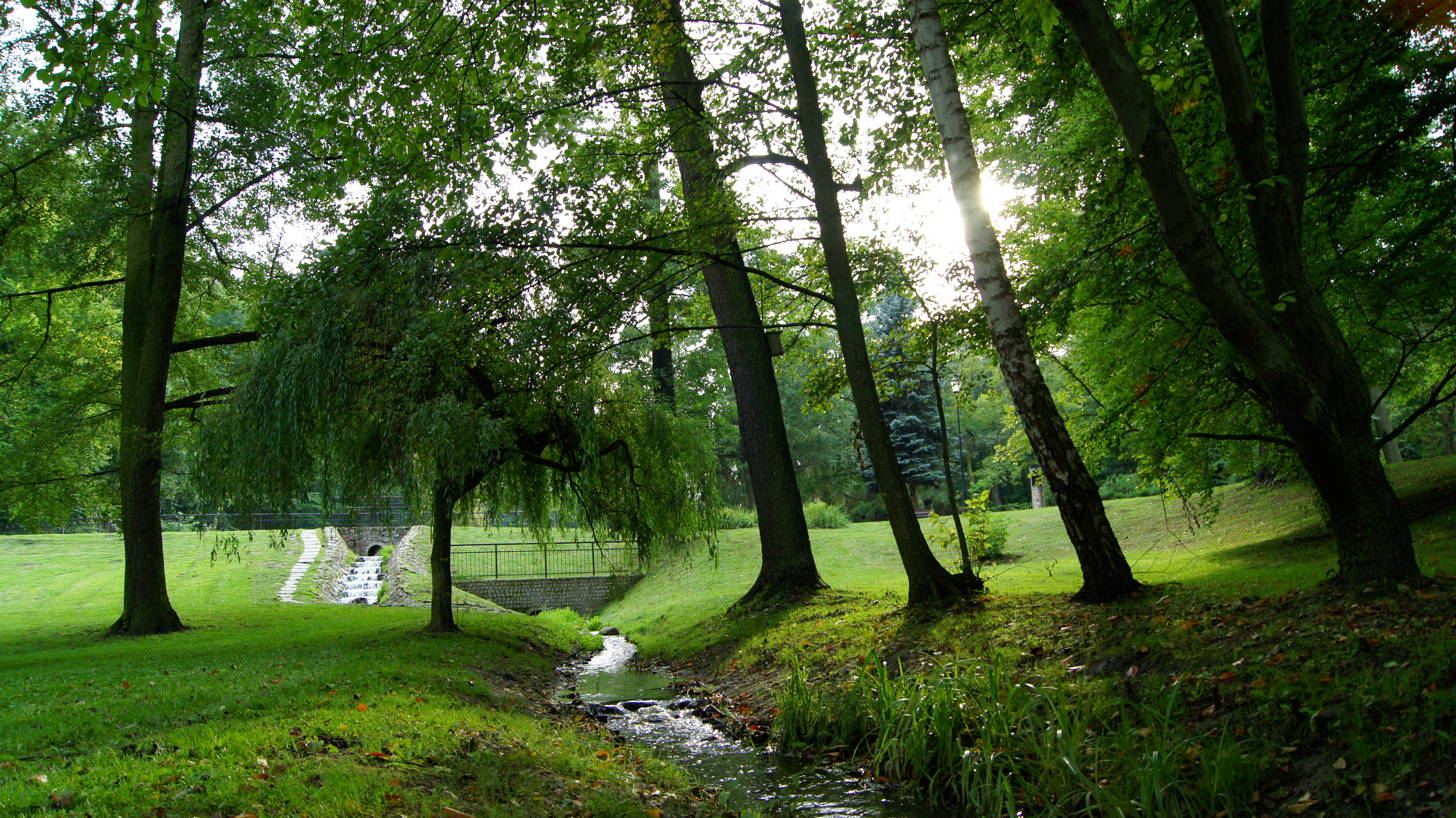
Stream between ponds

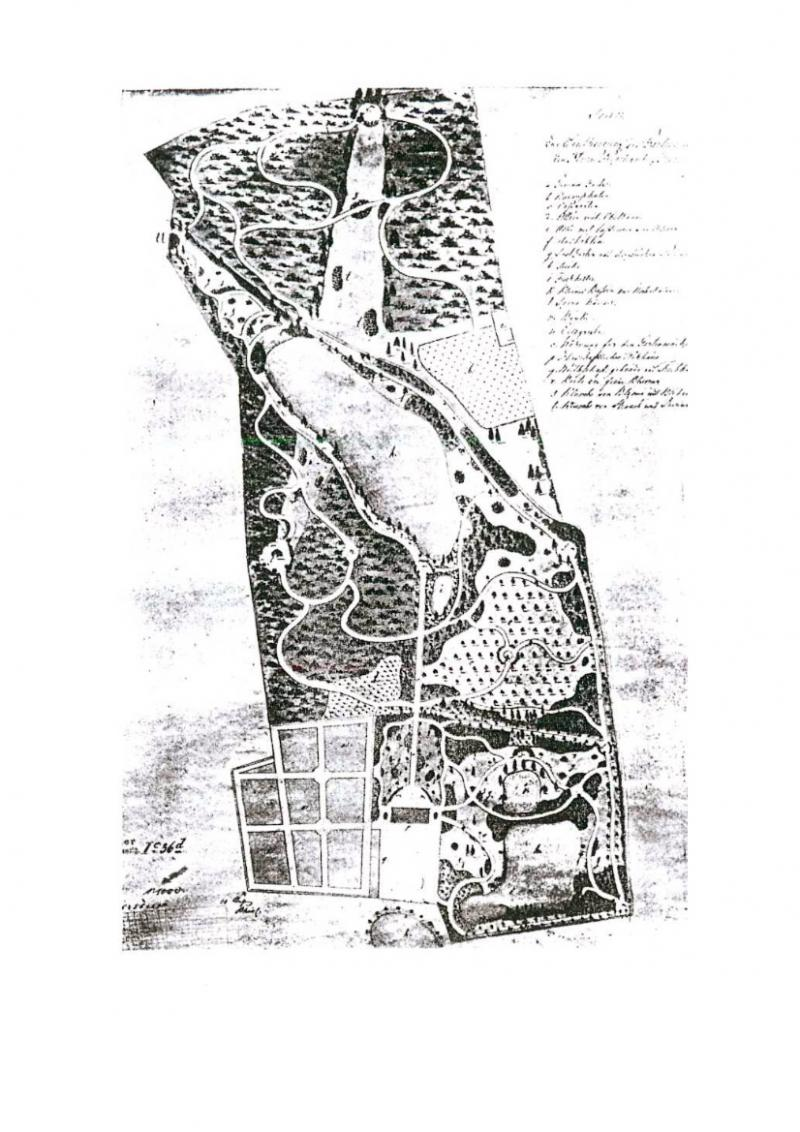
Map of the park from 1860

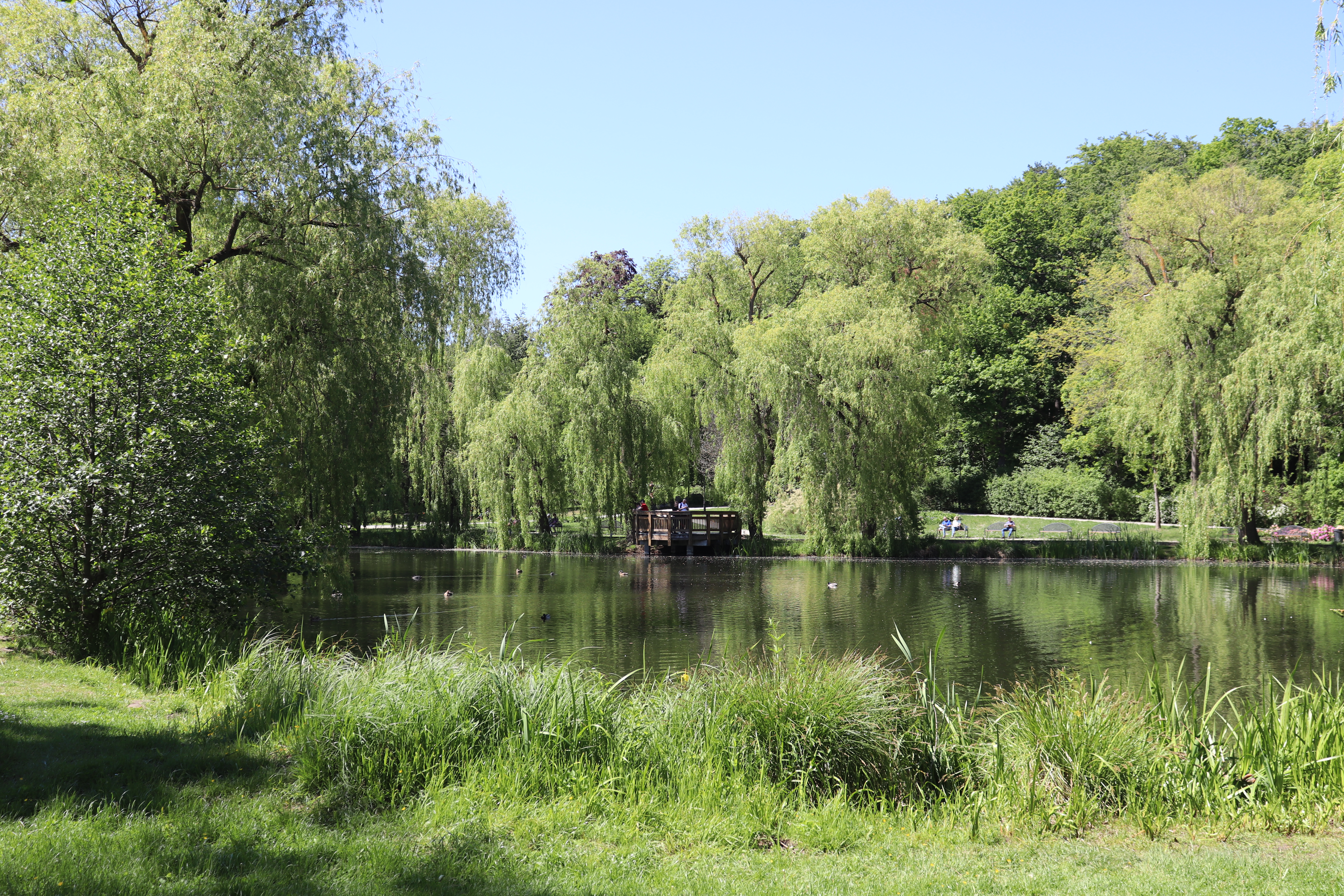
Lower pond

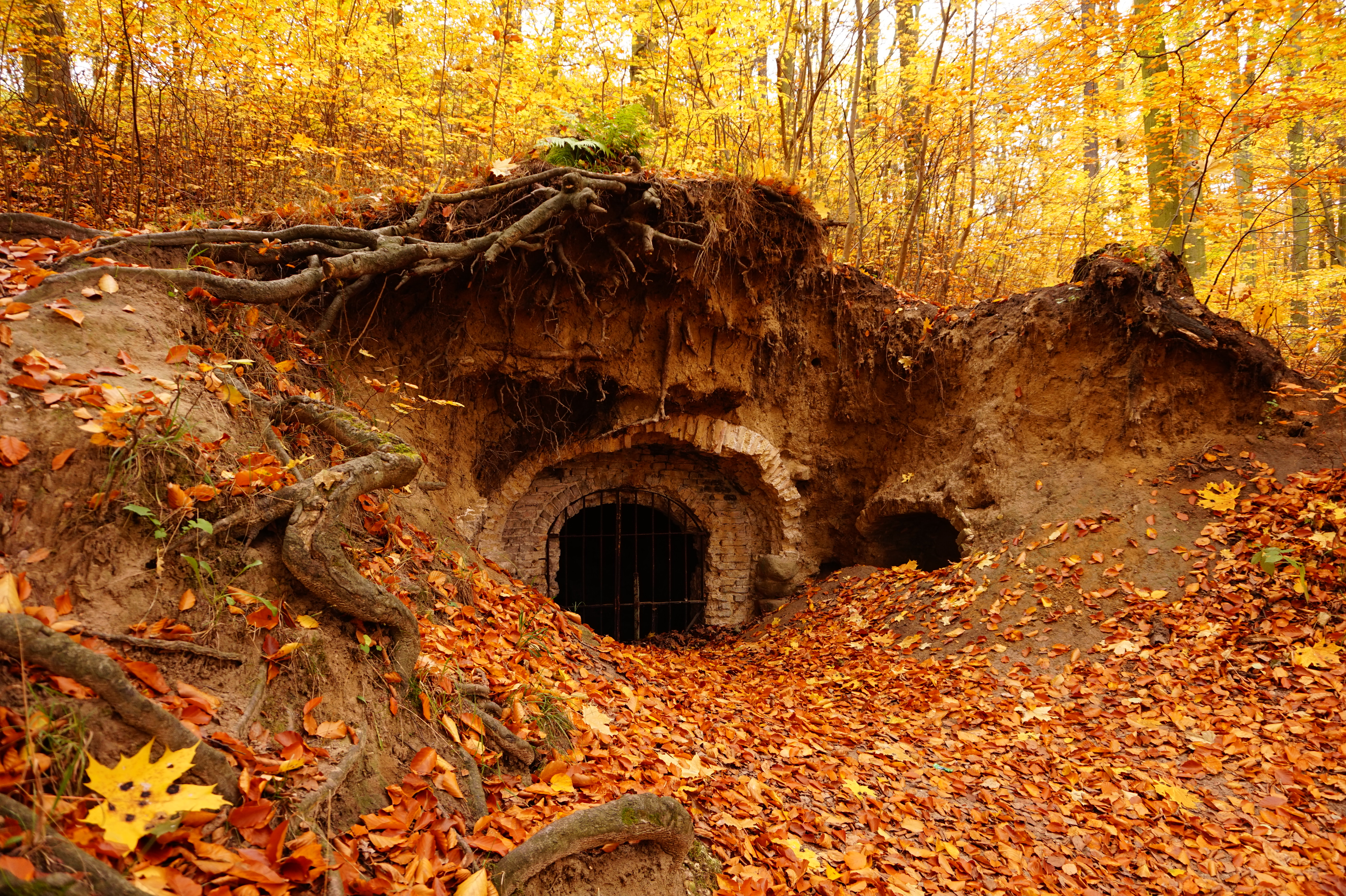
Ice house from the 17th century

Emilia Hoene Orunia Park (Polish: Park Oruński im. Emilii Hoene; German: Hoenepark) is a historic, third-largest municipal park in Gdańsk, and the largest among the historical parks. It is located along the Orunia Stream, on the border of the districts of Orunia-Św. Wojciech-Lipce and Orunia Górna-Gdańsk Południe.

It is part of the protected landscape and nature complex Valley of the Orunia Stream.

== Location ==
Orunia Park is located in the southern part of the city, in Orunia, at 2 Nowiny Street. It lies in a valley stretching from Łostowice to the Radunia Canal, which borders the park to the east. The Orunia Stream flows through the valley, creating a cascade within the park, and empties into the Radunia Canal at the park's edge. The valley's unique terraced slopes and vegetation, among others, were preserved when it was declared a protected area in 1999. South of the park is the Old Orunia Water Reservoir, a hydrotechnical monument that is part of the Natura 2000 network.

Within the park, there are two ponds: the upper (larger) pond, fed by the Orunia Stream, and the lower (smaller) pond. They are connected by a stream.

The park covers an area of 19 hectares.

=== Hills ===
The park area is bordered by the following hills:

- To the north: Góra Łez and Góra Gliniana
- To the south: Góra Pięciu Braci

These hills are associated with local legends. Among their distinctive features are glacial erratic stones, remnants of ancient ice ages that lend a unique geological charm to the landscape.

== Nature ==
The vegetation in the Orunia Stream valley, where the park is located, is distinct from that of the surrounding area. This habitat supports a variety of uncommon plant species, such as the branched St Bernard's-lily, often found in pristine or ancient woodland settings. The valley is also home to strictly protected species like the cuckoopint, known for its spadix inflorescence, giant bellflower, and common hepatica, which all serve as botanical relics offering insights into the historical vegetation of the region. These species not only enrich the biodiversity of the area but also contribute to ongoing scientific research and conservation efforts aimed at preserving rare and endemic flora within the park's ecosystem.

In addition to uncommon species, the park contains typical spring flora such as wood anemone, yellow anemone, yellow star-of-Bethlehem, Gagea pratensis, and Corydalis intermedia. The area also contains a diverse range of fungus species, essential for nutrient cycling and plant health.

=== Tree stand ===
The park's hills are covered with beech trees dating back to at least the 19th century. Additionally, oaks, alders, and linden trees can be found in the garden area. Weeping willows grow around the water bodies. In the 1840s, an avenue of 40 linden trees was planted in the park, running from the manor house to the upper pond. There was once a linden tree in the park, which was estimated to be 400 years old in 1906 and was said to have been planted by Queen Marie Casimire Sobieska according to a pre-war legend.

=== Natural monuments ===
Legally protected natural formations in the park include:

Natural monument	Height	Circumference	Register number
small-leaved linden	20 m	328 cm	1098
common beech	20 m	328 cm	1099
2 common beeches	26 m	260 and 290 cm	1100
sessile oak	25 m	356 cm	1101
glacial erratic	1,30 m	672 cm	1133

== History ==
=== Establishment ===
In past centuries, Orunia was a place of relaxation for the citizens of Gdańsk. There were suburban manor houses in the area. At the end of the 16th century, a hunting lodge existed there, which is already marked on a map from 1599. The first owners were the Tewes brothers, later followed by Gdańsk councilor Michał Kerl. At the beginning of the 17th century, the lodge passed into the hands of Gdańsk mayor Bartłomiej Schachmann, who transformed the area into a park-like estate. He initiated the creation of ponds and a stream.

In 1630, the park was acquired by Gdańsk mayor Johann Zierenberg. The park residence then became a meeting place for artists and the elite, and the park took on characteristics of a Renaissance garden, with extensive flower beds arranged in geometric shapes.

=== Golden era of the park ===
At the end of the 17th century, the park became the property of Gdańsk shipowner Albrecht Groddeck. In 1698, Augustus II the Strong stayed there. In 1734, during the Russian siege of Gdańsk, the park housed the quarters of Russian marshal Burkhard Christoph von Münnich, where the act of Gdańsk's capitulation was likely signed. The Groddeck family owned the park from 1685 to 1779.

In 1780, the park was acquired by Gdańsk botanist Gottfried Reyger. The park lost its Renaissance character in favor of a more natural spatial arrangement. Viewpoints were created, and a botanical garden was established where pineapples, citrus fruits, and coffee were grown. Reyger, a member of the Danzig Research Society, conducted botanical observations, resulting in his work On Wild Plants Growing Around Gdańsk, in which he identified the flowering times of 360 plants.

In 1798, during his travels from Prussia to Berlin, Frederick William III of Prussia made a notable visit to the park, leaving a mark on its history.

=== Prussian partition ===
In 1803, the palace and park were purchased by English merchant Edward Solly. However, the French occupation of Gdańsk in 1807 forced Solly to leave the area. The property then changed hands to Matthias Joseph Hanneman. During the tumultuous Napoleonic Wars in 1813, a fierce skirmish between French and Russian forces erupted in the park, leading to significant damage. The park's hill, Góra Łez (Hill of Tears), was named after this occurrence.

The park later passed into the hands of Gdańsk merchant Friedrich Hoene, who restored the garden and rebuilt the manor house, giving the park a Romantic character. At that time, there was a smaller third pond between the two existing ones, likely used for ornamental fish breeding.

=== Modern times ===
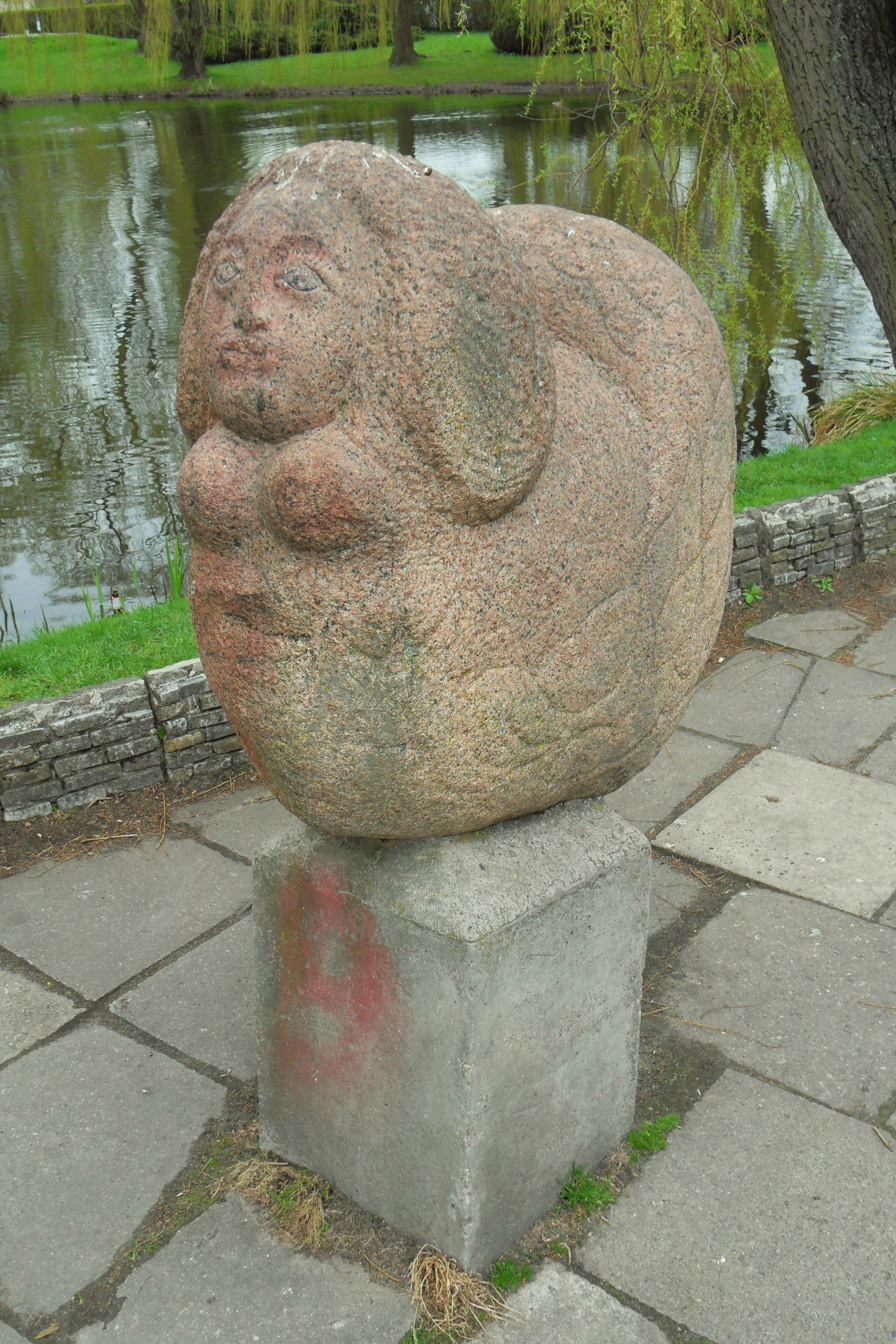
One of a group of four outdoor sculptures in the park

In 1918, the previously private garden was bequeathed to the city by the owner's daughter, Emilia Hoene. During the interwar period, Saint John's Eve celebrations with orchestral music were held in the park. In 1933, Orunia, along with the park, was incorporated into the administrative boundaries of Gdańsk.

Following World War II, ownership of the garden was transferred to the state. In the 1950s, the park manor was repurposed as a home for the elderly, and soon after, Public Kindergarten No. 9 was established, continuing its operation to this day. From 1974 to 1979, the park underwent a comprehensive revitalization initiative led by the Municipal Construction and Maintenance of Green Areas Company. The project, overseen by the Municipal Construction Project Office in Gdańsk, which attempted to preserve the park's 19th-century elegance while incorporating modern amenities like asphalt walkways, trellises, and new lighting systems. As part of the enhancement, sculptures crafted by Alfons Łosowski were strategically placed throughout the garden, adding a touch of artistic elegance to the revitalized landscape.

In 1980, an underground sewage collector for the Chełm i Gdańsk-Południe district was constructed 8 meters below the park. A scientific report from the University of Gdańsk indicated that this construction lowered the water table in the upper pond, accelerating tree die-off.

On 9 July 2001, the park was damaged during a flood in Gdańsk. Torrents of water cascading down from the hills overwhelmed the Orunia Stream, causing the upper pond to overflow and breach its banks. Despite the devastation, efforts were undertaken in the following years to repair the flood damage. In 2009, a concerted initiative commenced to restore the park to its 19th-century ambiance, aiming to revive its historical character while ensuring resilience against future natural events.

In 2017, a children's playground was opened adjacent to the park. That year also saw the completion of park revitalization, which began in 2014. An amphitheater, Orana, was built, and park paths and lighting were renewed. Following the results of a 2018 civic budget vote, a viewing tower was planned for the park.

In 2019, the headquarters of the Music Scene of the Gdańsk Archipelago of Culture moved from the city center to a building in the park at 2b Nowiny Street. The institution hosts concerts, film screenings, and meetings with notable figures. It also oversees the Orana Amphitheater in the park, where summer concerts are held.

== Tatar culture ==
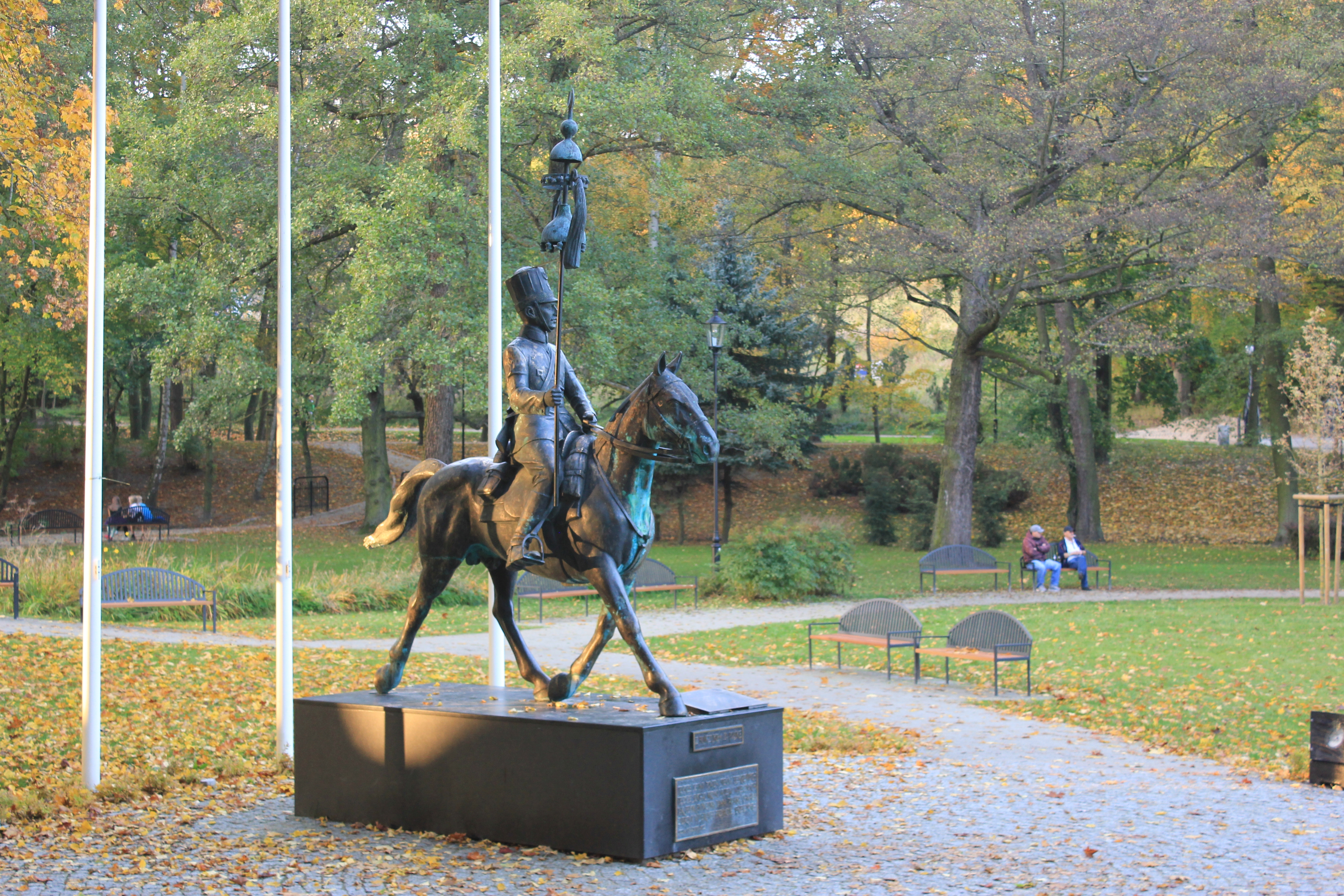
Tatar Monument at the National Center for Tatar Culture of the Republic of Poland

The building located within the park houses the headquarters of the National Center for Tatar Culture of the Republic of Poland named after Leon Mirza Kryczyński. It is part of the Union of Tatars of the Republic of Poland. This organization aims to unite Polish citizens of Tatar descent and preserve the over 600-year history and culture of Polish Tatars.

The Tatar Culture Center features an exhibition on the history of the Tatars in the Polish lands, as well as a small mosque and madrasa.

On 25 November 2010, President Bronisław Komorowski unveiled the Polish Tatar Monument in the park.

== Facilities ==
- Orana Amphitheater
- Dwór Oruński (Kindergarten No. 9)
- National Center for Tatar Culture of the Republic of Poland and the Polish Tatar Monument
- Former stable building
- Music Scene GAK building
- 17th-century ice house

== Bibliography ==
- Samp, Jerzy (1992). Orunia. Historia-Zabytki-Kultura (in Polish). Gdańsk: Zrzeszenie Kaszubsko-Pomorskie. ISBN 83-85011-61-7.
