= Bus transport in Gdańsk =

Overview of buses in Gdańsk, Poland

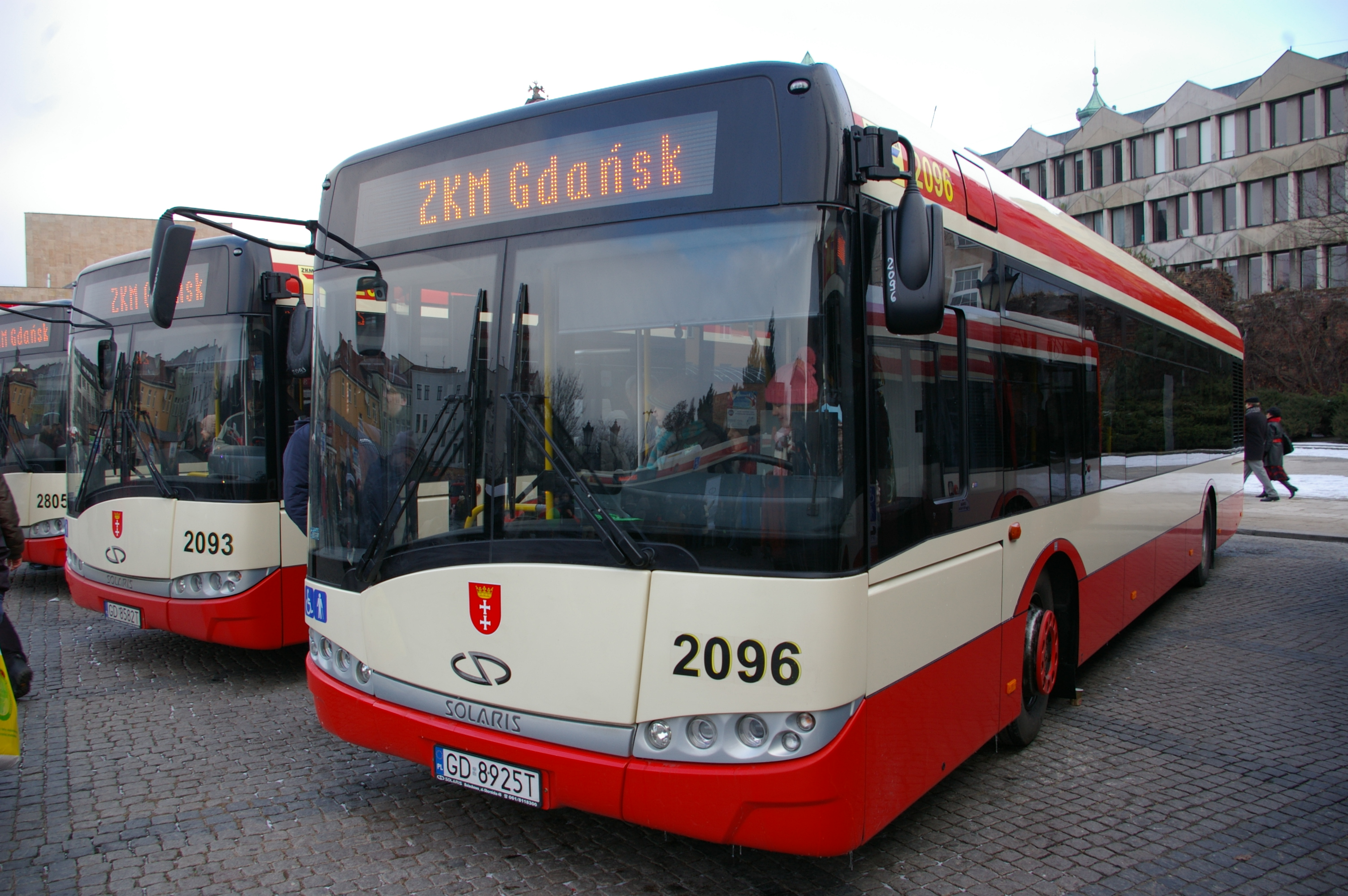
- A Solaris Urbino 12 operated by the city's bus transport agency

Overview
- Owner: Gdańskie Autobusy i Tramwaje
- Area served: Gdańsk and adjacent areas
- Transit type: Buses
- Number of lines: 76

Operation
- Began operation: 1912
- Number of vehicles: 292

Technical
- System length: 1,106 km (687 mi) (2014)
Network map
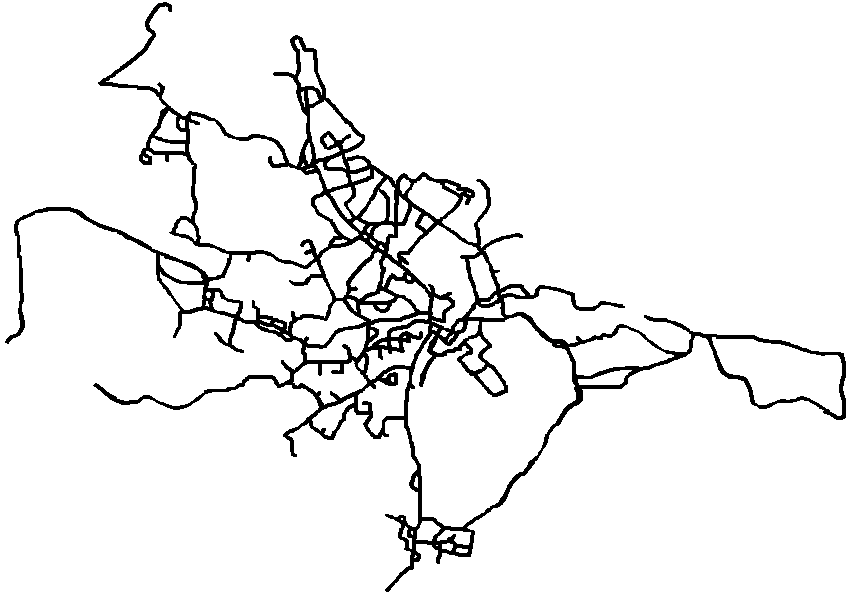

Buses have been present in the public transport network of the Polish city of Gdańsk since 1912. Today operated largely by Gdańskie Autobusy i Tramwaje, the city's bus network extends to several nearby areas and has a large fleet of vehicles.

== Network information ==
Currently, the bus network of Gdańsk consists of 76 regular routes, as well as 13 night routes and 1 seasonal route. Aside from Gdańsk, the city's buses also serve Sopot, Pruszcz Gdański, Gmina Pruszcz Gdański, Gmina Kolbudy, and Gmina Żukowo. As of 2014, the length of all lines totalled 1,106 km (687 mi).

== History ==
The first bus in Gdańsk (then known as Danzig), known as the "Auto Omnibus", began its service on 13 August 1912, between Danzig and Heubude. They became a stable component of the city's transport network after 1920, although their role was not significant, overshadowed by the city's trams and railways. Before Danzig became part of Poland, various private companies operated bus services, including Peters Autobus-Verkehr, Danziger Verkehrsgesellschaft mbH, and Danziger Elektrische Straßenbahn AG.

In June 1945, after the new Polish government took charge of the city, some irregular lines were set up using Dodge trucks and Büssing buses to Sopot and Gdynia, as well as more distant districts of the city of Gdańsk proper. The city's first post-war buses, Büssing D38s, were on the city's streets up to the late 1950s. After 1960, following the delivery of new buses built by Jelcz, new lines to Olszynka, Przymorze, and Osowa were opened. By the start of the 1970s, 22 bus lines and 116 bus stops were found in the city.

Beginning in the 1970s, the city's buses became more popular than its trams, which was accompanied by the construction of a new bus depot in 1978. In 1994, the first low-floor bus in Poland was introduced in Gdańsk, followed by the first city bus in Poland with air conditioning in 1997. In 2009, the last Ikarus buses were withdrawn from the fleet.

In 2019, a private company, Welcome Airport Services, began operating the first electric buses in Gdańsk. They were apron buses operating at Lech Wałęsa Airport. The first full electric city buses were rolled out in 2022, and in 2023, several hydrogen buses were ordered at a cost of 172 million zł. The buses were introduced to riders in 2024, although their purchase was controversial among the residents.

== Fleet ==
As of 2018, the city's fleet of buses consisted of the following vehicles:

Image	Name	Amount in fleet (2018)	Notes
	Mercedes-Benz O405	34	The first low-floor bus in Gdańsk, since retired
	Solaris Urbino 12	37	
	MAN NL 263 and 283	24	
	Neoplan N4007	3	Since retired
	MAN 469 NM222	2	Since retired
	Mercedes-Benz Citaro	15	
	MAN NG313	3	
	Solaris Urbino 18	44	
	Mercedes-Benz Conecto	22	
	Iveco 65C Urby	6	

=== Vehicles acquired since 2018 ===
Since 2018, the city has acquired the following vehicles:

Image	Name	Amount in fleet	Introduction	Notes
	Karsan e-Jest	3	2022	Operates only on one route
	MAN NL326 Lion's City 12 E	10	2023	
	MAN NG544 Lion's City 18 E	8	2023	
