= Chełm, Gdańsk =

Chełm
- District (dzielnica)
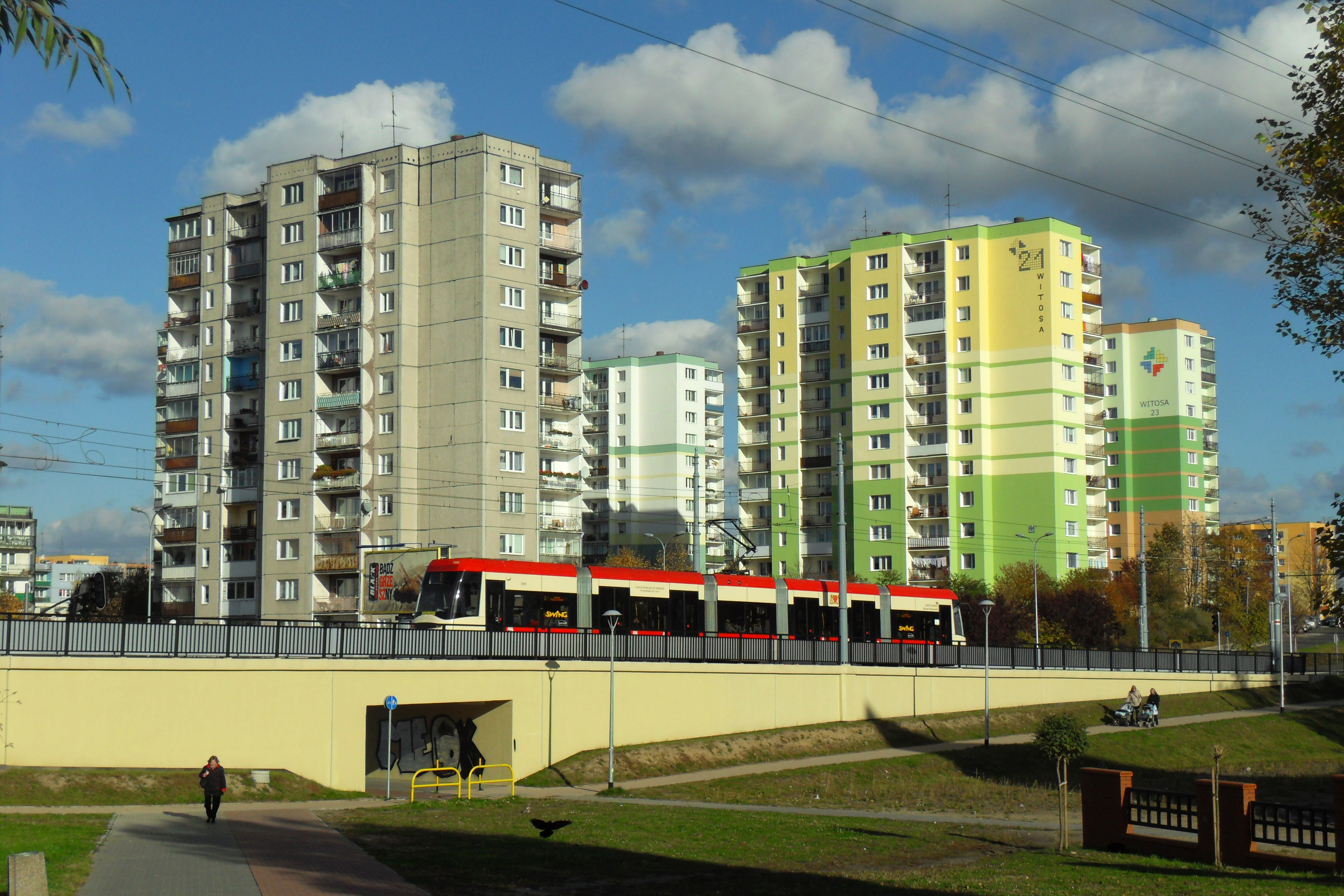
- Chełm

- Location of Chełm within Gdańsk
- Coordinates: 54°19′29″N 18°36′57″E
- Country: Poland
- Voivodeship: Pomeranian
- County/City: Gdańsk

Area
  - Total: 3.89 km^{2} (1.50 sq mi)

Population (2019)
  - Total: 32,242
  - Density: 8,290/km^{2} (21,500/sq mi)
- Time zone: UTC+1 (CET)
  - Summer (DST): UTC+2 (CEST)
- Area code: +48 58
- Vehicle registration: GD

Chełm (Polish pronunciation: [xɛwm]; German: Stolzenberg) is an administrative district (dzielnica administracyjna) of the city of Gdańsk, Poland. Although once the most populous district of the city, its size and population were significantly reduced from 2010 up until 2019 as new districts were separated from it.

== Location ==
From the north, the district is bordered by the districts of Siedlce and Śródmieście, from the east by Orunia-Św. Wojciech-Lipce, from the south by Orunia Górna-Gdańsk Południe and Ujeścisko-Łostowice and from the west by Wzgórze Mickiewicza. Currently, the quarters (osiedla) of Chełm are Stary Chełm and Nowy Chełm.

== History ==
What is today Chełm was initially part of the settlement of Górka, owned by the Bishop of Włocławek and centered around Biskupia Górka. The settlement of Nowa Górka was separated from Górka in 1356, slowly expanding with various episcopal orders. In 1518, the village's German name Stolzenberg was first mentioned. Two years later, in 1520, it was burnt down because of fighting amidst the Polish–Teutonic War of 1519–1521.

Nowa Górka was again destroyed during the Siege of Danzig (1577). After settlement was forbidden on Biskupia Górka, which was on one of the main roads to Gdańsk, the nearby areas, part of the village of Nowa Górka, grew rapidly. By the 17th century, more than 100 homes were present in the village. Nowa Górka became widely known for its production of ceramics.

Even as the city of Gdańsk continued making efforts to restrict Nowa Górka's growth, it continued its expansion. In 1655, it was burnt down once again during the Siege of Gdańsk (1655–1660). The Chełm-Gdańsk Cemetery, a large Jewish cemetery, was established in Nowa Górka in 1676 and the village was destroyed again in 1734, during the Siege of Danzig (1734) in the War of the Polish Succession. Nowa Górka, up until 1767, had been the property of the Roman Catholic Diocese of Włocławek, for which it had yielded significant profit.

Nowa Górka experienced significant population decline in the late 18th and early 19th centuries. In 1772, its population was 4,893, and by 1806, it had decreased to 2,657. During the Siege of Danzig in 1807, the town was once again destroyed and its population was decreased to 780. 6 years later, it was almost completely destroyed in the Siege of Danzig (1813) and became part of the city of Danzig in 1814.

In 1831, during the 1826–1837 cholera pandemic, some of the former cloister grounds in the city were repurposed into a cemetery for the disease's victims. In 1869, merely 116 people lived in Stolzenberg, which had grown to 493 by 1912. The next significant development occurred in 1940, with the construction of a new housing estate for shipyard workers. A subcamp of Stalag XX-B operated in the area during World War II.

After Poland regained control of the area in 1945, it was renamed to Pohulanka and then to Wysoka Góra before being given its current name of Chełm in 1949. Nowy Chełm, a new housing development, significantly expanded the district's population in the 1970s. Also in that decade, the district of Chełm i Gdańsk-Południe expanded to encompass several nearby villages, including Ujeścisko, Łostowice, and Jasień.

In 2010, the former villages of Ujeścisko and Łostowice were separated from Chełm i Gdańsk-Południe to form the district of Ujeścisko-Łostowice. In 2011, the former village of Jasień was separated to form the eponymous district. In 2019, Orunia Górna-Gdańsk Południe was also split from Chełm; thus, the district reached its final borders.

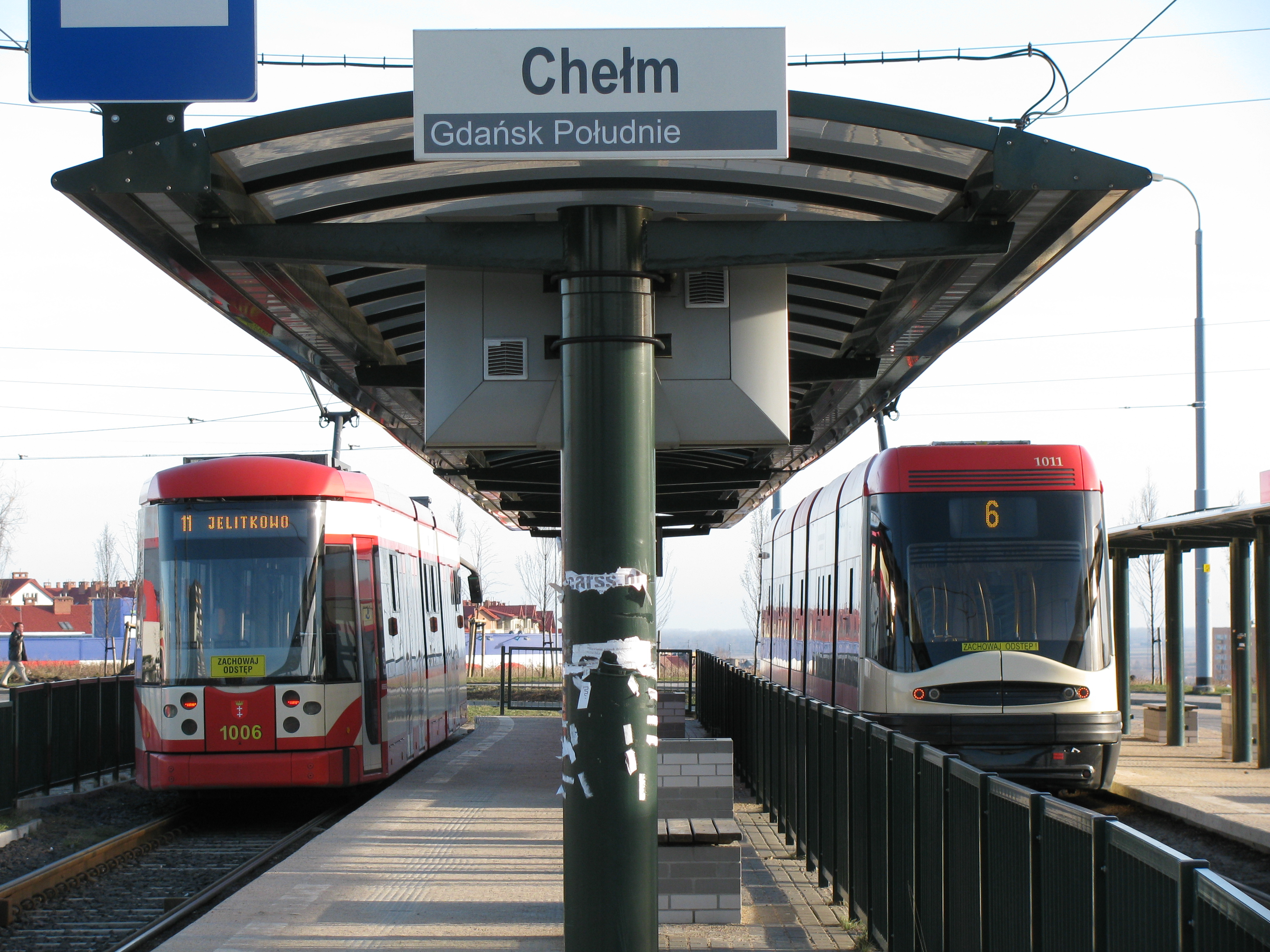
Chełm tram loop
