= Chełm i Gdańsk-Południe =

Chełm i Gdańsk Południe (Kashubian: Chołm ë Gduńsk Pôłnie; German: Stolzenberg und Danzig Süden) was an administrative district (dzielnica administracyjna) of the city of Gdańsk, Poland.

Between 2010 and 2019 it was divided into the districts of:

- Chełm
- Jasień
- Orunia Górna-Gdańsk Południe
- Ujeścisko-Łostowice
