= Stogi-Przeróbka =

Former district of Gdańsk, Poland

Stogi-Przeróbka (German: Heubude) was one of the administrative districts (Polish: dzielnica administracyjna) of Gdańsk, Poland. In 2011, the borough was divided into the districts Przeróbka and Stogi.
