= Gdańsk-Chełm Cemetery =

Jewish cemetery in Gdańsk, Poland

Coordinates: 54°22′N 18°36′E

The Gdansk-Chełm Cemetery (Polish: Cmentarz Żydowski Chełm-Gdańsk, German: Danzig-Stolzenberg) is a 2.3-hectare (5.7-acre) is one of Poland's oldest and most important Jewish cemeteries located in Gdańsk (Danzig), serving as burial ground for the Jewish community of Danzig since the late 16th century.

The cemetery survived the Holocaust times in good condition. The oldest preserved gravestone dates from 1786.

It was closed in 1956 and seriously devastated in the following years.The extent of the cemetery's post-war destruction was documented by eyewitnesses. A 1991 letter from a Gdańsk resident to the Jewish Historical Institute stated:

In 1968, when the communists chased the Jews, the robbery of the cemetery began. They came for granite and marble. They were stealing everything there was and what was possible to take. They even dug up bodies looking for gold. The cemetery was beautiful. There was a so-called mikweh to wash the dead, which 'went' first. Then the monuments and the slabs. Everything is overgrown with grass and covered with rubbish, dogs are walked to the cemetery.

Journalist Alicja Grzybiakówna provided additional context in Gazeta Gdańska, in 1991:

The cemetery was not only a burial place, but also a park. This is evidenced by traces of beautiful terraced structures, avenues. There were also fish ponds (....). There were also gilded, polychrome tombstones. The cemetery managed to survive the time of war and occupation. It was destroyed only after 1968, probably in 1975-1978. A bulldozer came and leveled the tombstones to the ground, destroying the drainage by the alley.

It remains in dilapidated condition. The land has been reclaimed by the Jewish community, which has roots in the community going back to at least 1694. The International Jewish Cemetery Project of the International Association of Jewish Genealogical Societies is tracking its restoration.
