= Orunia-Św. Wojciech-Lipce =

District of Gdańsk, Poland

Coordinates: 54°19′33″N 18°38′00″E

- District (dzielnica)
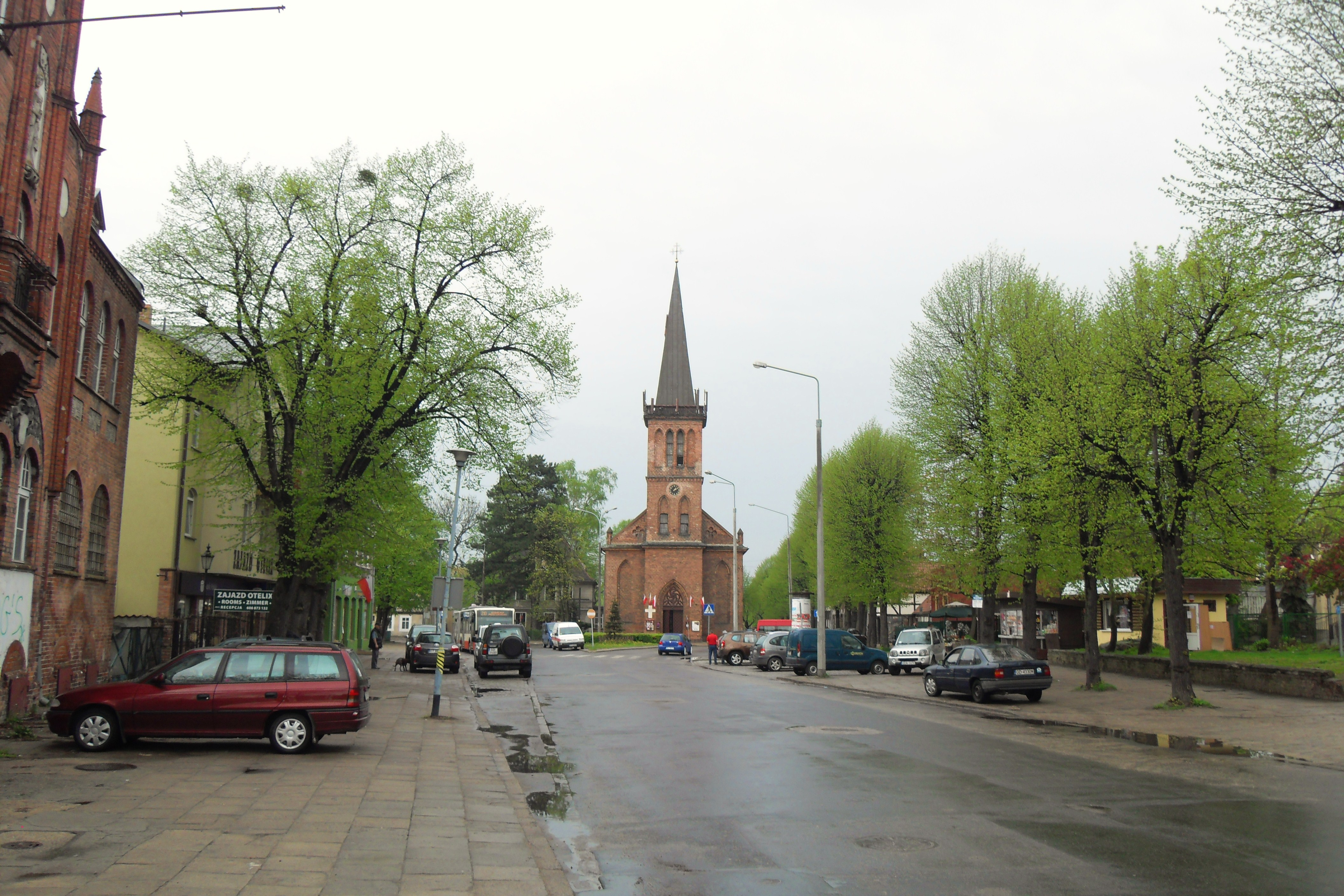
- Church of Saint Don Bosco on Gościnna Street

- Location of Orunia-Św. Wojciech-Lipce within Gdańsk
- Country: Poland
- Voivodeship: Pomeranian
- City: Gdańsk

Area
  - Total: 19.66 km^{2} (7.59 sq mi)

Population
  - Total: 12,705
  - Density: 646.2/km^{2} (1,674/sq mi)
- Postal code: 80-0XX
- Area code(s): 58
- Vehicle registration: GD

Orunia-Św. Wojciech-Lipce (German: Ohra-Sankt Albrecht-Guteherberge; Kashubian: Òruniô-Sw. Wòjcech-Lëpicz), also known as simply Orunia, is one of the quarters of the city of Gdańsk, Poland.

== Location ==
Orunia-Św. Wojciech-Lipce borders Śródmieście to the north, Olszynka to the east, Gmina Pruszcz Gdański to the south, and Chełm, as well as Orunia Górna-Gdańsk Południe, to the west. It consists of the quarters (osiedla) of Orunia, Oruńskie Przedmieście, Lipce, Św. Wojciech, Stare Szkoty, and Niegowo.

== History ==
Orunia was initially a small village on the Orunia Stream, a stream flowing into the Motława. Once the Radunia Canal was completed in the 14th century, it began steadily growing. It was first mentioned in 1356, and was burnt down in 1433 during the Hussite expedition to the Baltic. In 1454, the village was granted to Gdańsk by Kazimierz Jagiellończyk. The same year, as well as in 1461, it was burnt down by the Teutonic Knights.

Orunia was destroyed in 1520 during a siege, and again during another siege in 1577. It was destroyed by the Swedish twice, in 1627 and 1656. It became home to the headquarters of Burkhard Christoph von Münnich during the siege of 1734. It was there that Gdańsk signed its act of surrender. A notable feature of this area was the manor of the family of Arthur Schopenhauer.

The village suffered during the Napoleonic Wars, in 1807 and 1813, and in 1852, a railway was built in Orunia, known in German as Ohra. The area's population grew, composed mostly of various agricultural workers. By 1885, 5,713 people lived in Ohra. Its population continued growing; by 1924, 12,500 people lived in Ohra, which was now in the Free City of Danzig.

Orunia did not suffer any outstandingly significant damage during World War II, and much of its 19th- and 20th-century architecture survives to this day. Because of this, new development was limited and the agricultural, economically vulnerable area fell into poverty. To this day, Orunia is known as one of Gdańsk's impoverished districts, being nicknamed a district of "flying knives" due to its high crime rate.

== Gallery ==
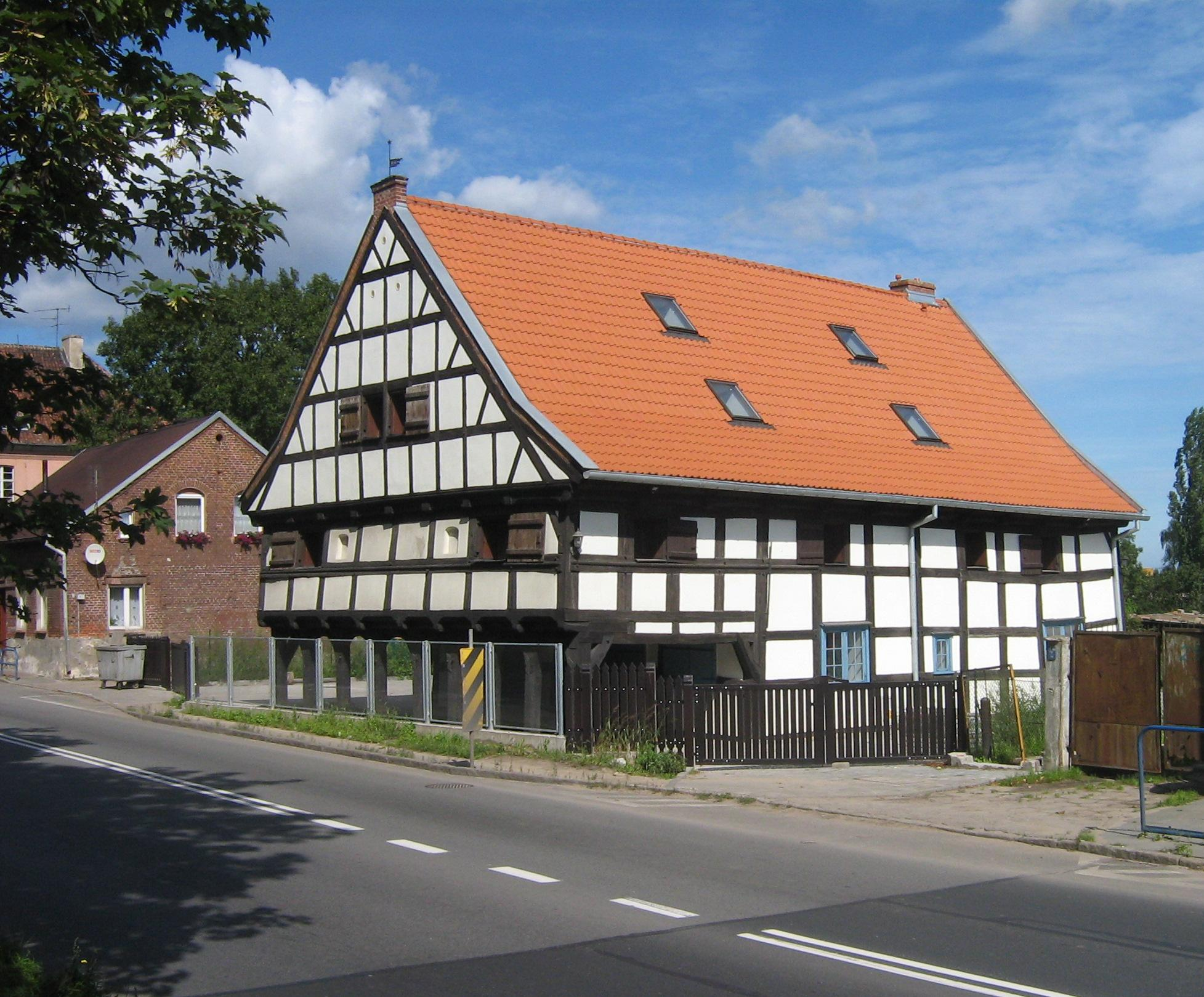
A traditional farmhouse in Lipce

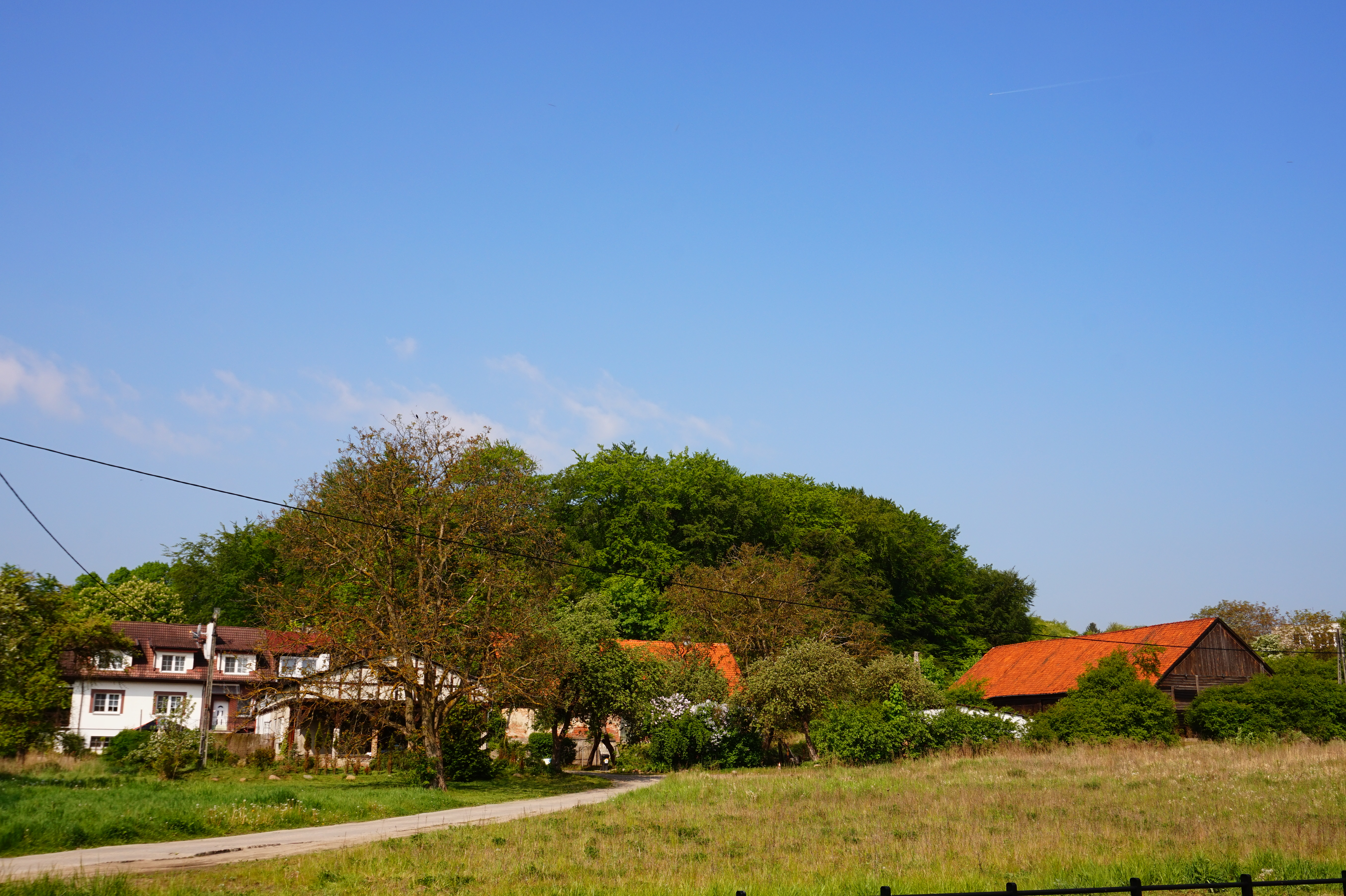
A collection of houses in Orunia

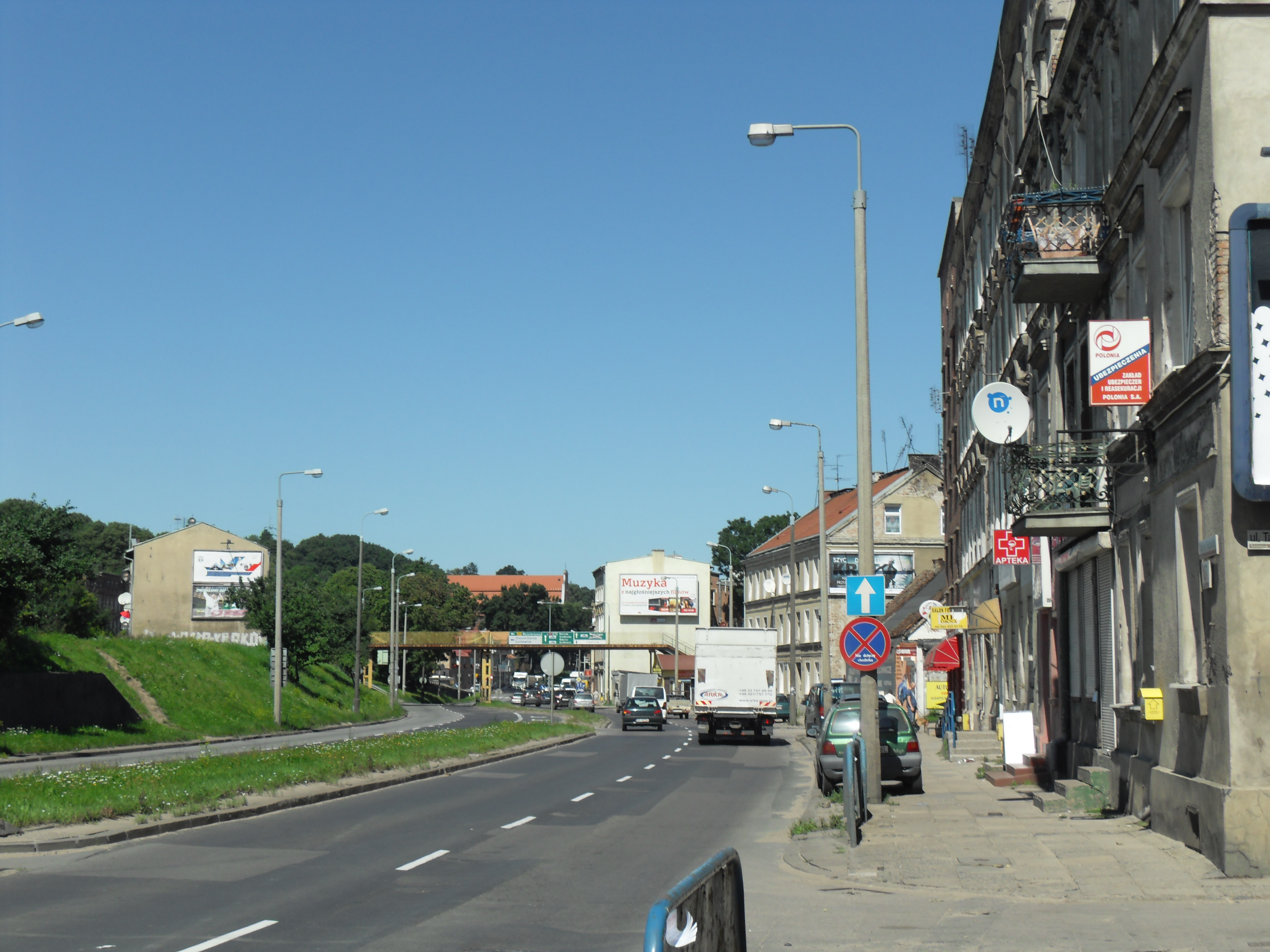
The district's main thoroughfare

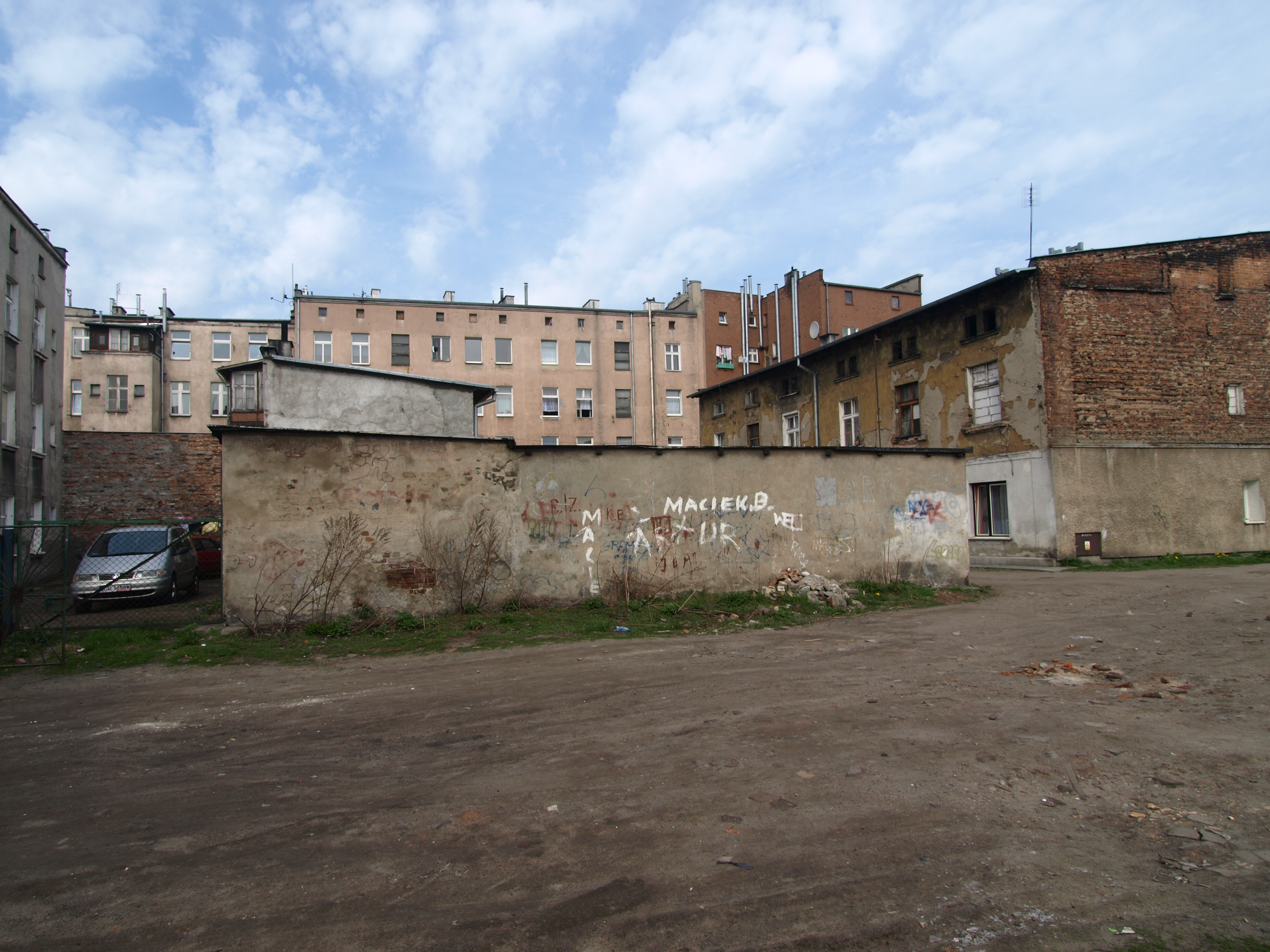
Decrepit buildings
