= Jasień, Gdańsk =

Jasień
- District (dzielnica)
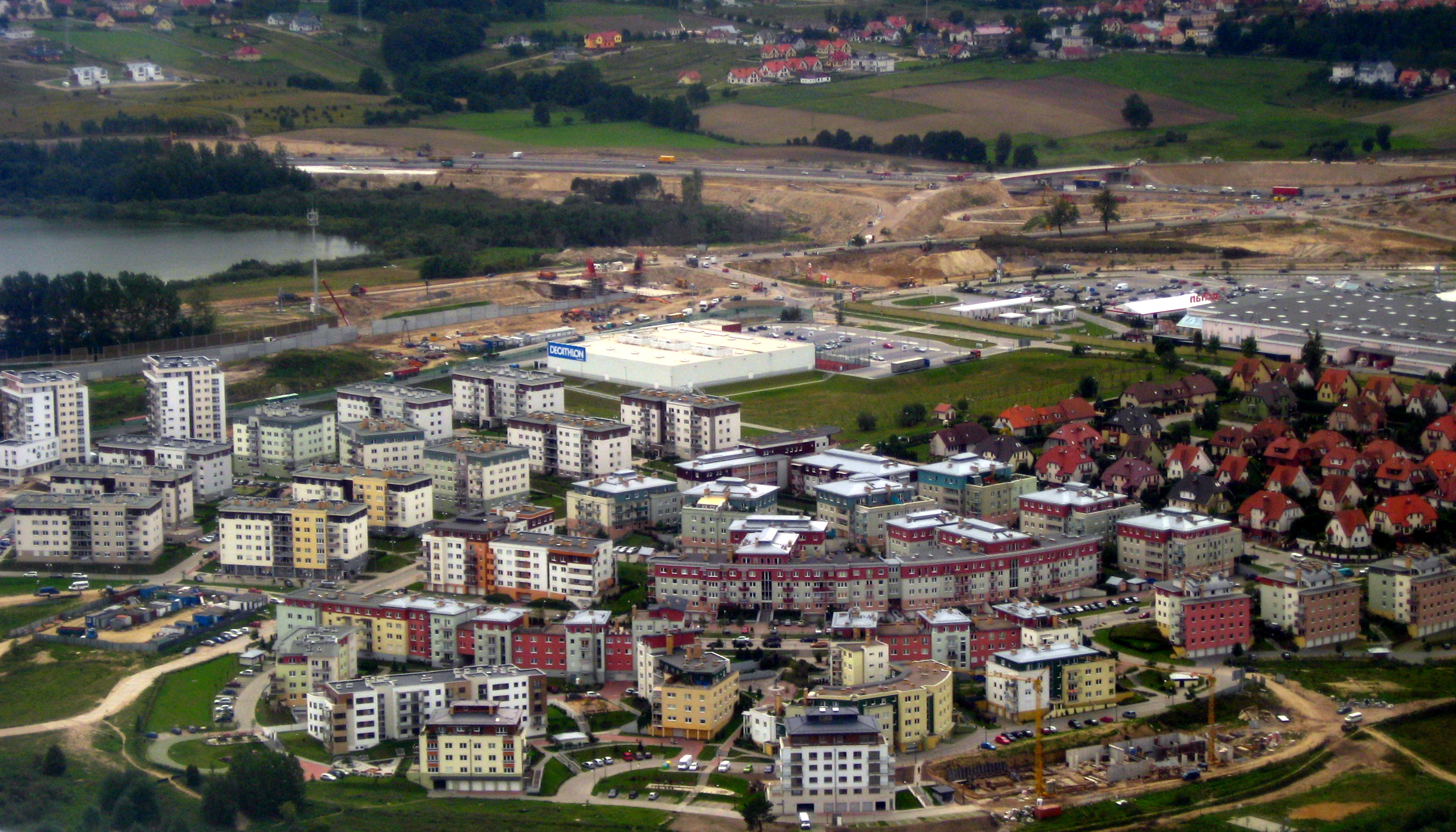
- Jasień

- Location of Jasień within Gdańsk
- Coordinates: 54°22′0″N 18°38′0″E
- Country: Poland
- Voivodeship: Pomeranian
- County/City: Gdańsk
- First mentioned: 1284
- Within city limits: 1973

Area
  - Total: 11.483 km^{2} (4.434 sq mi)

Population (2019)
  - Total: 18,014
  - Density: 1,568.8/km^{2} (4,063.1/sq mi)
- Time zone: UTC+1 (CET)
  - Summer (DST): UTC+2 (CEST)
- Area code: +48 58

Jasień (Polish pronunciation: [ˈjaɕɛɲ]; Kashubian: Nënczi or Nënkòwë; German: Nenkau) is a district (dzielnica) of the city of Gdańsk, Poland, located in the southern part of the city, established in 2011.

== Location ==
From the north, the district is bordered by Matarnia, Brętowo and Piecki-Migowo, from the east by Ujeścisko-Łostowice, from the south by Gmina Kolbudy, and from the west by Kokoszki.

== History ==
The settlement was first mentioned in 1284 as Gnanowo and from 1615 on as Nenkaw/Nenkau. In 1284, it was granted by Mestwin II, Duke of Pomerania to a knight named Piotr. The village repeatedly changed hands during the 14th and 15th centuries during the Polish–Teutonic Wars, eventually becoming a royal village of the Polish crown. From 1648 onwards, it belonged to the royal properties of Kiełpino.

It was annexed by Prussia in the First Partition of Poland in 1772, and from 1807 until 1814, it was part of the Napoleonic Free City of Danzig. In 1874, Nenkau was included incorporated into the Kelpin (Kiełpino) court district. As of 1880, Nenkau was inhabited by 270 people and there were establishments such as taverns and brickyards, accompanied by 20 farms.

After World War I, Nenkau became part of the Free City of Danzig. As of 1924, 210 people lived there. A a park, a forge, a school, and a slaughterhouse were also present in the settlement. After World War II, when the area became again part of Poland, the name was changed to Nenkowo and in 1954, the village adopted its current name, which refers to the name of a former owner, F.J. Jasieński.

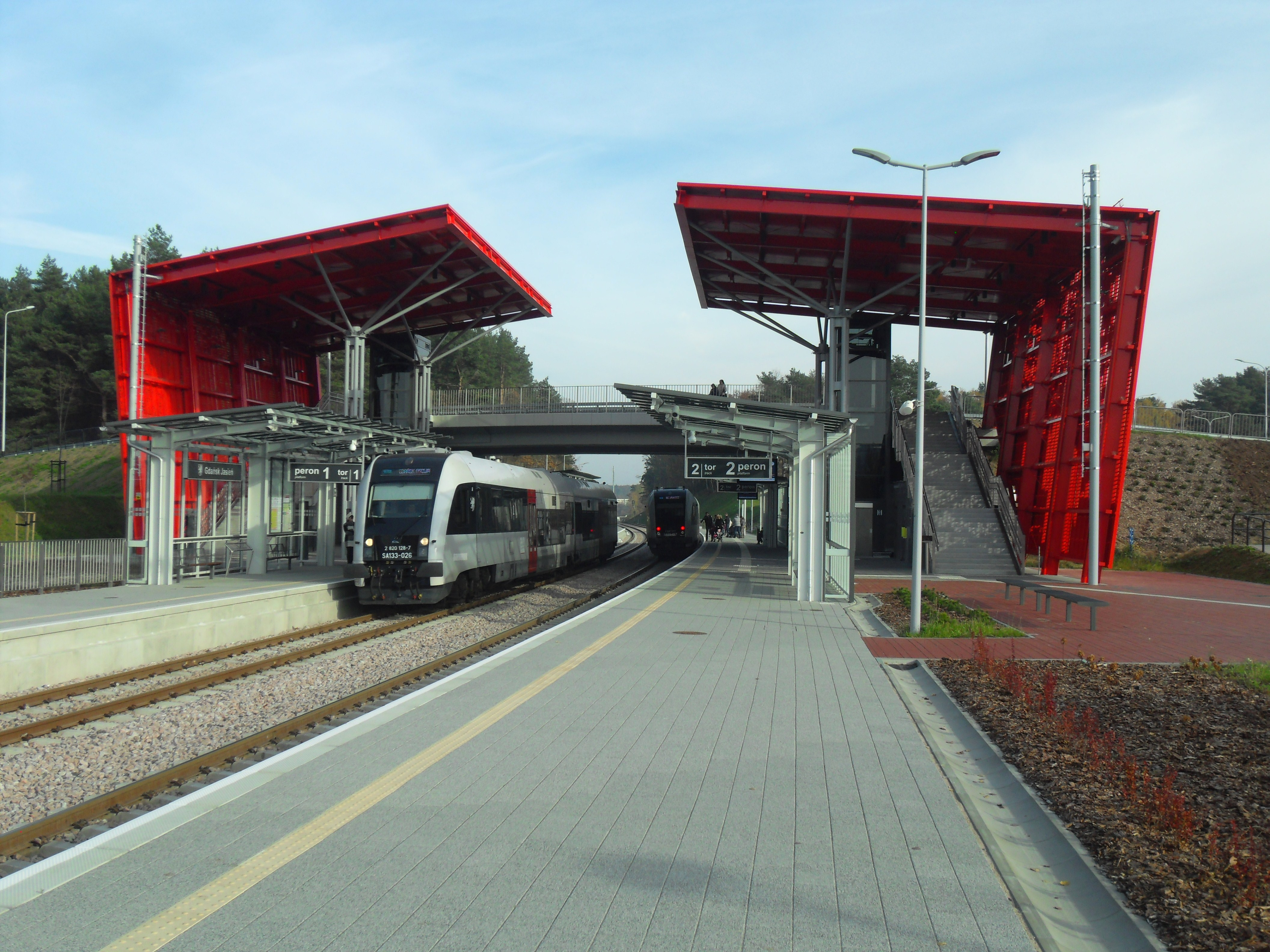
Gdańsk Jasień railway station

Jasień became part of the city of Gdańsk on January 1, 1973, along with several other villages. From 1992 to 2010, it was part of the district of Chełm i Gdańsk Południe until it was separated into its own district. In 2011, the former settlements of Kiełpinek, Rębowo and Szadółki were incorporated into the district of Jasień. Jasień gained district status in 2013. The Jasień Reservoir was created in 2014. The Gdańsk Jasień railway station on the Gdańsk Wrzeszcz–Gdańsk Osowa railway was opened in Jasień in September 2015.
