= Olszynka =

Coordinates: 54°20′10″N 18°40′02″E

- District (dzielnica)
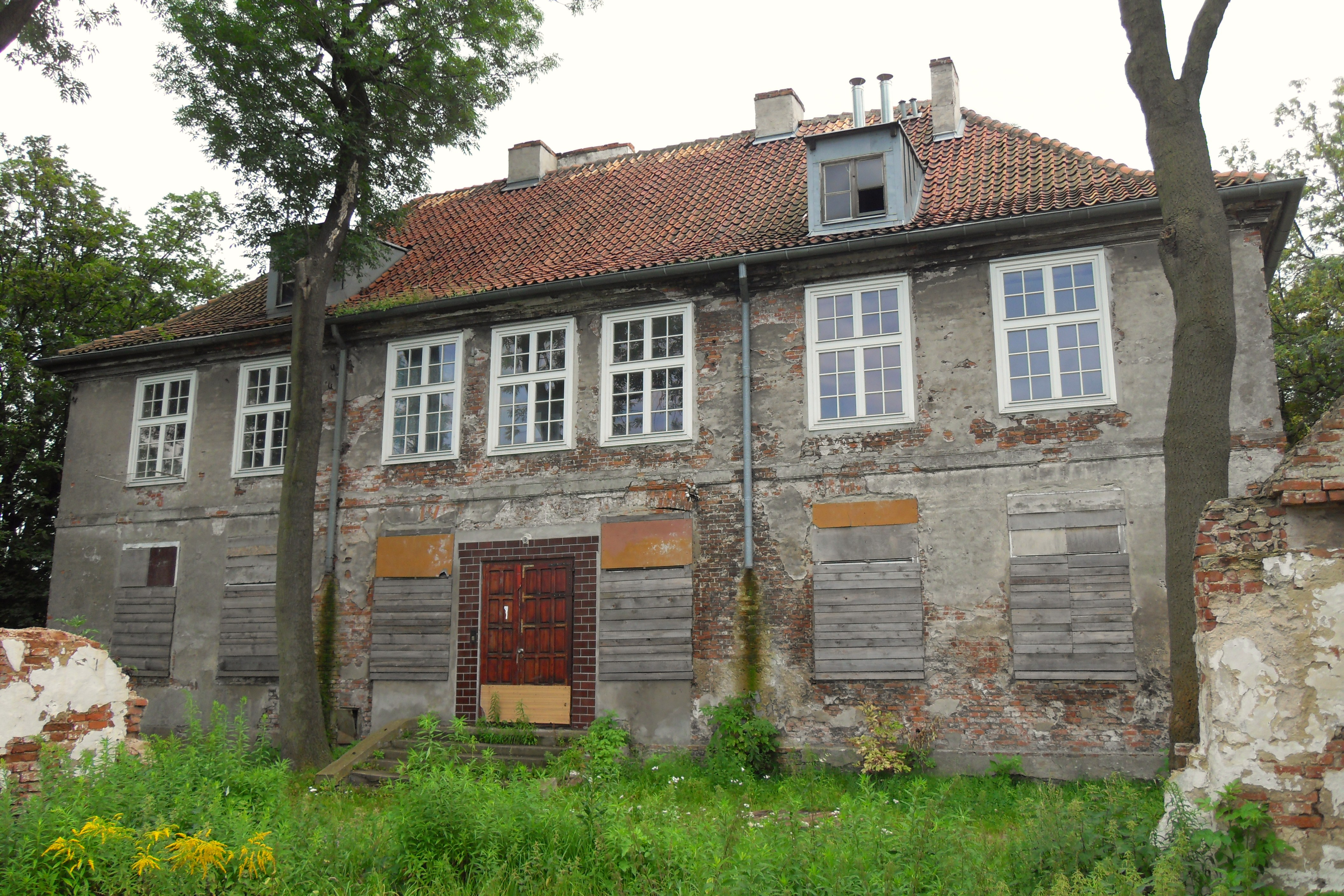
- The historic Olszynka Manor House

- Location of Olszynka within Gdańsk
- Country: Poland
- Voivodeship: Pomeranian
- City: Gdańsk

Area
  - Total: 7.85 km^{2} (3.03 sq mi)

Population
  - Total: 2,856
  - Density: 364/km^{2} (942/sq mi)

Olszynka (German: Walddorf; Kashubian: Òlszinka) is one of the districts of the city of Gdańsk. It is located in the city's southeast.

== Location ==
Olszynka borders Rudniki to the east, Śródmieście to the north, Orunia-Św. Wojciech-Lipce to the west, and Gmina Pruszcz Gdański to the south. Its quarters (osiedla) are Olszynka Mała and Olszynka Wielka. It is located entirely on the low-lying Vistula Fens.

== History ==
The area which is today known as Olszynka was initially a dense forest, given to the city of Danzig by the Teutonic State in the second half of the 14th century and named the Bürgerwald (City Forest). The area was rapidly deforested, and in 1618, it was divided into Groß Walddorf and Klein Walddorf, later known as Olszynka Wielka and Olszynka Mała respectively.

The first households to inhabit what is today Olszynka came in c. 1640. The area quickly experienced population growth, which was occasionally interrupted by war. As of 1793, Klein Walddorf had 253 inhabitants, and Groß Walddorf had 216. In 1802, the Olszynka Manor House was constructed. It became a major local employer and remains the area's most notable attraction.

Both Klein and Groß Walddorf experienced significant population loss after the Napoleonic Wars; in 1819, Klein Walddorf had 189 inhabitants, and Groß Walddorf had 99. The population gradually recovered throughout the 19th century, meeting and surpassing its pre-1800 levels by the 1870s. The city's industrial railways were built in the district in the early 20th century. Groß Walddorf rapidly outpaced Klein Walddorf in population over the next years.

In 1933, the two villages were incorporated as one into the borders on Gdańsk as the district of Bürgerwalde. When the area became part of Poland in 1945, the district was renamed Olszynka. Because of later construction work, Olszynka became well-connected to the rest of the city by bridges and later the Obwodnica Trójmiejska.

== Gallery ==
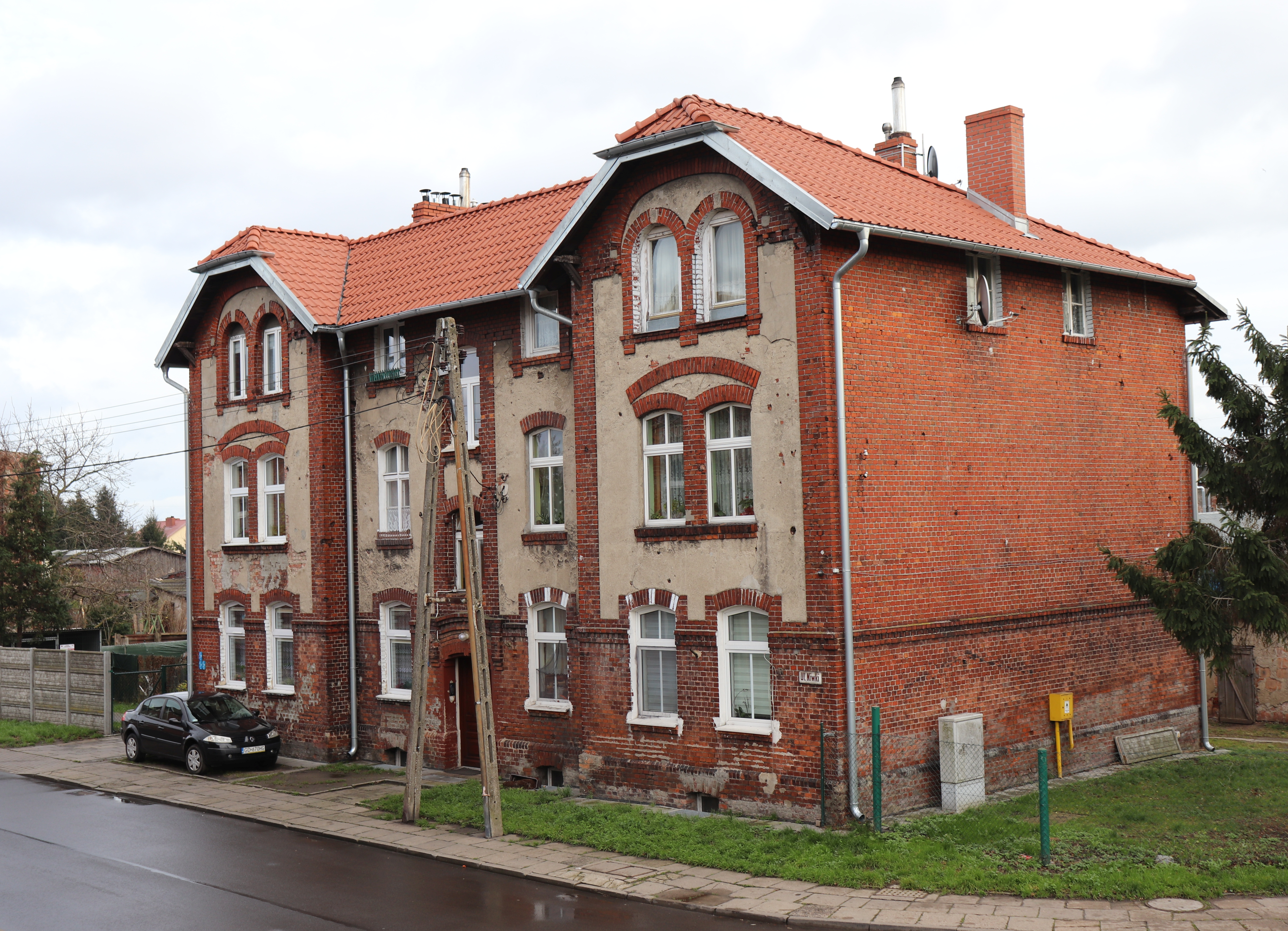
Old townhouses in Olszynka

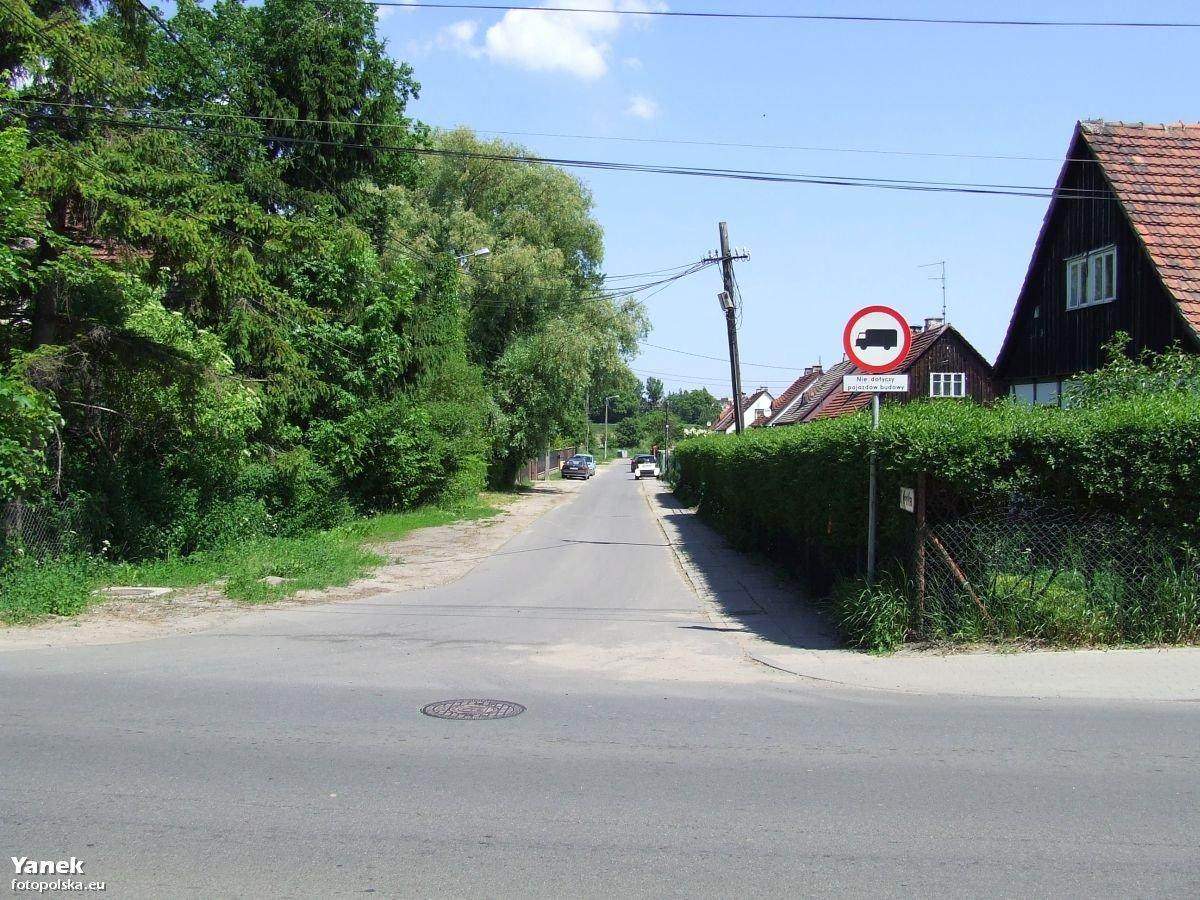
A single-lane road

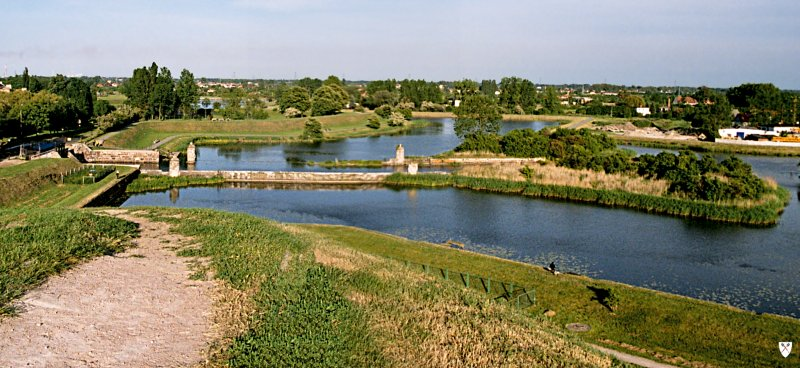
The Śluza Kamienna, a local lock

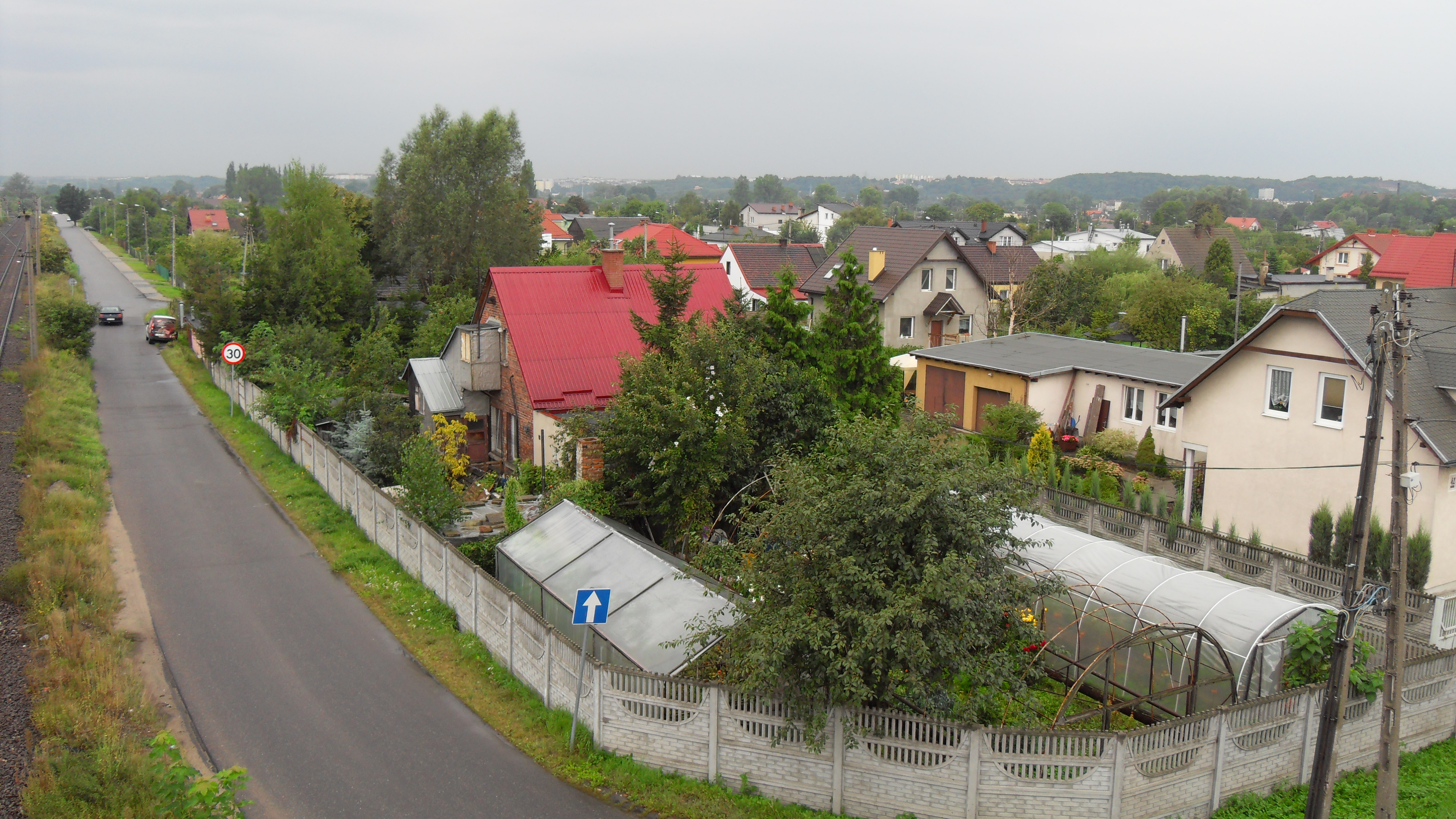
A concentration of houses
