= Stogi, Gdańsk =

Stogi
- District (dzielnica)
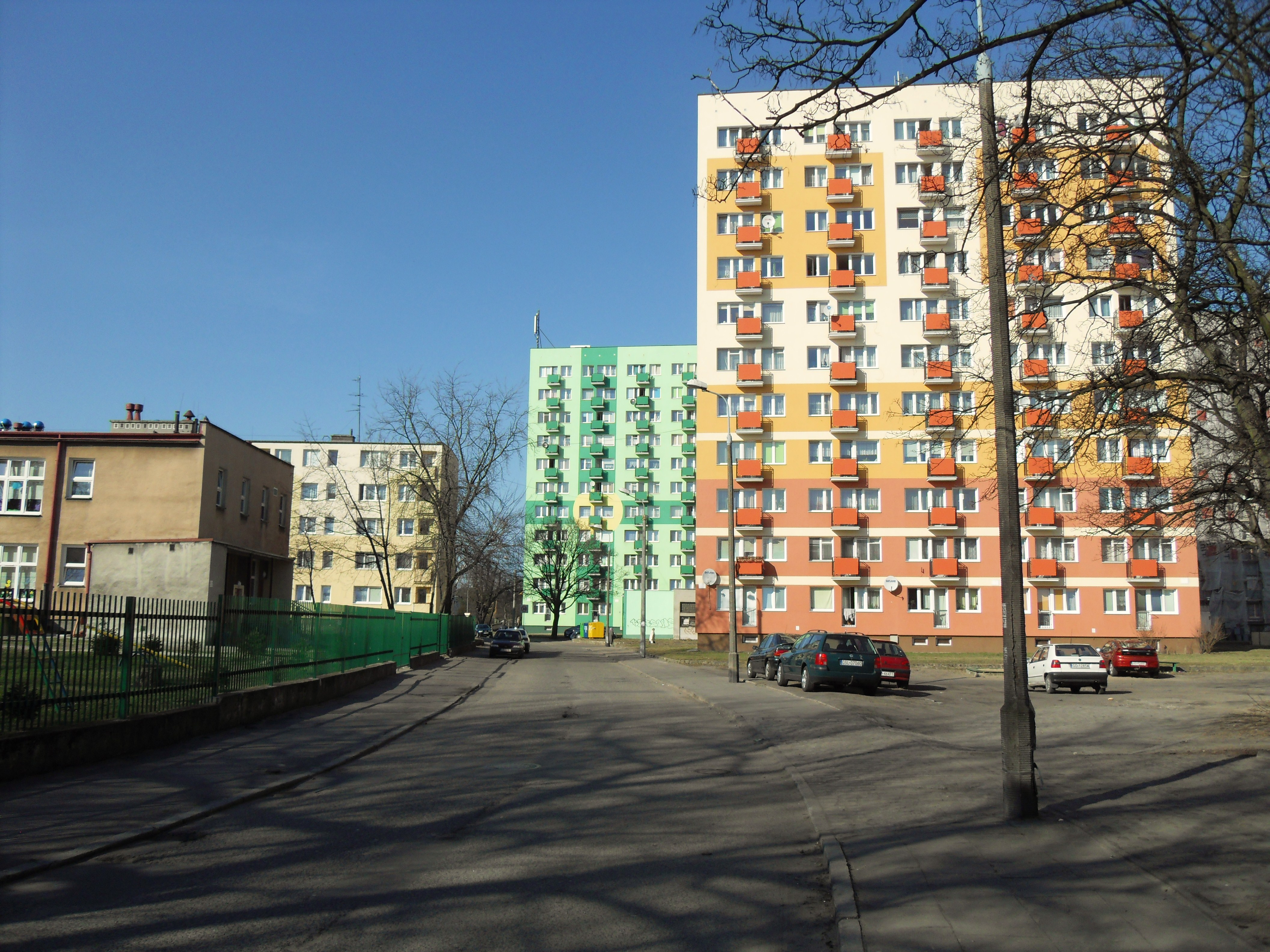
- Apartment blocks in Stogi

- Location of Stogi within Gdańsk
- Coordinates: 54°22′08″N 18°42′32″E
- Country: Poland
- Voivodeship: Pomeranian
- County/City: Gdańsk

Area
  - Total: 10.91 km^{2} (4.21 sq mi)

Population (2019)
  - Total: 9,375
  - Density: 859.3/km^{2} (2,226/sq mi)
- Time zone: UTC+1 (CET)
  - Summer (DST): UTC+2 (CEST)
- Area code: +48 58

Stogi (German: Heubude) is one of the administrative districts (dzielnica administracyjna) of the city of Gdańsk, Poland. The district is located on the central part of the Port Island (Wyspa Portowa).

== Location ==
Stogi is bounded to the north by the Bay of Gdańsk and to the south by the Martwa Wisła. Administratively, it borders Krakowiec-Górki Zachodnie to the east, Rudniki to the south, and Przeróbka to the west. It is not divided into any quarters (osiedla).

== History ==
Stogi was initially a village, under the ownership of various entities and groups of people. It was modestly built-up and granted by Polish king Kazimierz Jagiellończyk to Gdańsk in 1454. It was primarily focused on agriculture and fishing. Its population grew significantly during the 19th century; as of 1820, only 561 people lived there, but by 1910, that amount had increased to 3,114. Despite occasional efforts of reforestation, the forests of Stogi, known in German as Heubude, were repeatedly exploited or destroyed.

In 1914, the village of Heubude became part of the larger nearby city of Danzig. As of 1927, about 5,000 people lived there. From 31 March to 6 April 1945, intense urban warfare took place in Heubude, destroying much of it. It was rebuilt, with a large port being constructed, the Northern Port (Port Północny). For much of its history, Stogi has been known for its beaches; it has been a location for public sea bathing since 1884, and remains a local beach destination to this day.

== Gallery ==
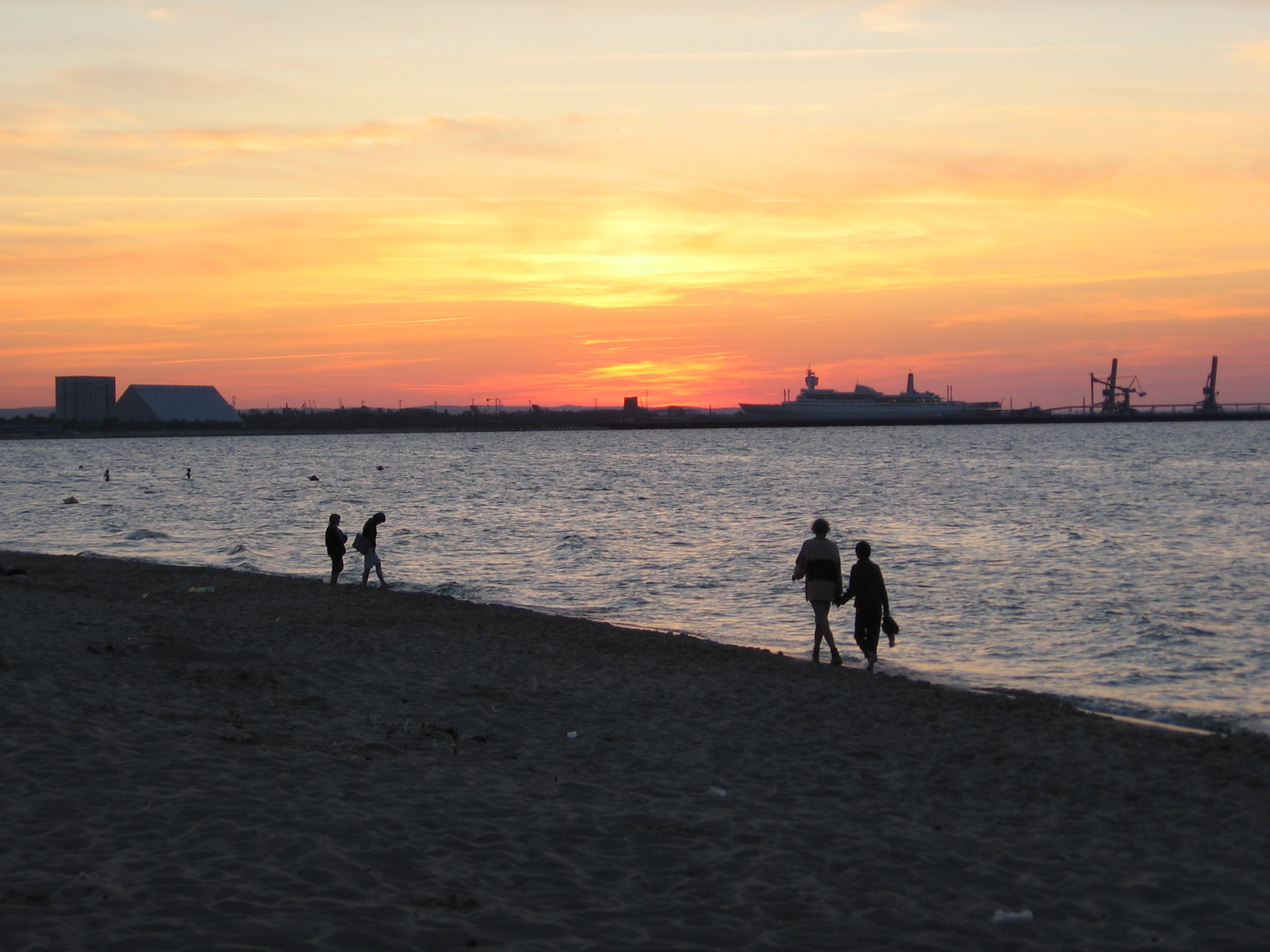
Stogi Beach and the Northern Port (Port Północny)

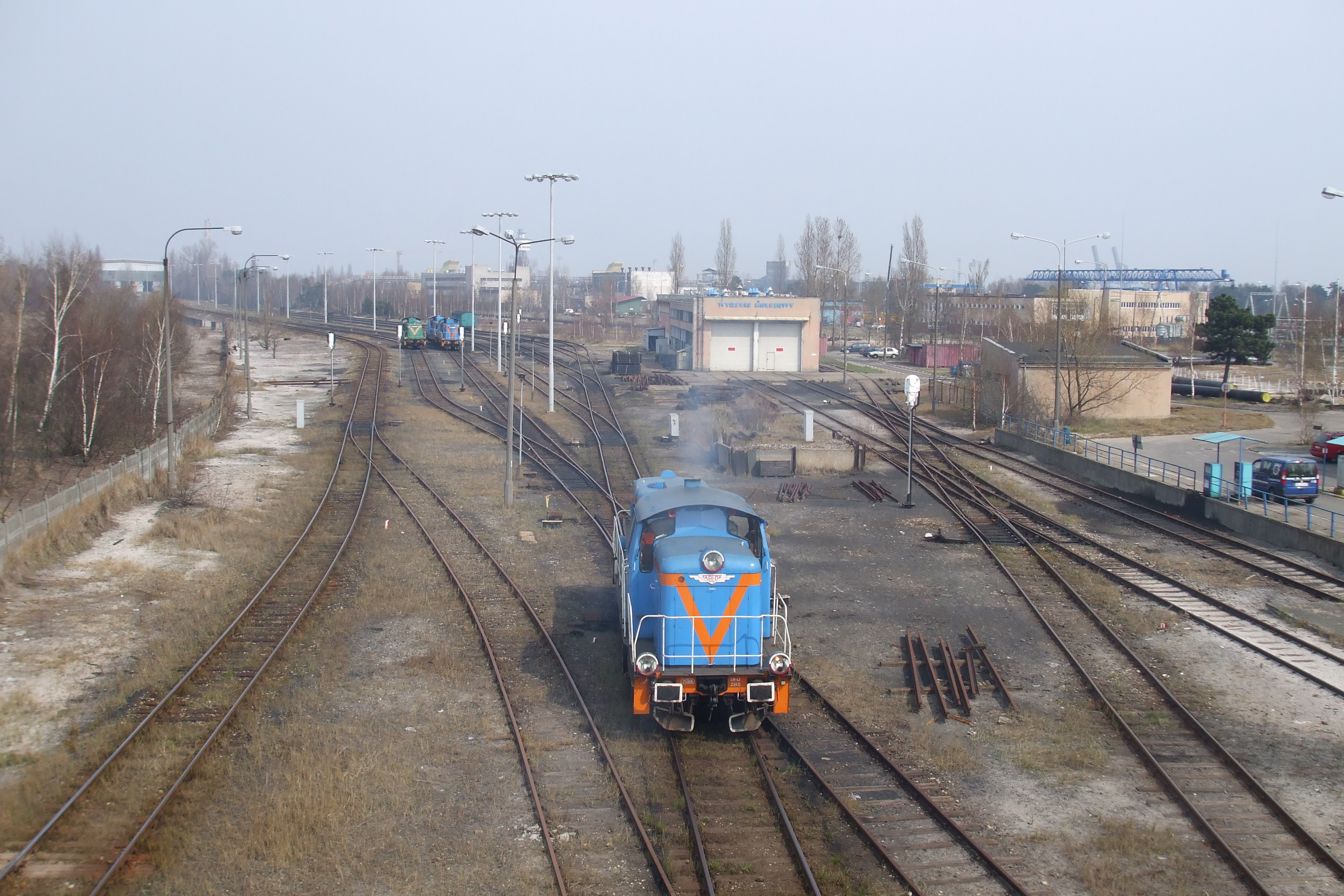
Railyards in Stogi

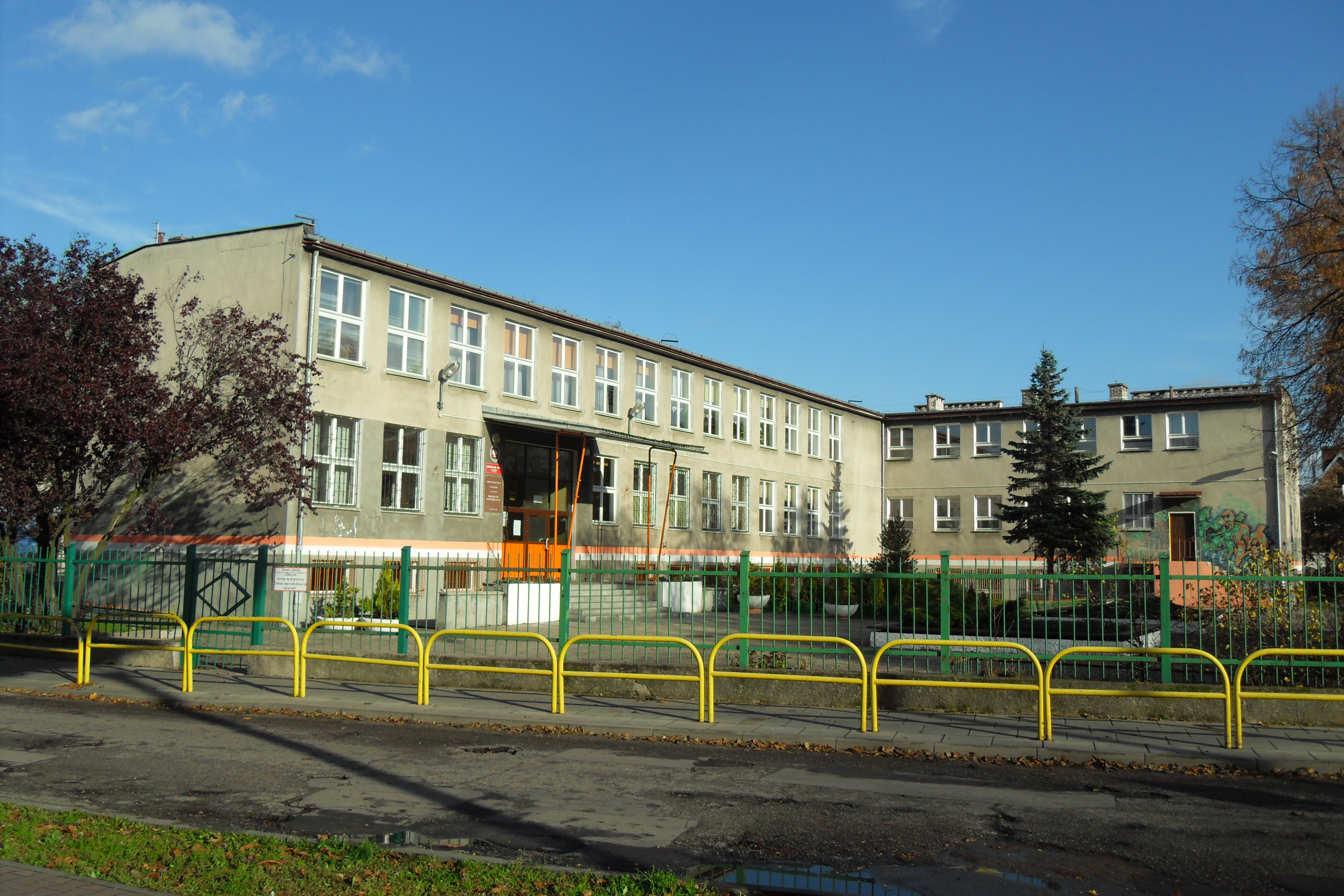
School building

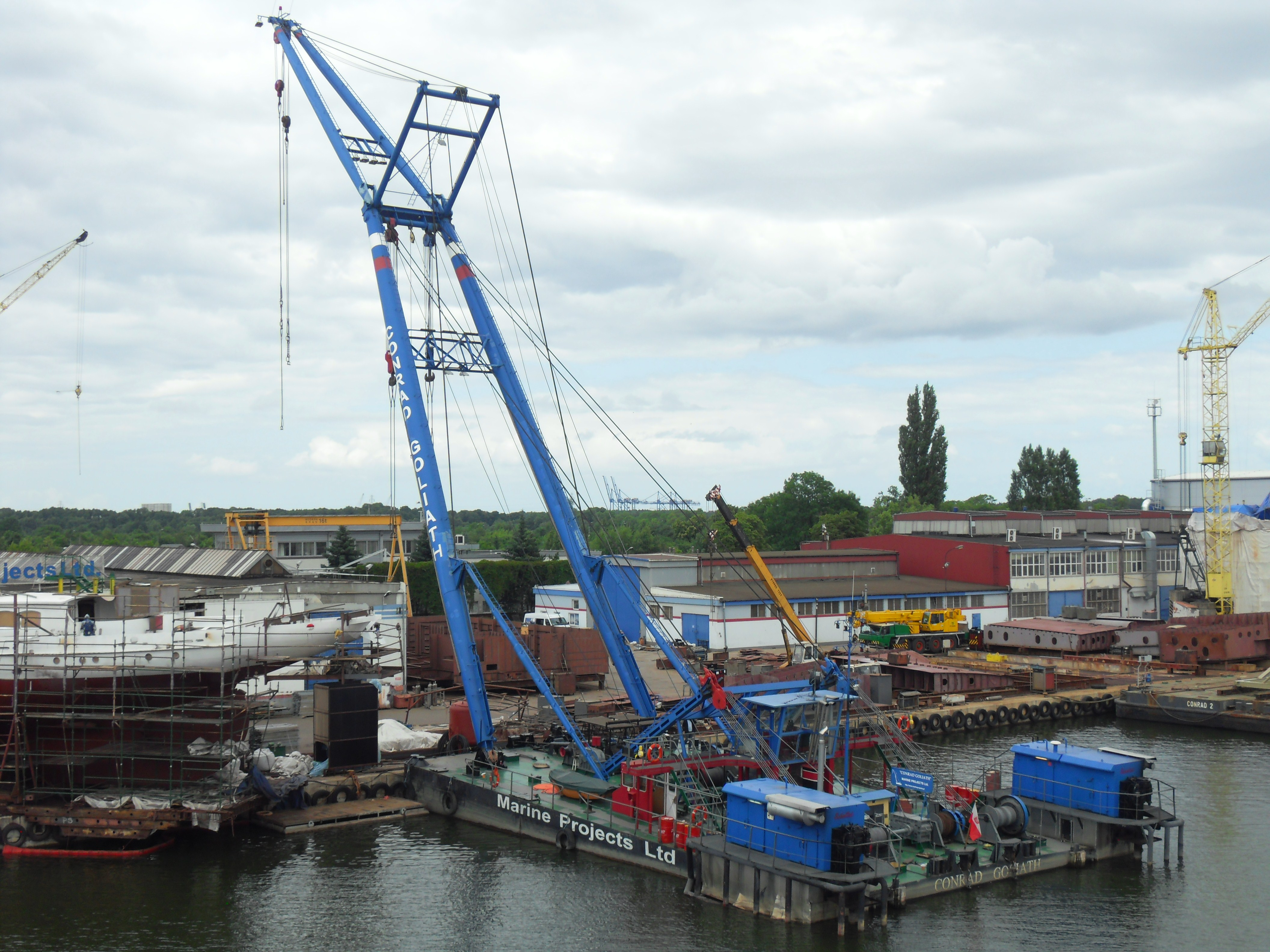
Shipyard infrastructure
