= Orunia Górna-Gdańsk Południe =

- District (dzielnica)
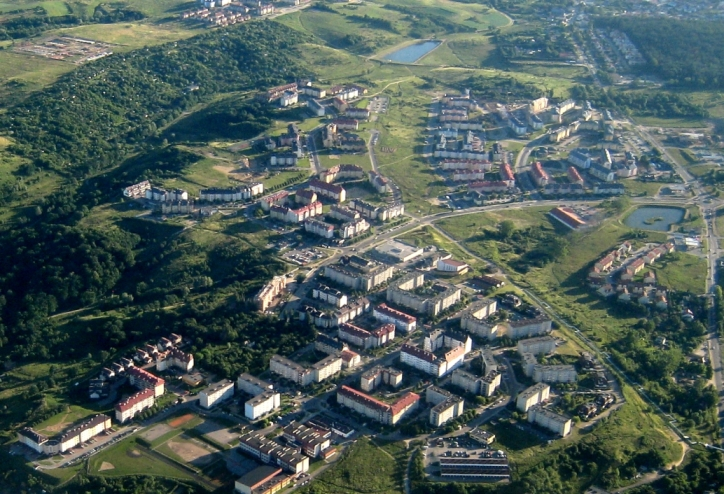
- Bird's eye view of Orunia Górna

- Location of Orunia Górna-Gdańsk Południe within Gdańsk
- Coordinates: 54°19′29″N 18°37′06″E
- Country: Poland
- Voivodeship: Pomeranian
- County/City: Gdańsk

Area
  - Total: 7.2 km^{2} (2.8 sq mi)

Population (2019)
  - Total: 19,807
  - Density: 2,800/km^{2} (7,100/sq mi)
- Time zone: UTC+1 (CET)
  - Summer (DST): UTC+2 (CEST)
- Area code: +48 58

Orunia Górna-Gdańsk Południe is the 35th and youngest of the administrative districts (dzielnica administracyjna) of the city of Gdańsk, Poland. It is of a suburban character.

== Location ==
From the north, the district is bordered by Chełm, from the east by Orunia-Św. Wojciech-Lipce, from the south by Pruszcz Gdański and Kolbudy, and from the west by Ujeścisko-Łostowice. It consists of the quarters (osiedla) of Łostowice, Maćkowy, Orunia Górna, Osiedle Cztery Pory Roku, Osiedle Moje Marzenie, and Osiedle Kolorowe.

== History ==
The district of Orunia Górna-Gdańsk Południe is very young, and much of its history before 2018 can be found at Chełm, Gdańsk § History and Orunia-Św. Wojciech-Lipce § History. In 2018, the initiative of a few Chełm district councillors first filed in 2016 succeeded in greenlighting the creation of a new district, in Chełm's southern area. On 30 August, it was formally approved by the Gdańsk city council, and the district came into existence on 24 March 2019.

== Gallery ==
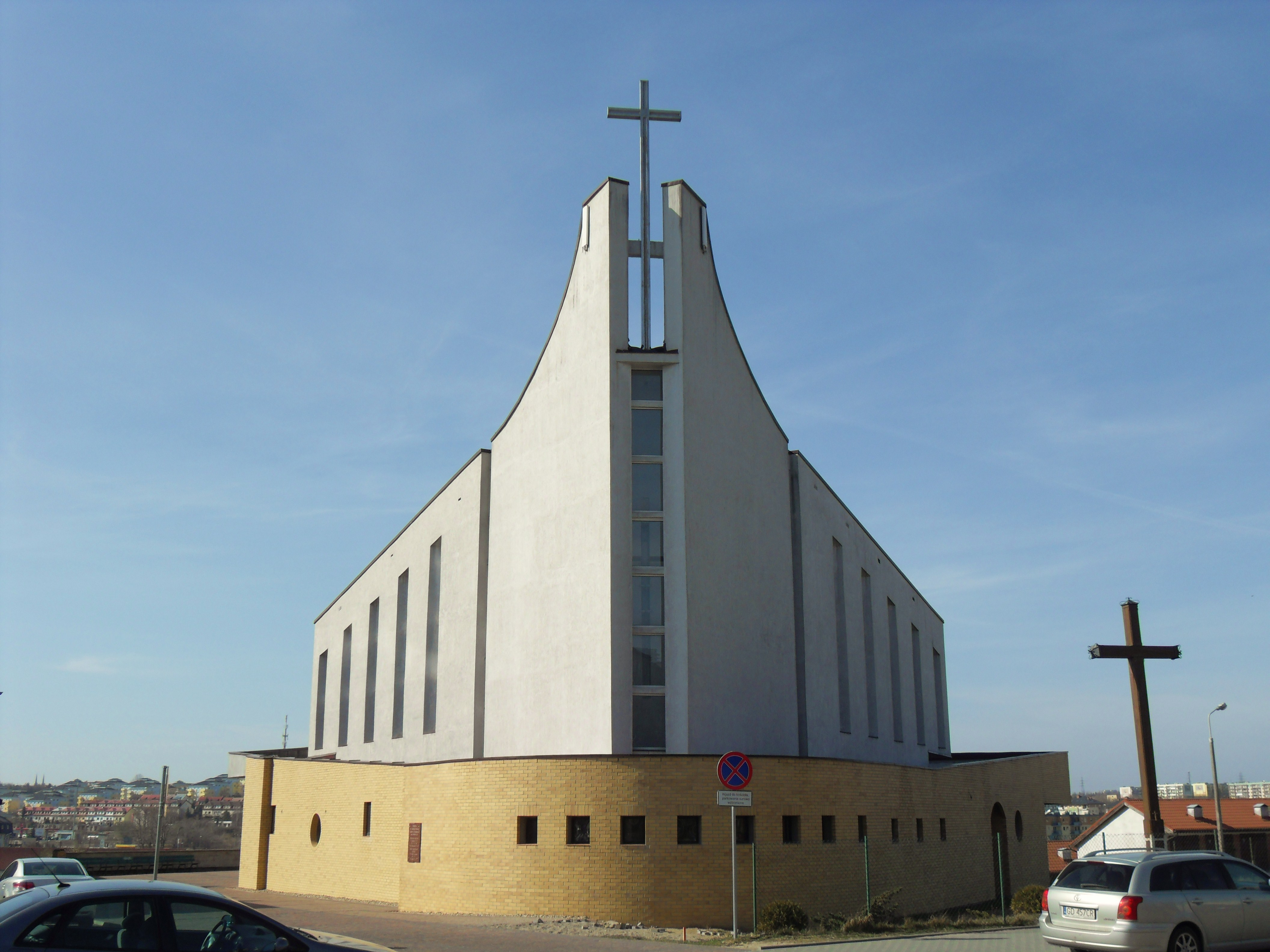
St. Jadwiga's Church

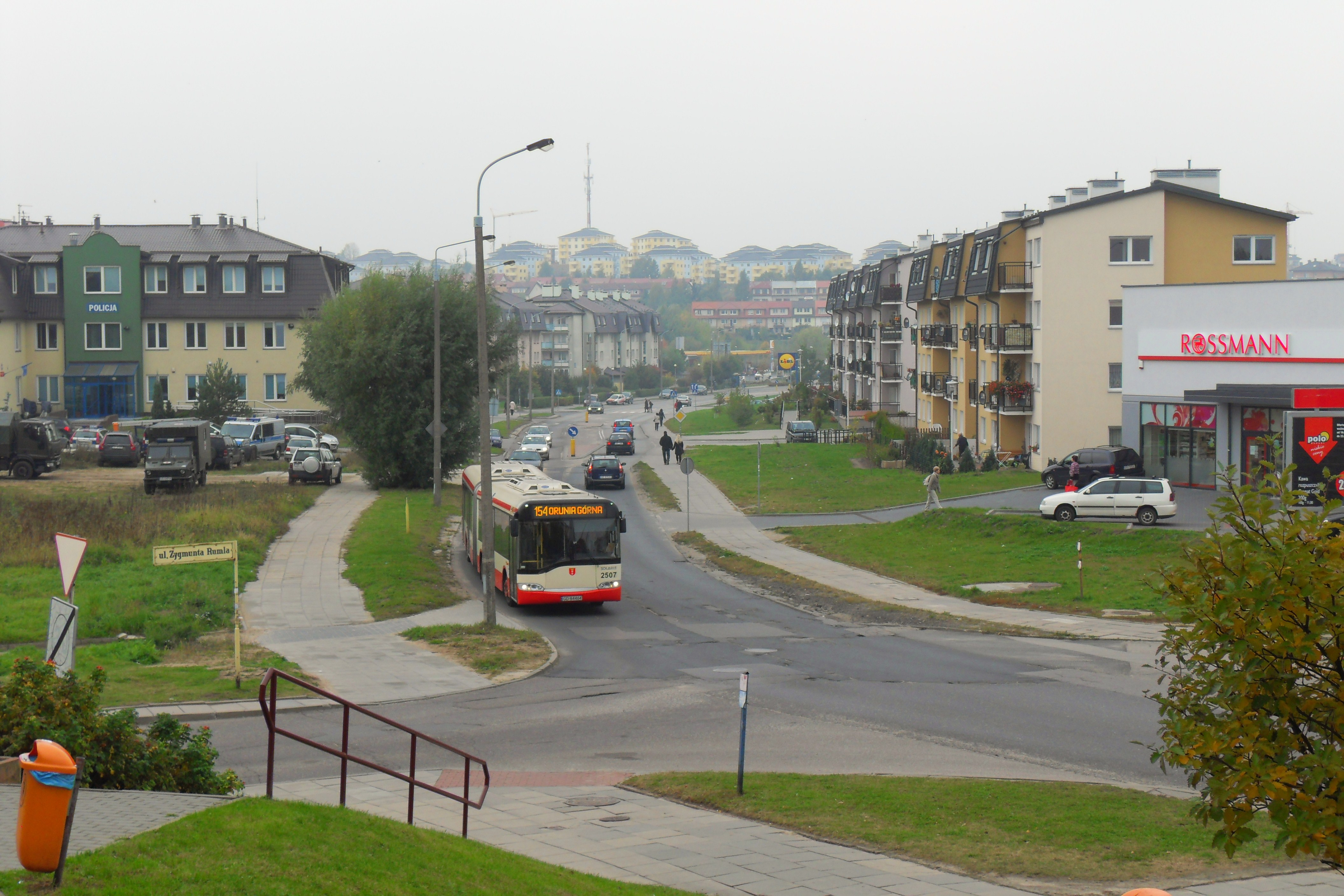
Platynowa Street

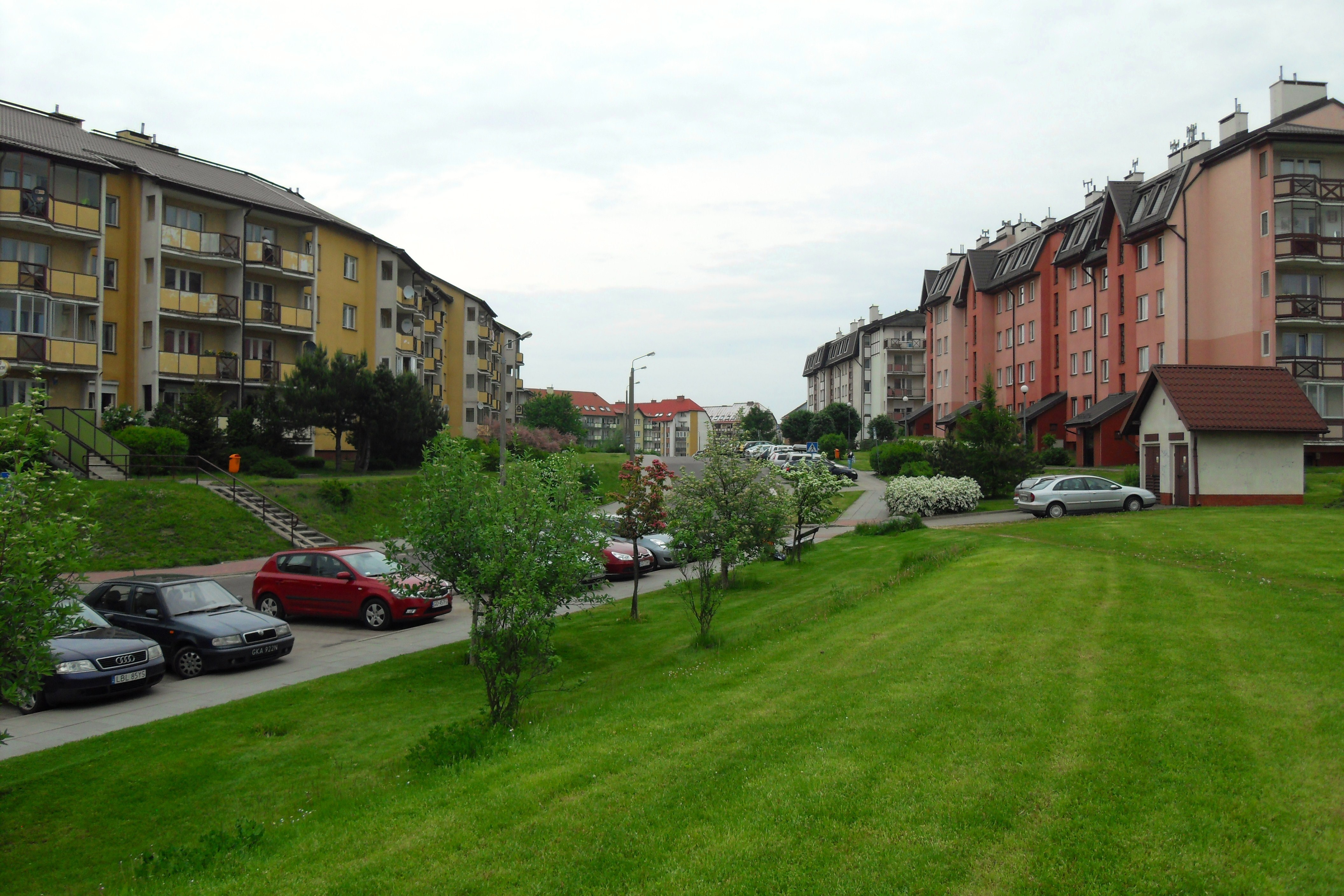
Dywizji Wołyńskiej Street, a typical residential street

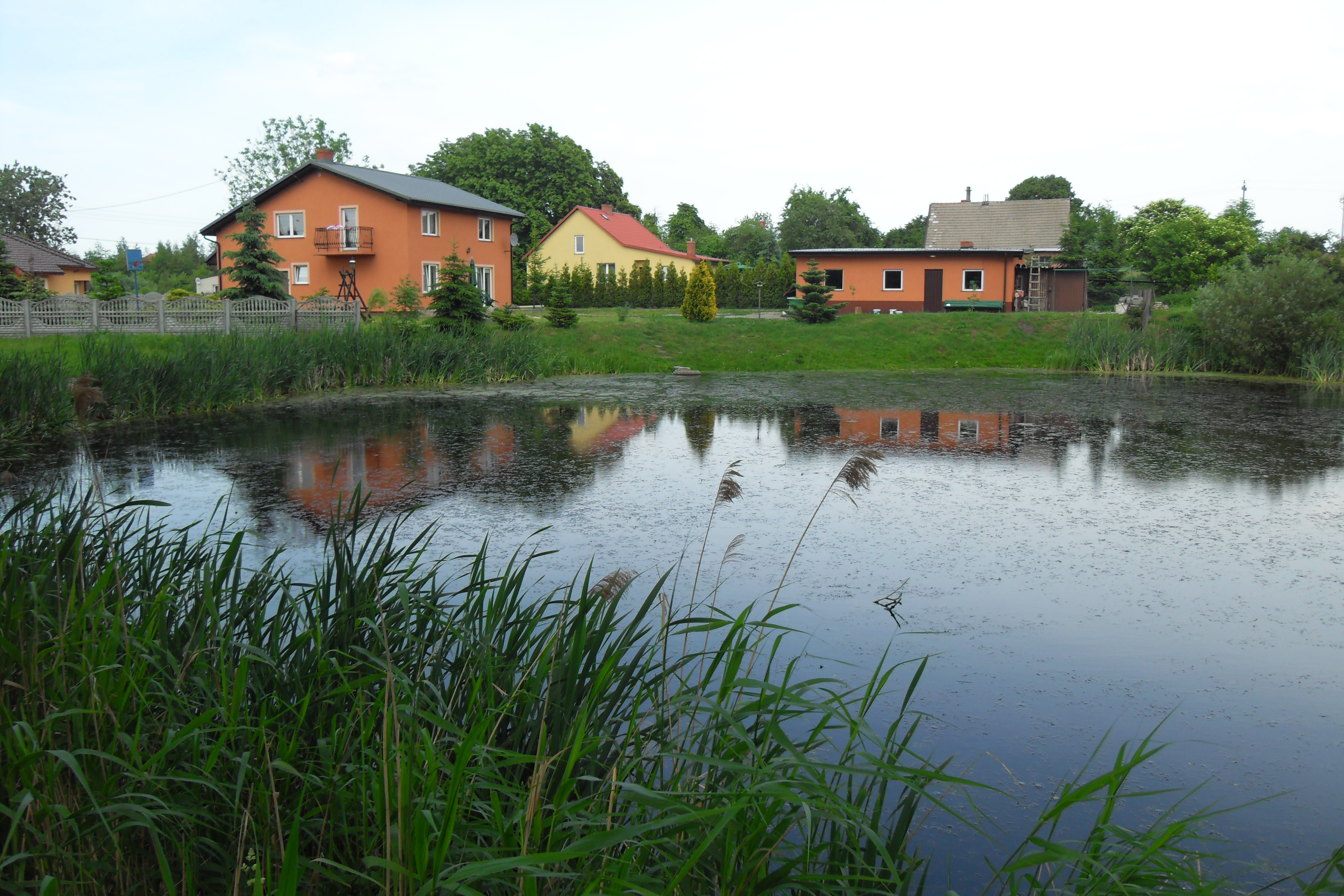
Houses in Maćkowy
