= Cycling in Gdańsk =

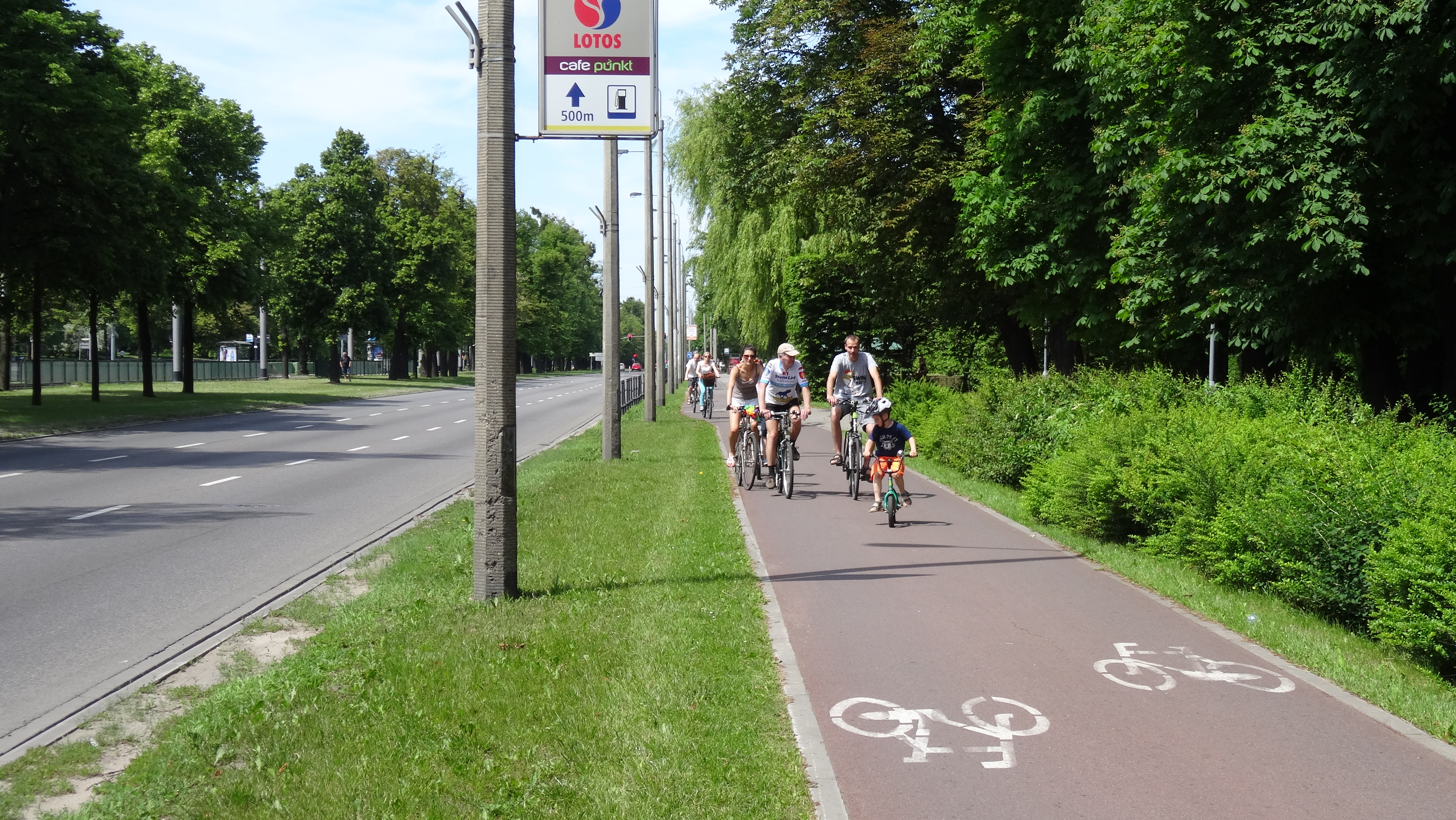
A bicycle path along al. Zwycięstwa (Victory Avenue)

Cycling has been present in Gdańsk since at least 1885; it remains a common form of transportation in the city to this day, and numerous bicycle paths and bicycle sharing locations are found across the city. Gdańsk has been noted as one of the most bicycle-friendly cities in all of Poland and has some of the highest volumes of bicycle traffic in the country.

== Characteristics ==
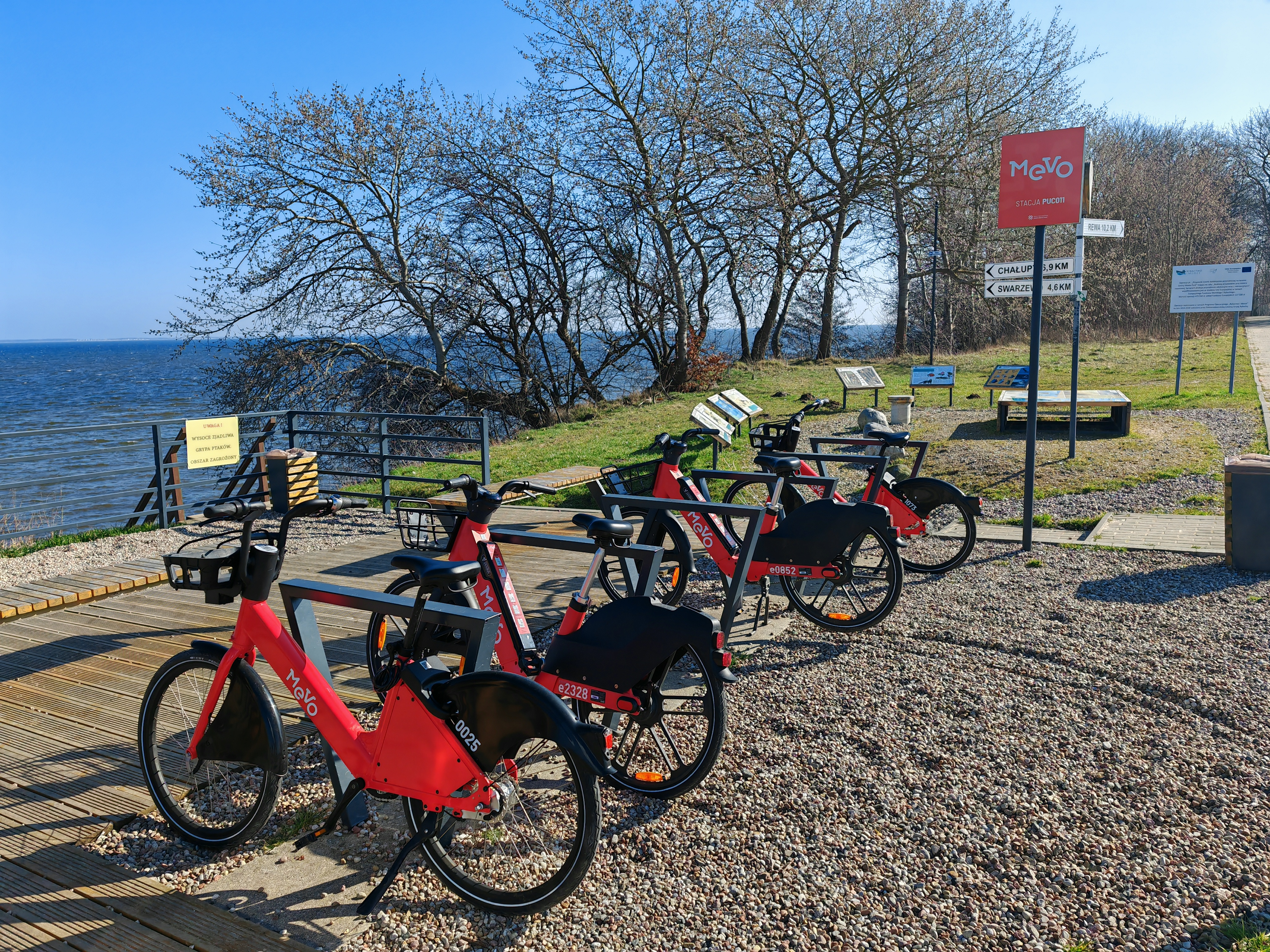
A group of parked Mevo bicycles

=== Bicycle paths and routes ===
As of 2023, 137.9 kilometres (85.7 mi) of segregated bicycle paths were found in Gdańsk, part of a broader 861.8 kilometres (535.5 mi) of bicycle-friendly routes in the city, including sidewalks, bicycle lanes, combined bicycle and bus lanes, and public roads with speed limits below 30 km/h (19 mph). These paths and routes lead to various tourist attractions, such as the Gdańsk Stadium, Gdańsk Shipyard, beaches in Brzeźno and Jelitkowo, the Sopot Pier, Ergo Arena, European Solidarity Centre, Westerplatte, St. Mary's Church, and the Abbots' Palace. Notable individual bicycle paths and routes are also found in districts such as Matarnia, Letnica, Brzeźno, Wyspa Sobieszewska, Suchanino, Siedlce, and Stogi.

=== Bicycle sharing ===
The Mevo bicycle sharing system is operated by a consortium of cities from the Tricity metropolitan area, including Gdańsk. It operates 3,044 electric bicycles and 438 charging stations and is accessible as a subscription service charging 29 zł per month or 259 zł per year.

=== Statistics ===
In a 2024 study of the bicycle-friendliness of Polish cities, Gdańsk was given the most positive ratings by its inhabitants, surpassing Poznań and Kraków in the cities above 200,000 inhabitants category. In addition, it had the most cyclists (respondents) of any Polish city. It also achieved a similar result in 2023. Bicycle traffic is measured by sensors at 30 different points in the city, which measured 1.2 million more bicycle riders in the city in 2024 than they had in 2023. That year, the Mevo system had a total of 13,000,000 km (8,100,000 mi) covered by its riders.

In 2019, bicycles were used for commuting by an average of 8% of Gdańsk citizens in some capacity, although individual employers caused variance among those percentages. For instance, in 2019, 21% of workers at the Alchemia Business Park commuted there by bicycle, whereas only 3% of the employees of the nearby Olivia Centre used bicycles for commuting.

== History ==
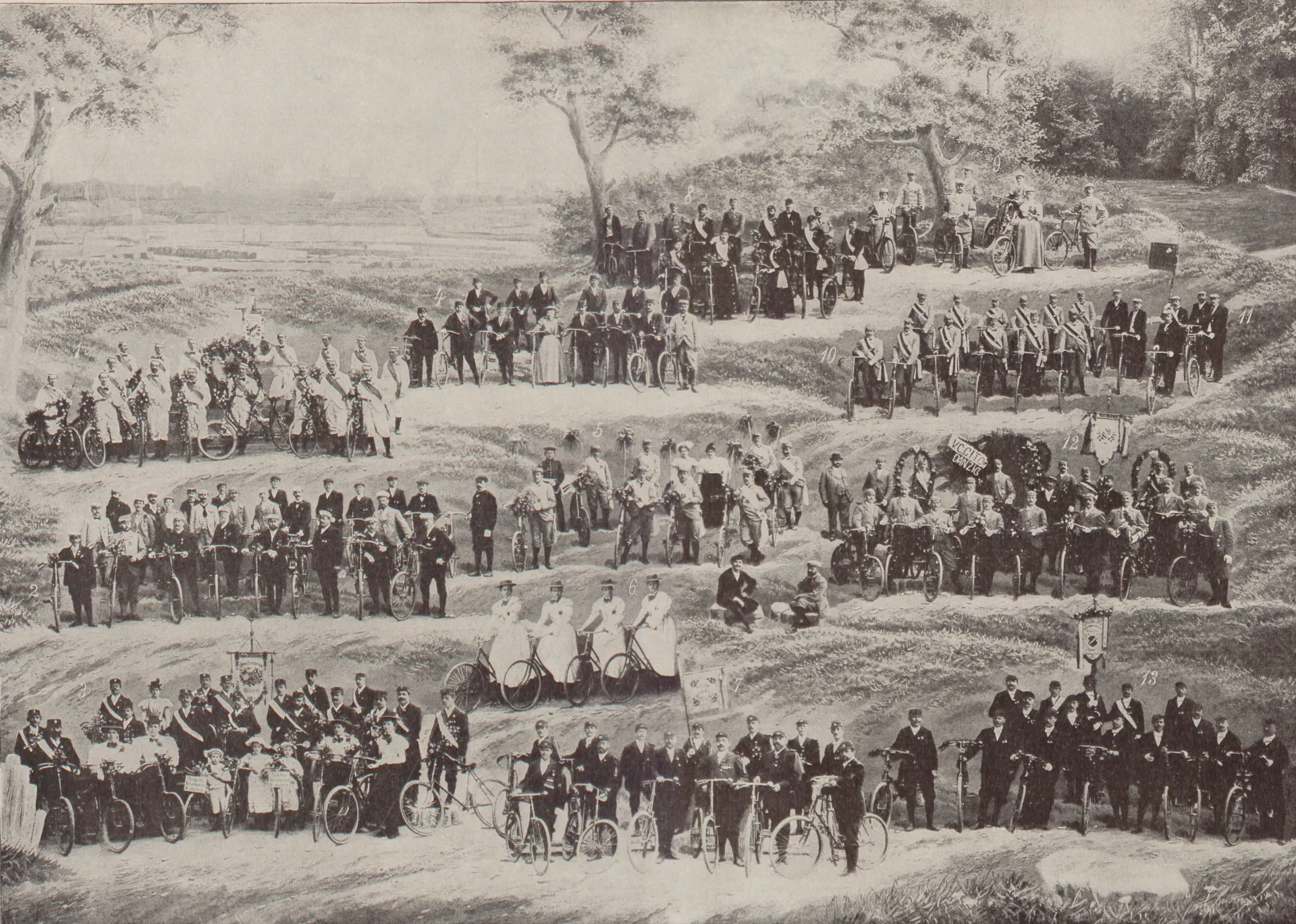
A photograph of participants at the first convention of the North German Division of Bicycle Companions, 1898

It is not known when cycling first appeared in Gdańsk, known in the 19th century as Danzig; however, by 1885, its popularity in the city had grown enough for the foundation of the Danzig Cyclists' Club (German: Danziger Radfahrer-Club). Several more cycling clubs, societies, and associations in the city would be founded soon after. The first women's cycling club in what is today Poland, the Danzig Women's Cycling Association "Violetta" (German: Damen-Radfahr-Verein "Violetta" Danzig), was founded in 1897.

A velodrome is known to have existed in Danzig from 1898 to the early 20th century, though details about it are sparsely known. The first dedicated bicycle paths in the city were created at the turn of the 19th and 20th centuries in Langfuhr and Oliva. During the interwar period, the Free City of Danzig experienced a prosperous period for sport and tourism. In 1934, Gedania Danzig, the main Polish sports club in the city, expanded with the creation of a cycling team, and in the 1920s and 1930s, several bicycle paths were built leading to the resort district of Heubude.

An increase in the popularity of cars in the interwar period posed a significant threat to cyclists, as well as drivers, and the Free City significantly cracked down on bicycle use. Despite this, bicycles remained symbols of Polish culture in the city. The next time cycling infrastructure would see a resurgence came in the early 1990s, with the construction of segregated bicycle paths in Zaspa. In 1997, the campaign Gdańsk miastem dla rowerów (Gdańsk as a city for bicycles) was started by the Citizens' Ecological League (Polish: Obywatelska Liga Ekologiczna), which managed to successfully pressure the city government to create segregated bicycle lanes and paths.

By 2015, according to Gazeta Wyborcza, Gdańsk was considered the "bicycle capital of Poland". Since that year, the annual campaign Rowerowy Maj has been occurring in Gdańsk, encouraging preschool and primary school students to ride bicycles. The Mevo bicycle sharing system was initially launched in 2019, but it soon became embroiled in financial trouble and was shut down that year. The system was relaunched in 2023 with greater success. In 2025, Gdańsk hosted the Velo-city conference of the European Cyclists' Federation.
