= Łostowice Cemetery =

Cemetery in Gdańsk, Poland

Łostowice cemetery
- Cmentarz Łostowicki
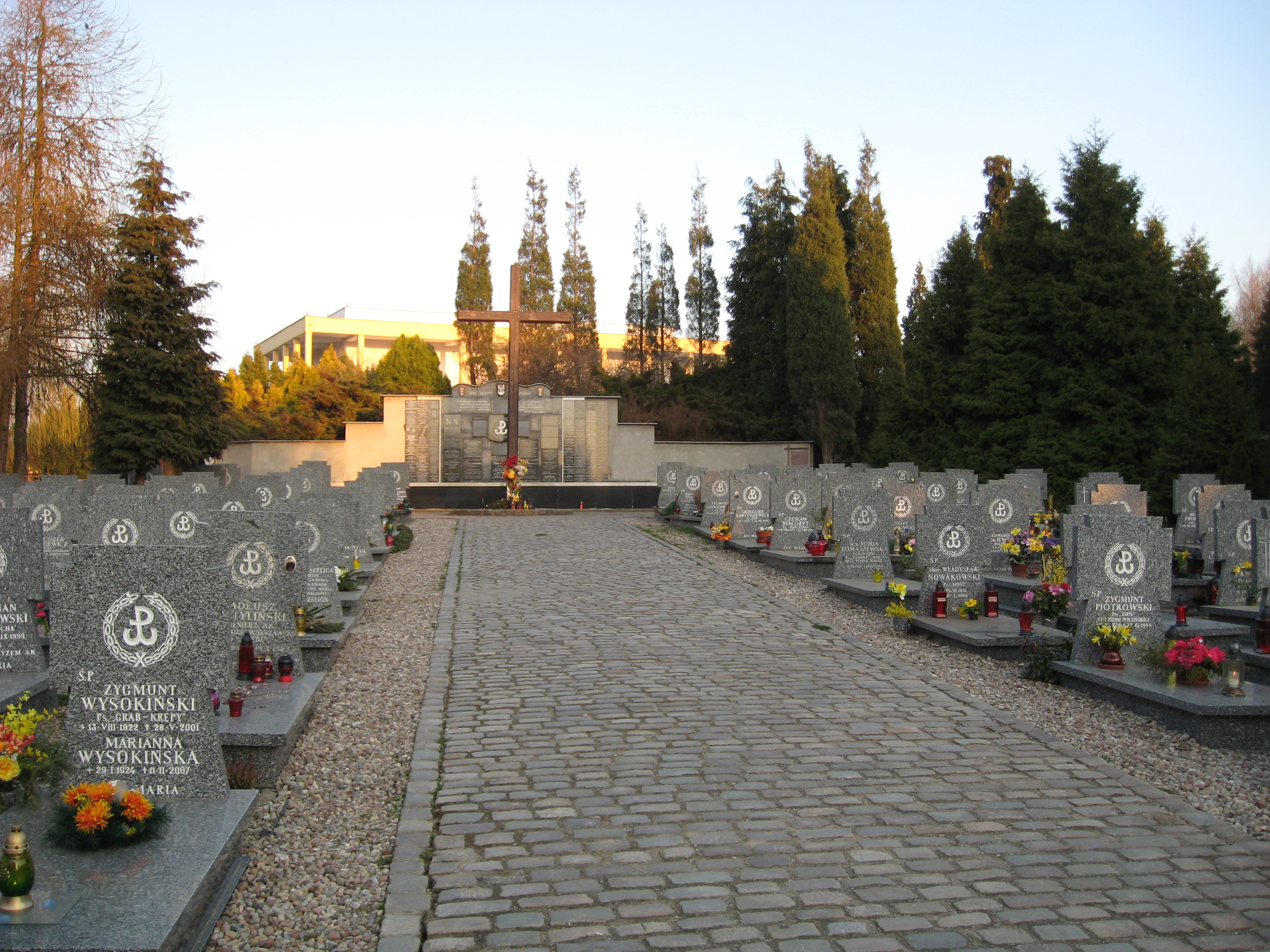
- The military section of the cemetery

Details
- Established: 1979
- Location: ul. Łostowicka 35; Ujeścisko-Łostowice and Siedlce, Gdańsk
- Coordinates: 54°20′28″N 18°35′49″E
- Owned by: Gdańsk Administration of Roads and Greenery
- Size: 50 ha (120 acres)
- Find a Grave: Łostowice cemetery

The Łostowice cemetery (Polish: Cmentarz Łostowicki), officially known as Communal Cemetery No. 5 (Polish: Cmentarz komunalny nr 5), is the largest cemetery in Gdańsk, located in the districts of Siedlce and Ujeścisko-Łostowice. Established on the grounds of an early 20th century cemetery dedicated to Saint Francis of Assisi, it was formally opened in 1979.

== Characteristics ==
The cemetery is managed by the Gdańsk Administration of Roads and Greenery. It has very high occupancy, with up to 95% of possible locations being taken up by graves by 2012. Measuring 52 ha (130 acres) in size, its area comprises the majority of the 100 ha (250 acres) of the city occupied by cemeteries.

== History ==
The oldest part of the cemetery was founded by a nearby church in 1904 and is dedicated to Saint Francis of Assisi. The cemetery, officially known as Communal Cemetery No. 5, was founded on fields of crops in 1979, with the older institution becoming part of it. The new, larger cemetery became colloquially known as Łostowice Cemetery, as it was located on ul. Łostowicka, literally translating to "Łostowice Street"; in reality, only part of the cemetery is found in Łostowice.

Since the end of communist rule in Poland, the cemetery has expanded with monuments and sections commemorating members of the Home Army, victims of the Katyn massacre, and Sybiraks.

=== Recent history ===
In 2021, an expansion and renovation project of the Łostowice Cemetery began, increasing its size by 1.8 ha (4.4 acres) and adding a further 2,186 locations for graves. The expansion was completed in June 2022 and was part of a broader project to expand several local cemeteries.

== Gallery ==
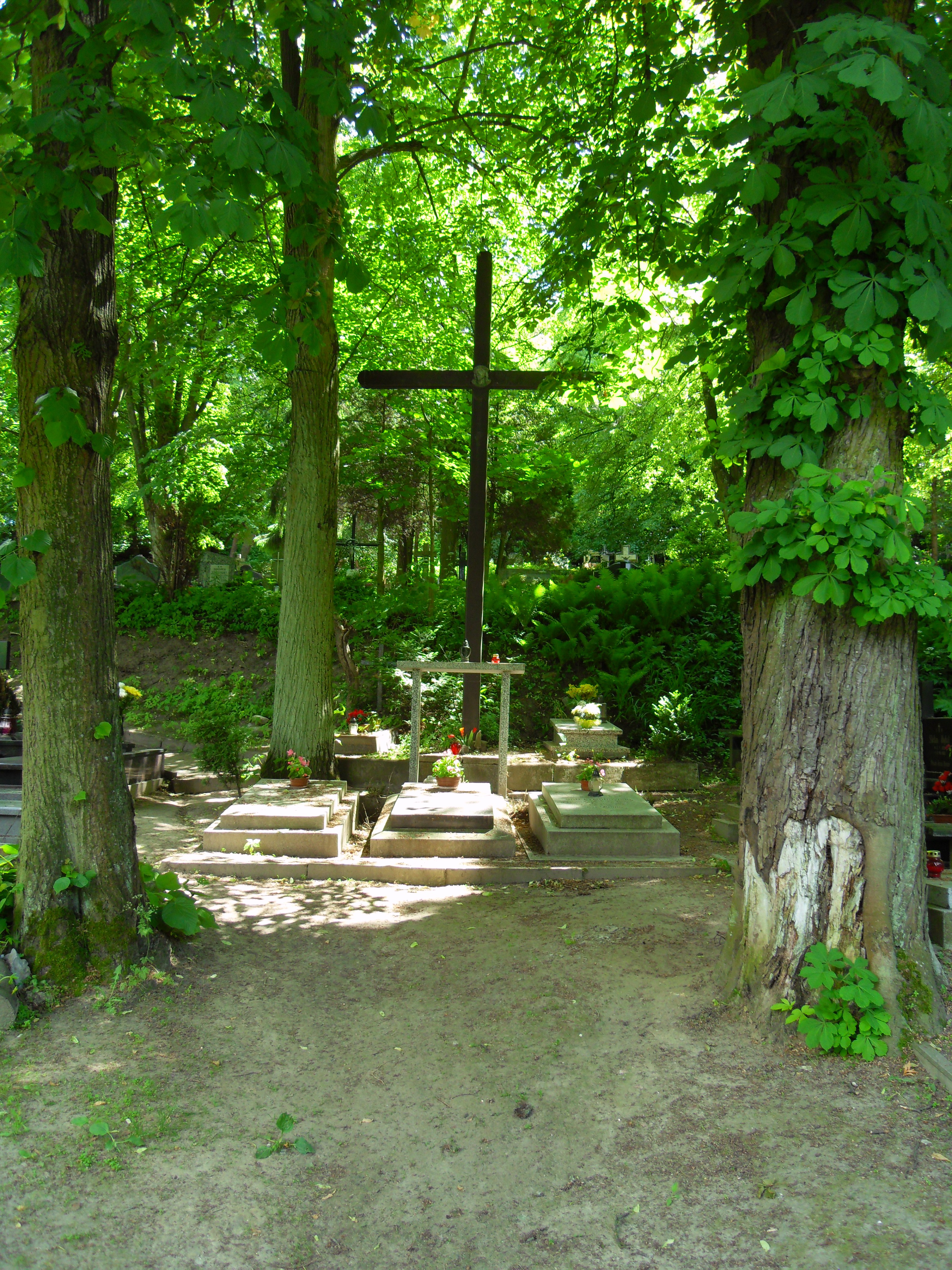
The former cemetery of Saint Francis of Assisi

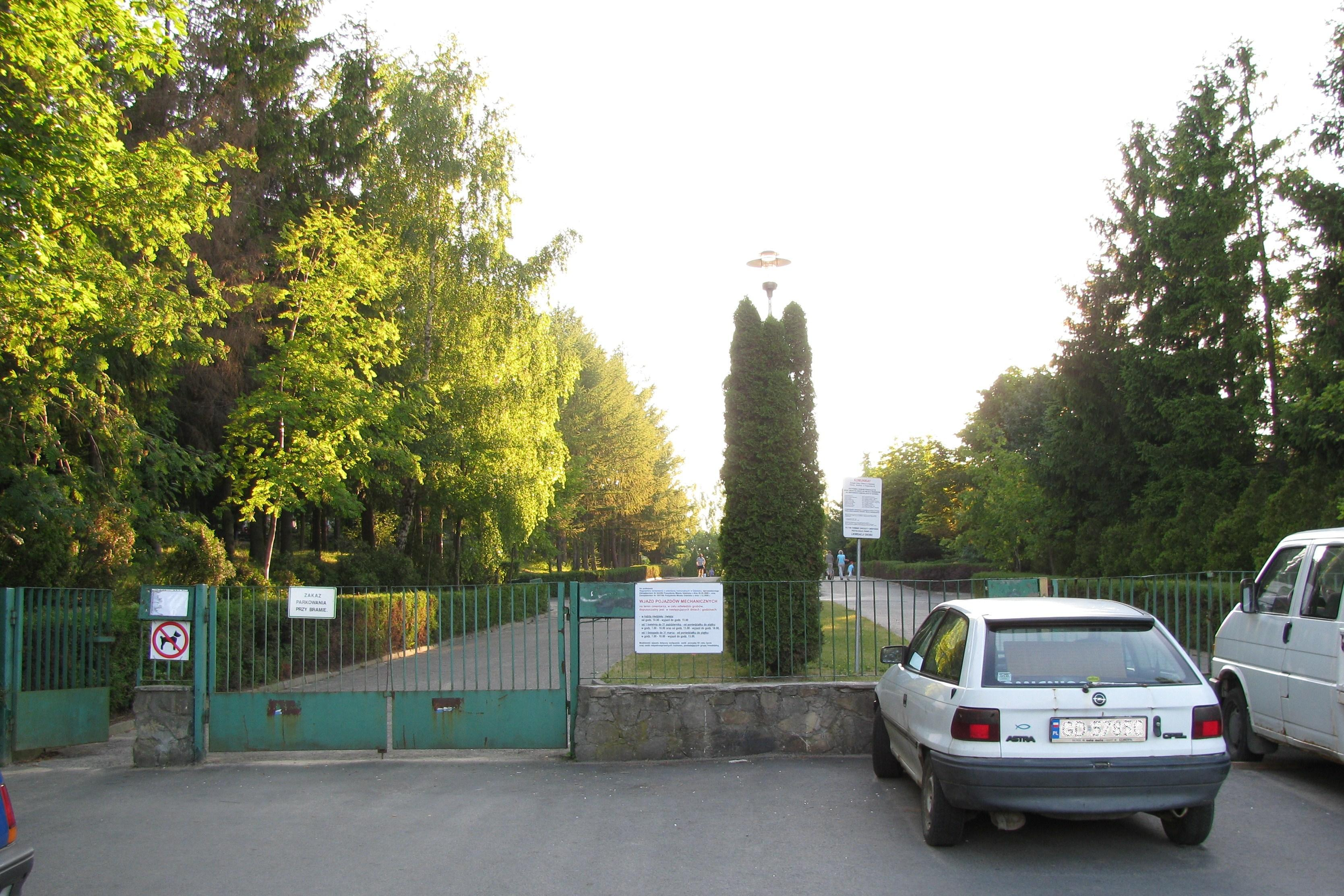
The cemetery's main entrance

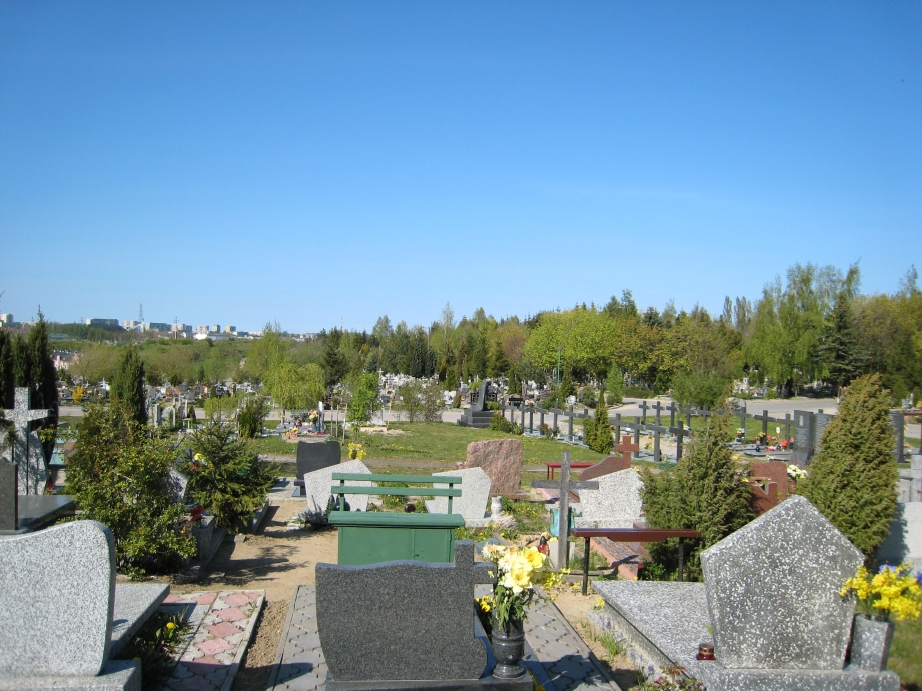
A photograph of the cemetery, 2007
