= Mevo =

Mevo may refer to:

- Mevo Beitar
- Mevo Dotan
- Mevo Hama
- Mevo Horon
- Mevo Modi'im
- Rova Mevo Ha'ir
- Mevo (bicycle sharing system)
