= Ujeścisko-Łostowice =

- District (dzielnica)
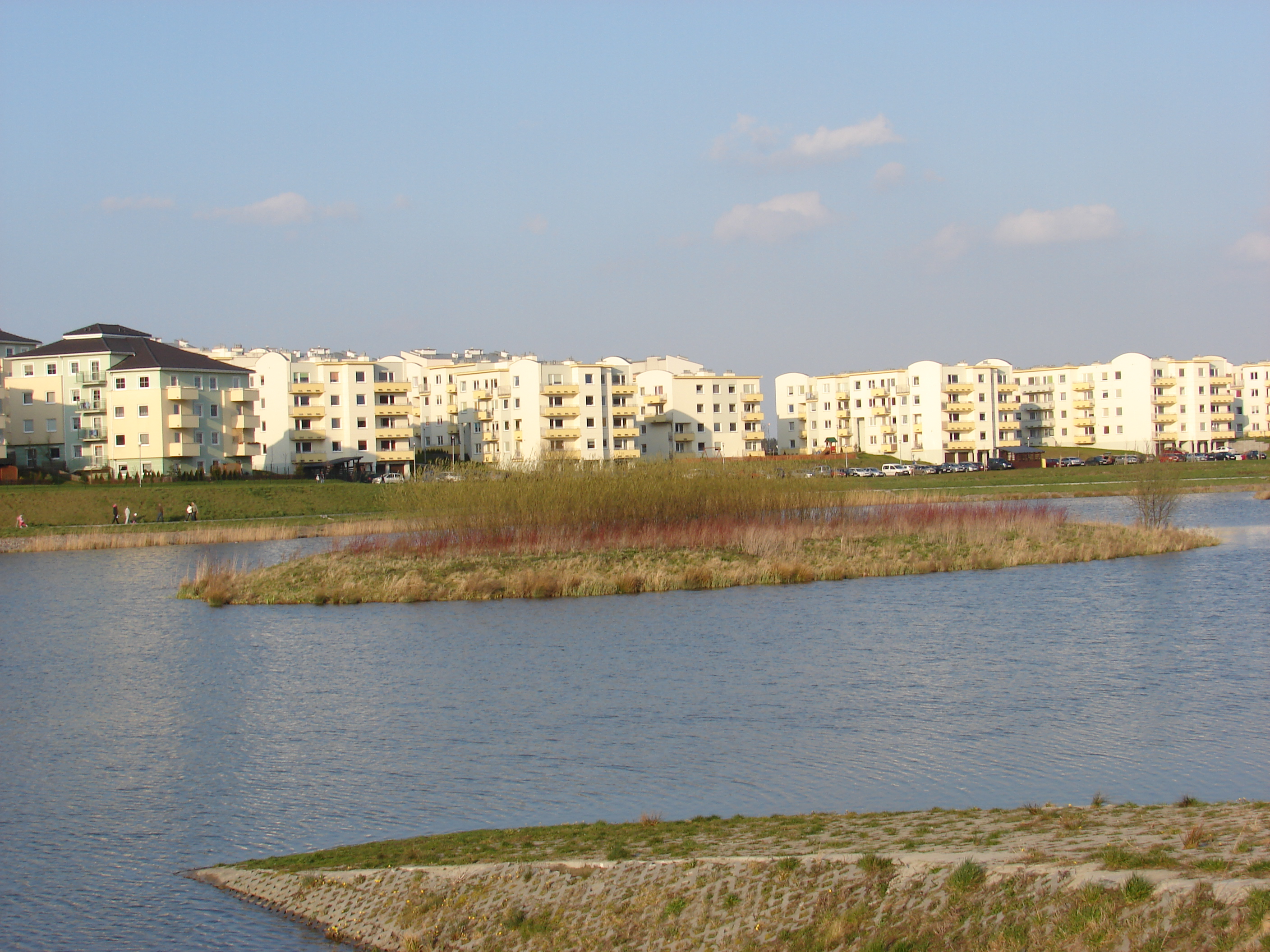
- Zakoniczyn

- Location of Ujeścisko-Łostowice within Gdańsk
- Coordinates: 54°19′44″N 18°35′0″E
- Country: Poland
- Voivodeship: Pomeranian
- County/City: Gdańsk

Area
  - Total: 7.795 km^{2} (3.010 sq mi)

Population (2019)
  - Total: 26,476
  - Density: 3,397/km^{2} (8,797/sq mi)
- Time zone: UTC+1 (CET)
  - Summer (DST): UTC+2 (CEST)
- Area code: +48 58

Ujeścisko-Łostowice is one of the administrative districts (dzielnica administracyjna) of the city of Gdańsk, Poland. Currently, it is one of the city's most rapidly developing and most populous suburban areas.

== Location ==
From the north, Ujeścisko-Łostowice is bordered by Piecki-Migowo, Siedlce and Wzgórze Mickiewicza, from the east by Chełm and Orunia Górna-Gdańsk Południe (which also borders it from the south), from the south by Gmina Kolbudy and from the west by Jasień.

Ujeścisko-Łostowice is further divided into the quarters (osiedla) of Łostowice, Ujeścisko, Zabornia, and Zakoniczyn.

== History ==
=== Ujeścisko ===
Ujeścisko was first recorded under the name Mesthin in 1338, but was renamed Wonneberg by the ruling Teutonic State in 1379. The village of Wonneberg occupied the area of many districts of modern Gdańsk, including Wzgórze Mickiewicza and Jasień. Wonneberg was given to the nearby city of Danzig, today Gdańsk, in 1410 by Władysław Jagiełło. In the late medieval and early modern periods, Wonneberg was destroyed twice, in 1433 (during the Hussite expedition to the Baltic) and 1577 (during the Danzig rebellion). It also lost land in territorial disputes with nearby settlements.

In the 17th century, the village witnessed significant growth. In 1807, fighting occurred in Wonneberg during the Napoleonic Wars as part of the broader Siege of Danzig. Several of those lost in the fighting were buried there. In the 19th century, the village experienced further growth; its population of 338 in 1835 had grown to 687 by 1848 and 898 by 1880. Additionally, in 1836, the city of Danzig lost ownership of the village.

In 1879, Wojciech Kętrzyński, a local historian, proposed the area's current Polish name, Ujeścisko, though it initially was Wujeścisko. The village, now part of the Free City of Danzig, continued its growth well into the 20th century, and had a population of 990 people by 1929. Wonneberg was again incorporated into the city of Danzig in 1942, but, after the new communist government of Poland took control of the area in 1945, they reversed the decision. In 1954, the village of Ujeścisko took on its final form when Wzgórze Mickiewicza, then known as Nowe Ujeścisko, was separated and joined the city of Gdańsk. In 1973, Ujeścisko rejoined the city of Gdańsk once again.

=== Łostowice ===
Łostowice was first mentioned in 1334 as Włostowice, but, starting in 1356, was attested in German as Schonevelt and Schönfeld. It was a smaller village than Ujeścisko, and, also beginning in 1356, was owned by a string of several noble and bourgeoisie families from Danzig. In 1923, 401 people lived in the village, which was 6 less than in 1910. It remained privately owned up until it was taken by the Red Army and integrated into communist Poland. In 1973, Łostowice joined the city of Gdańsk.

=== As one district ===
Both Ujeścisko and Łostowice became part of the Chełm i Gdańsk-Południe district upon being integrated into the city of Gdańsk, but were separated into the district of Ujeścisko-Łostowice in 2010. The district has experienced rapid growth and development related to the construction of suburban housing in the area, accompanied by investments into transport. The area has also faced issues surrounding the Łostowice Cemetery, the city of Gdańsk's largest cemetery, and its rapid growth.
