= Osowa =

District of Gdańsk, Poland

Coordinates: 54°25′38″N 18°28′15″E

- District (dzielnica)
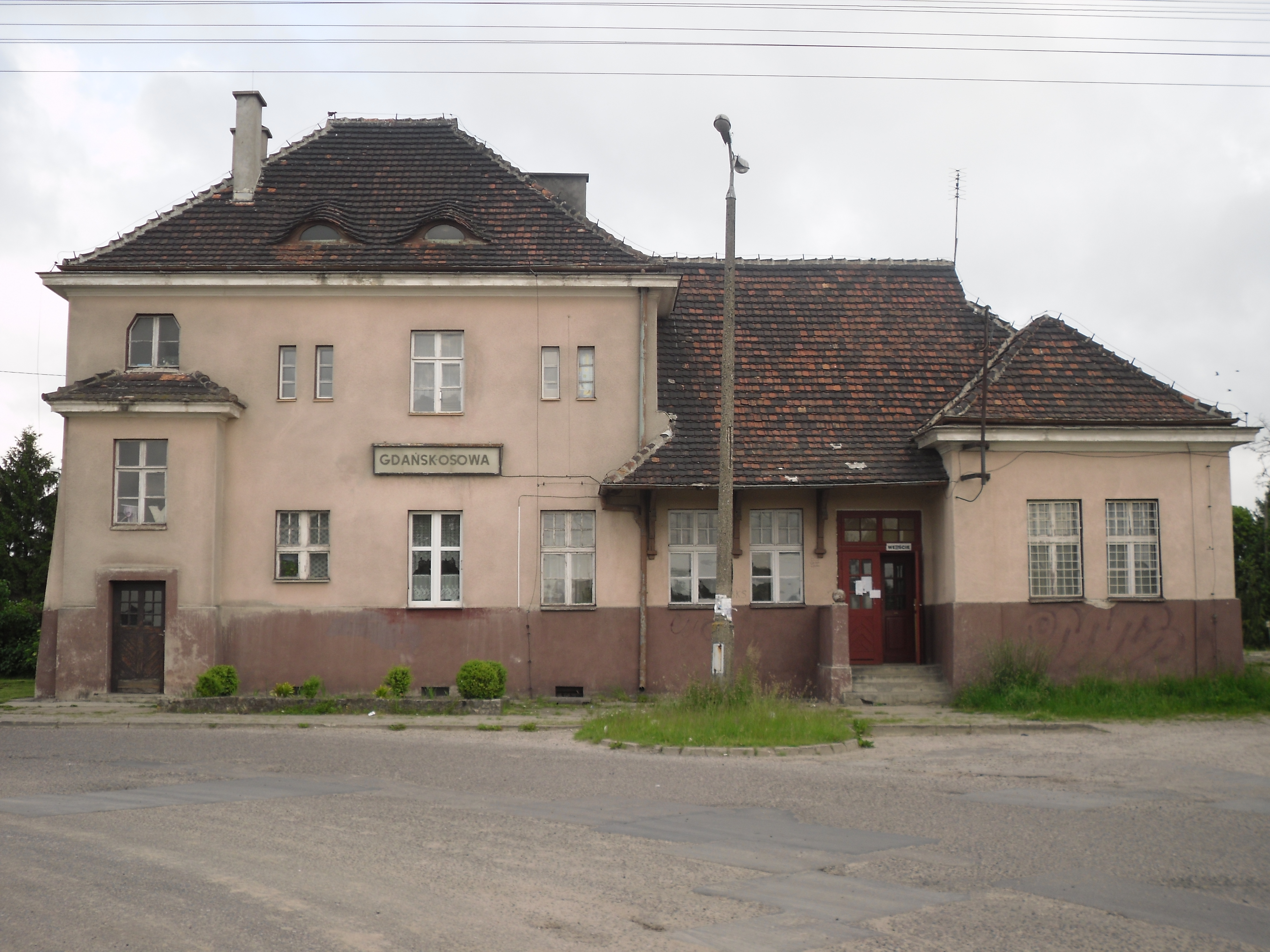
- Gdańsk Osowa railway station

- Location of Osowa within Gdańsk
- Country: Poland
- Voivodeship: Pomeranian
- City: Gdańsk

Area
  - Total: 13.73 km^{2} (5.30 sq mi)

Population
  - Total: 16,247
  - Density: 1,183/km^{2} (3,065/sq mi)
- Postal code: 80-299
- Area code(s): 58

Osowa (German: Espenkrug; Kashubian: Òsowô) is a district of Gdańsk, Poland, located in the city's northwestern areas. It is mostly suburban and residential.

== Location ==
Osowa borders the cities of Gdynia and Sopot to the north, Gmina Żukowo to the west, Matarnia to the south, and Oliwa to the east. It comprises the quarters (osiedla) of Wysoka, Barniewice, Owczarnia, Kukawka, and Nowy Świat.

== History ==
The village of Osowa is first mentioned in 1659 as Espenkrug, an inn belonging to the Oliwa Abbey. Its current name, Osowa, comes from the German word Espen, meaning aspen. In 1783, the lands owned by the Abbey were secularized and developed into a village. As of 1867, Espenkrug had 153 inhabitants. The construction of a brickyard in the late 19th century accelerated its growth. After World War I, it became part of the Second Polish Republic. In 1922, the Polish Coal Trunk-Line started running through the settlement. A railway station on the line was opened in Osowa in 1930.

The Red Army took Osowa on 18 March 1945. The village was extensively rebuilt after the war. In 1973, Osowa was incorporated into the borders of the city of Gdańsk, with a total of 1433 inhabitants at the time. Various housing projects expanded its population in 1973, 1979, and 1980. The district's population has kept growing ever since. In 2015, the area's railway station was rebuilt and today serves trains of the Pomeranian Metropolitan Railway (PKM).
