= Wzgórze Mickiewicza =

District of Gdańsk, Poland

Coordinates: 54.3667°N 18.6333°E

- District (dzielnica)
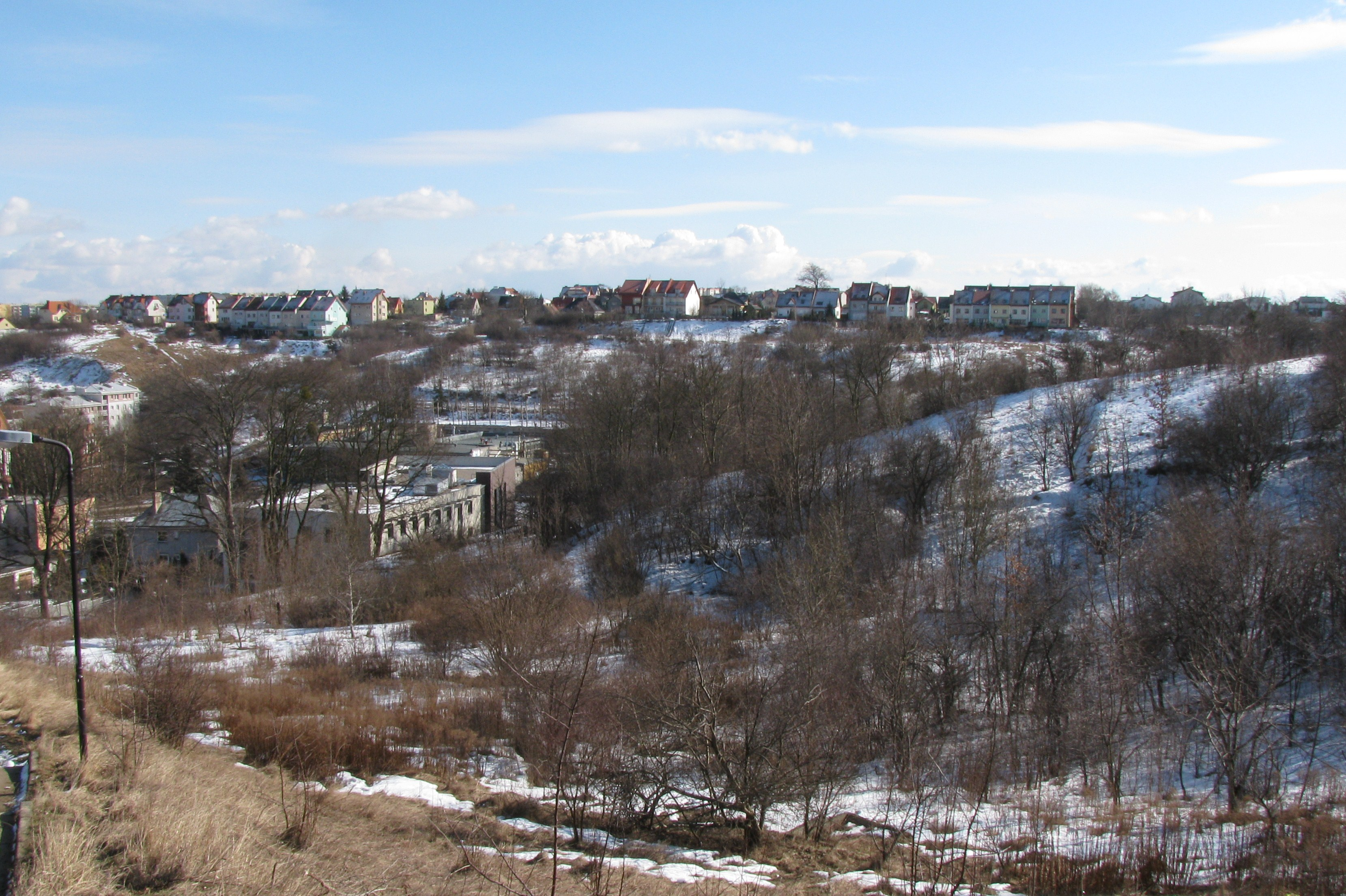

- Location of Wzgórze Mickiewicza within Gdańsk
- Country: Poland
- Voivodeship: Pomeranian
- City: Gdańsk

Area
  - Total: 0.52 km^{2} (0.20 sq mi)

Population
  - Total: 2,375
  - Density: 4,600/km^{2} (12,000/sq mi)

Wzgórze Mickiewicza (Kashubian: Nowé Ùjescëskò) is one of the quarters of the city of Gdańsk, Poland. It is the city's smallest district by population and land area.

== Location and geography ==
Wzgórze Mickiewicza borders Siedlce to the north, east, and west and Chełm to the south. Unlike most other districts of the city, it is not divided into any quarters (osiedla). It consists of about 800 single-family homes, located on a hillock.

== History ==
The area where Wzgórze Mickiewicza is found today was formerly the northeastern part of the village of Ujeścisko (Wonneberg). In 1935, it was separated from Wonneberg and named Neuwonneberg. In 1942, it was incorporated into the city boundaries of Danzig alongside Wonneberg, but this was reversed in 1945 when the new Polish government arrived. The village was renamed Nowe Ujeścisko and eventually reincorporated into Gdańsk in 1954.

In the 1980s, the area, which, up to that point, had remained largely agricultural, started being built up with large amounts of housing. The names for the streets were taken from the characters of Pan Tadeusz, Poland's national epic. Its current name, Wzgórze Mickiewicza—meaning Mickiewicz Hill—comes from these street names, as Adam Mickiewicz was the author of the epic. A statue of Mickiewicz is also present near one of the entrances to the area, with the text below it reading: Wszystko co nasze jest Ojczyzny jest (All that is ours belongs to the homeland). Some of the street names include Wojski, Zosia, Protazy, Maciej, and Pan Tadeusz Streets.

== Gallery ==
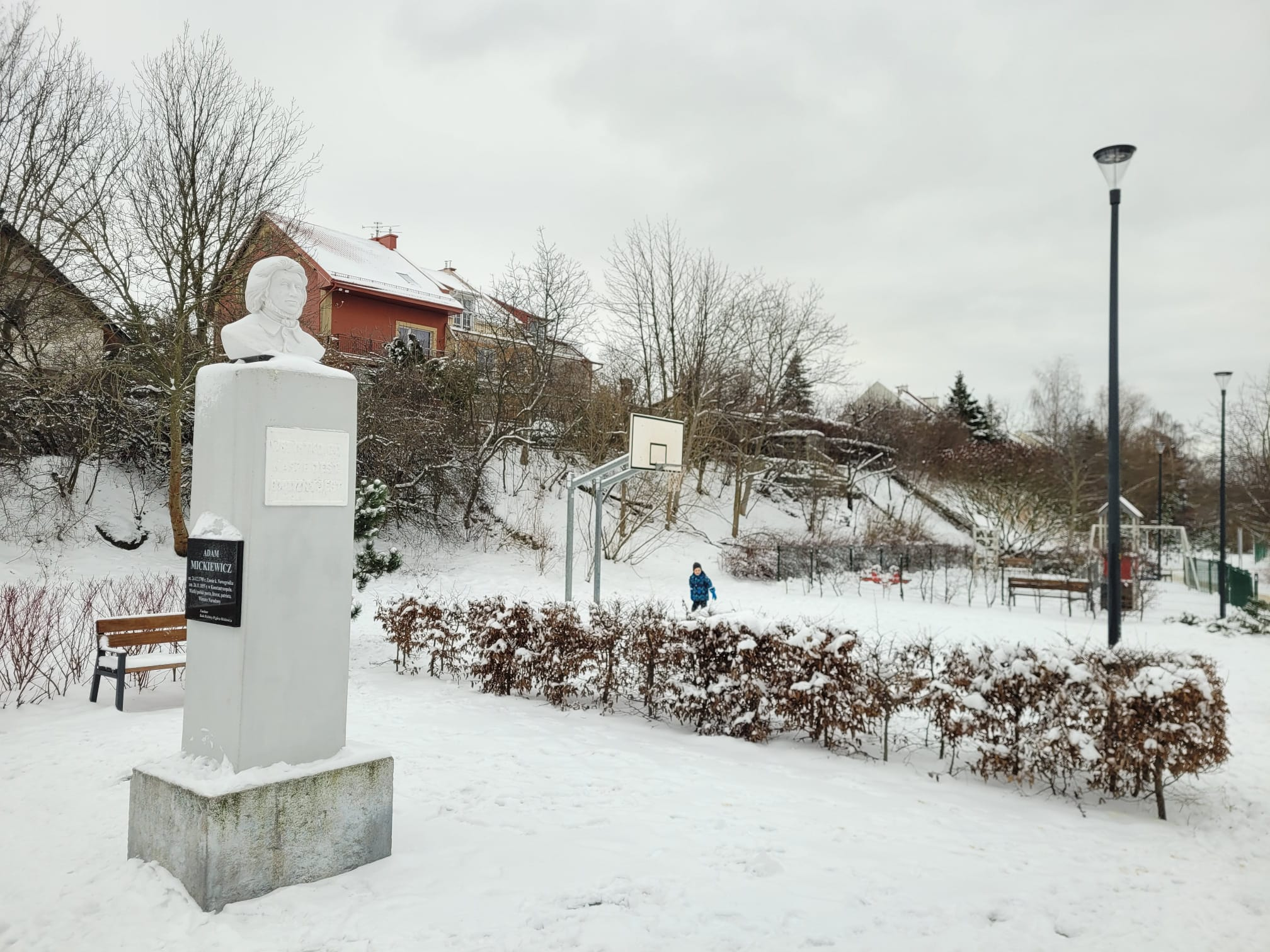
Statue of Adam Mickiewicz

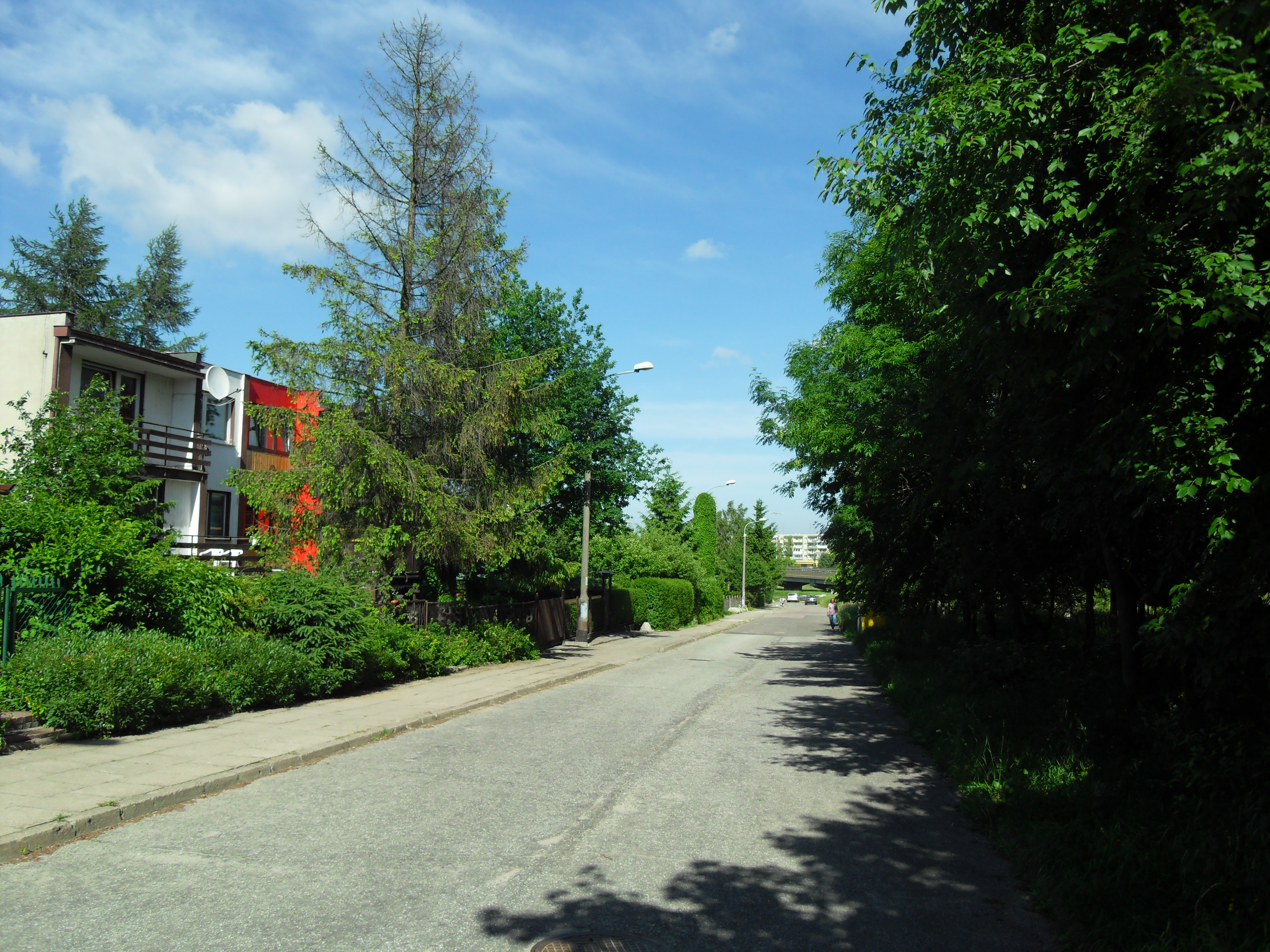
Filaretów Street

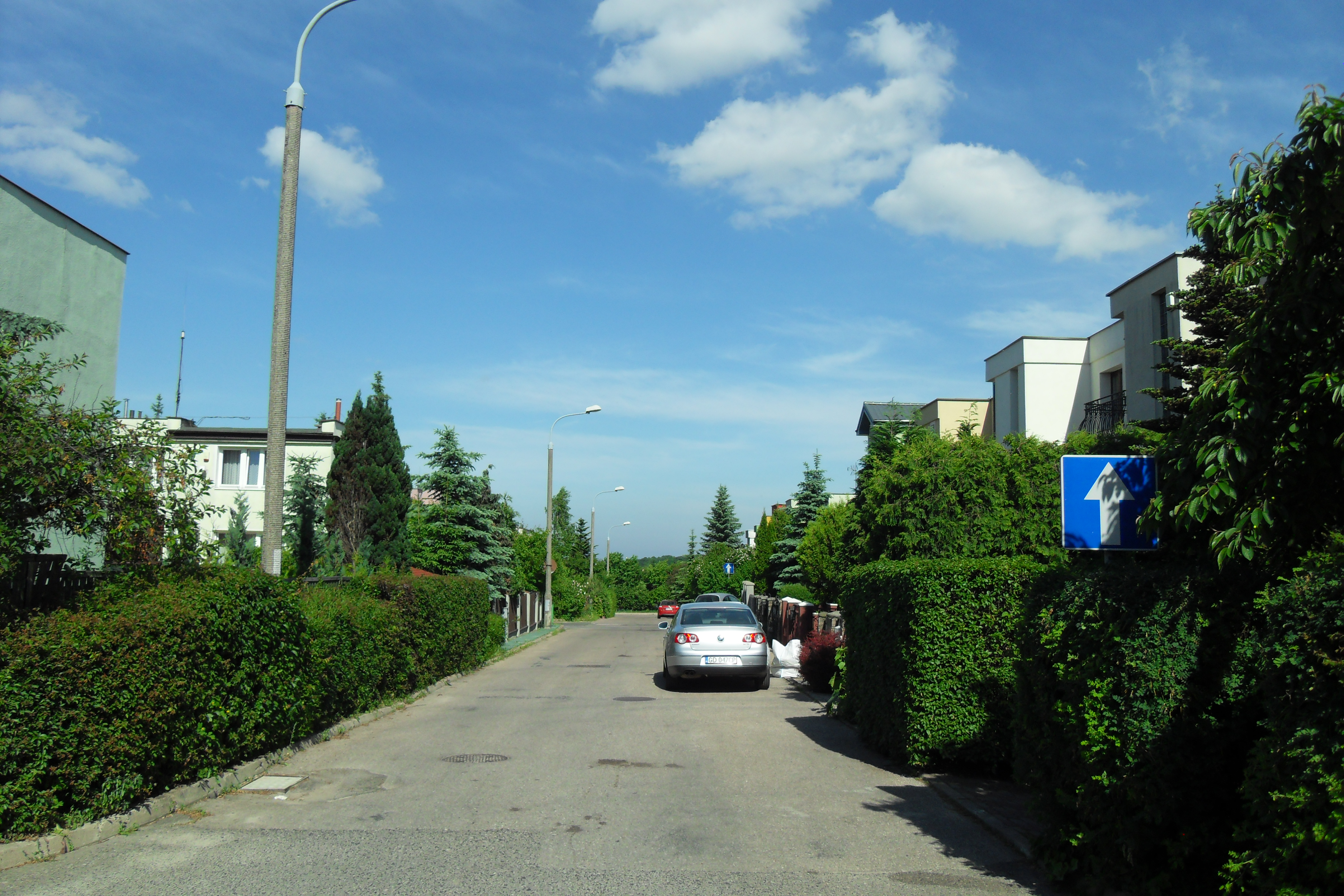
Domeyko Street
