= Matarnia =

Coordinates: 54°23′N 18°31′E

- District (dzielnica)
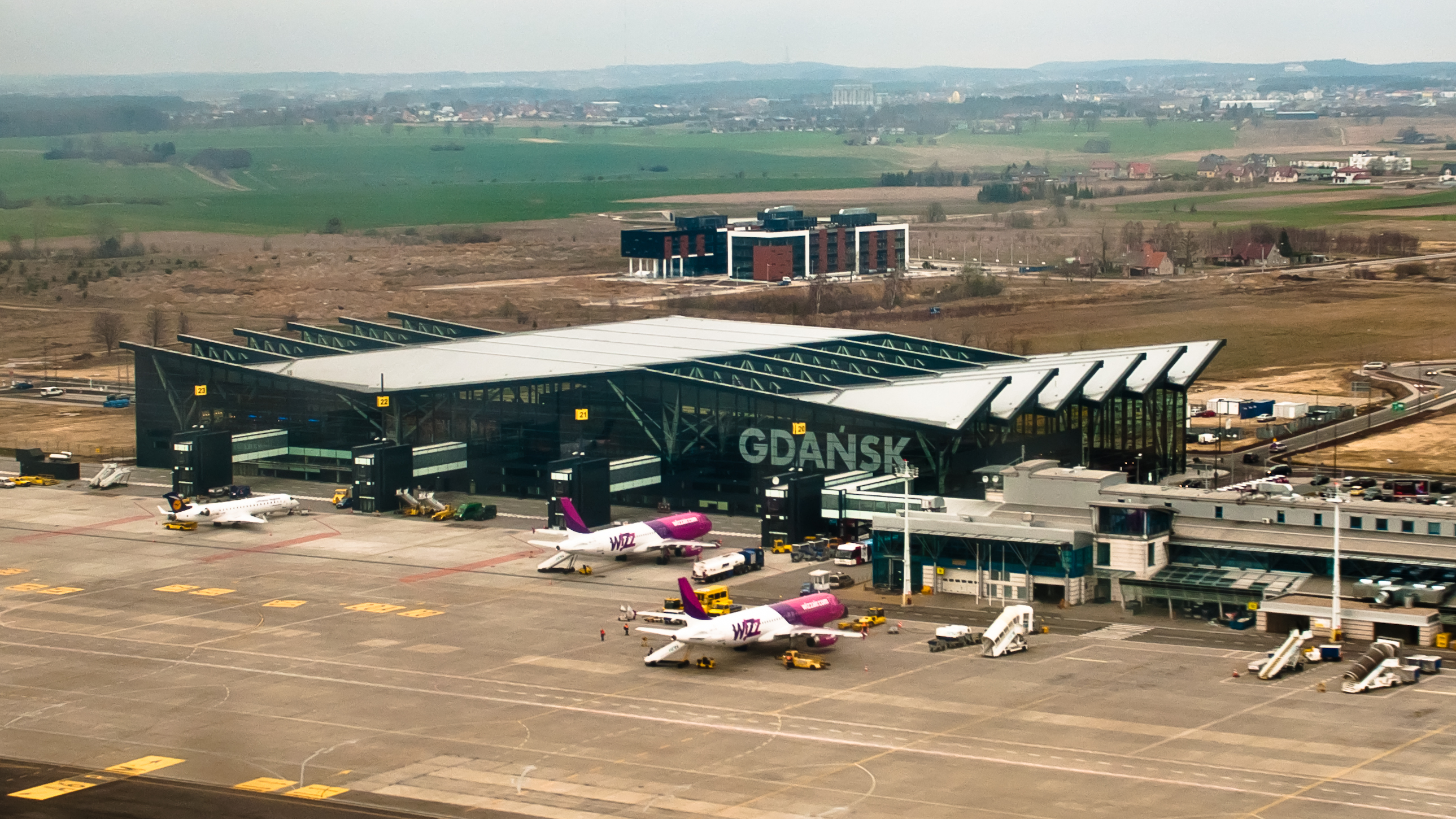
- Gdańsk Lech Wałęsa Airport in Matarnia

- Location of Matarnia within Gdańsk
- Country: Poland
- Voivodeship: Pomeranian
- County/City: Gdańsk
- Within city limits: 1973

Area
  - Total: 14.48 km^{2} (5.59 sq mi)

Population (2019)
  - Total: 5,939
  - Density: 410.2/km^{2} (1,062/sq mi)
- Time zone: UTC+1 (CET)
  - Summer (DST): UTC+2 (CEST)

Matarnia (German: Mattern; Kashubian: Matarniô) is an administrative district of Gdańsk, Poland, located in the western part of the city. It is notable for containing Gdańsk Lech Wałęsa Airport within its boundaries.

== Location ==
Matarnia borders Osowa and Oliwa to the north, Brętowo to the east, Jasień and Kokoszki to the south, and Gmina Żukowo to the west. It contains the quarters (osiedla) of Firoga, Klukowo, Trzy Norty, Zajączkowo, and Nowa Karczma. It also shares the quarter of Rębiechowo with Kokoszki.

== History ==
The village of Wielkie Chojno was the first settlement in the area, given by Mestwin II, Duke of Pomerania, to the Oliwa Abbey in 1283. The village was destroyed in 1433 during the Hussite expedition to the Baltic. It was also devastated during the Thirteen Years' War and rebuilt in 1472. As of 1583, Wielkie Chojno had 20 inhabitants.

Wielkie Chojno was destroyed in 1577 during the Siege of Danzig and again rebuilt. The church in Wielkie Chojno was rebuilt and dedicated to Saint Maternus, among others. The district's current name comes from the Polish translation of the saint's name, św. Matern. The village was seized by the Prussian government in 1772, and in 1783, the abbey's remaining lands were secularized and given to a private owner. On those lands, a manor was built.

As of 1869, 181 people lived in the village, most of whom were Catholics. The town was taken by the Red Army on 24 March 1945, and a State Agricultural Farm was established on the former lands of the manor. After the closure of the city's airport in Wrzeszcz, in 1974, the Gdańsk Lech Wałęsa Airport was opened in Matarnia. In 2015, Gdańsk Matarnia railway station, a commuter rail station, was opened in the district.

== Gallery ==
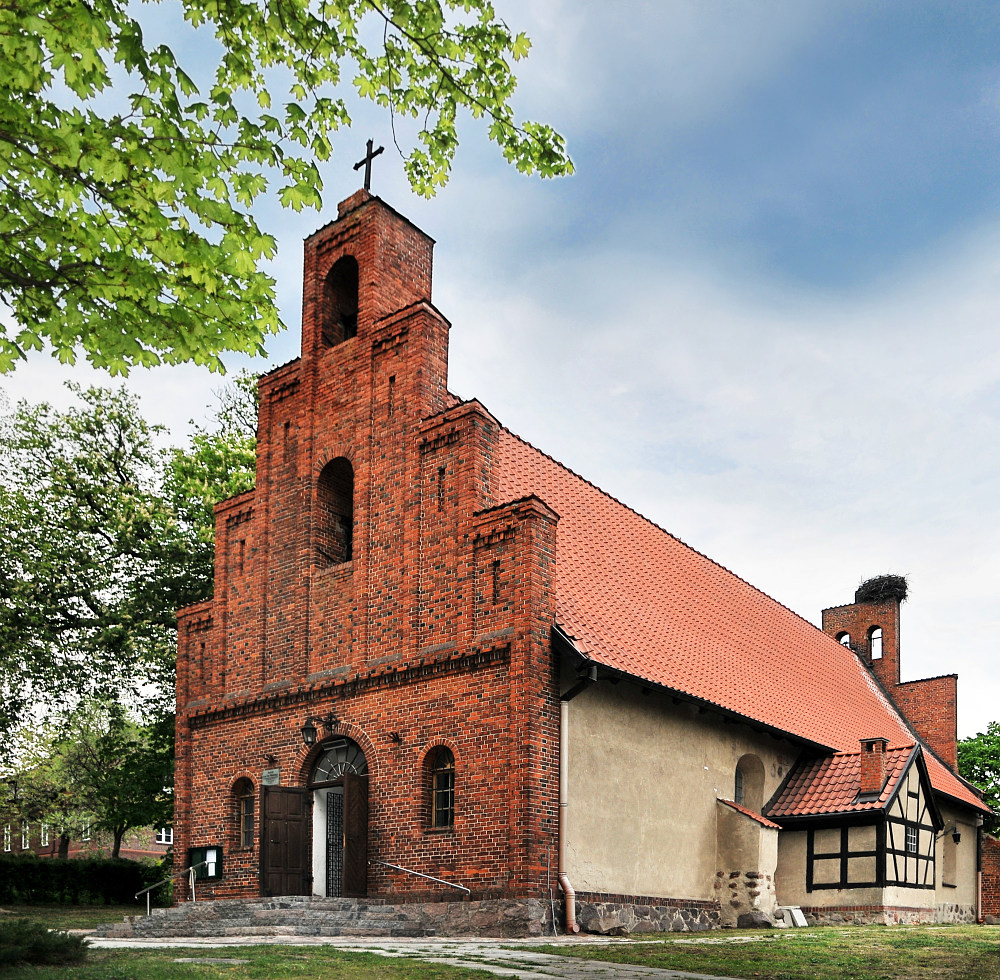
Brick Gothic Saint Valentine church

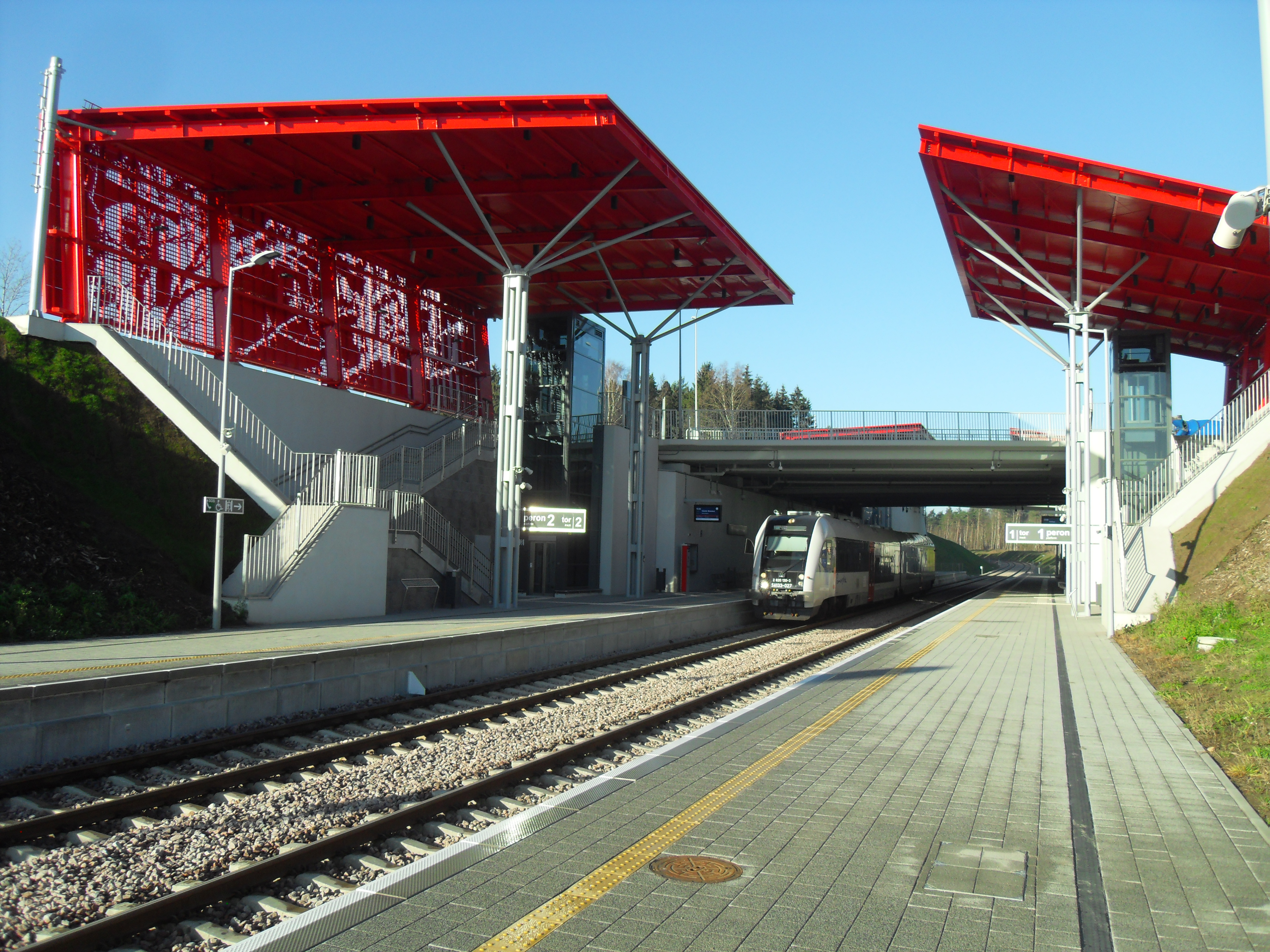
Gdańsk Matarnia railway station

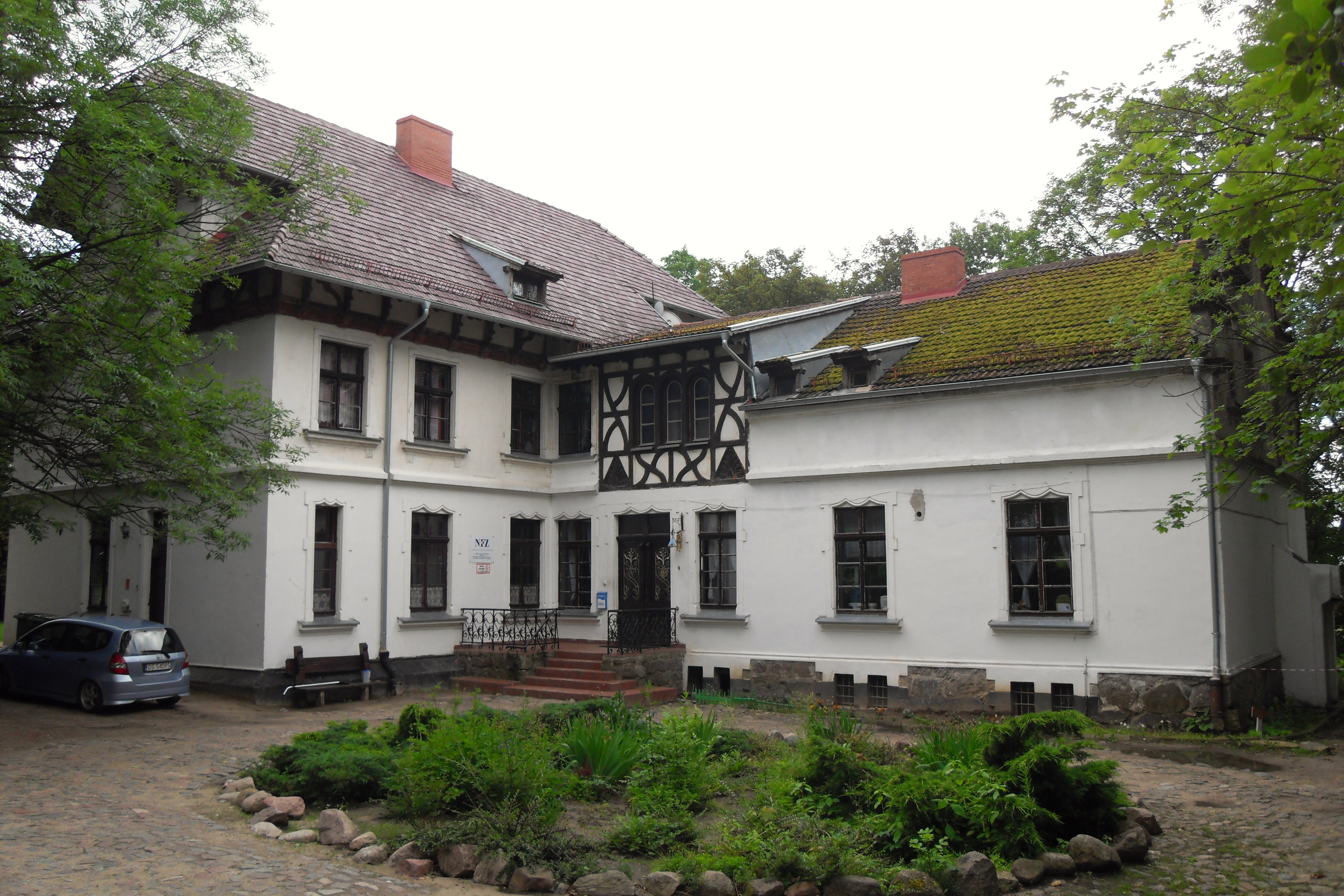
Historic manor house

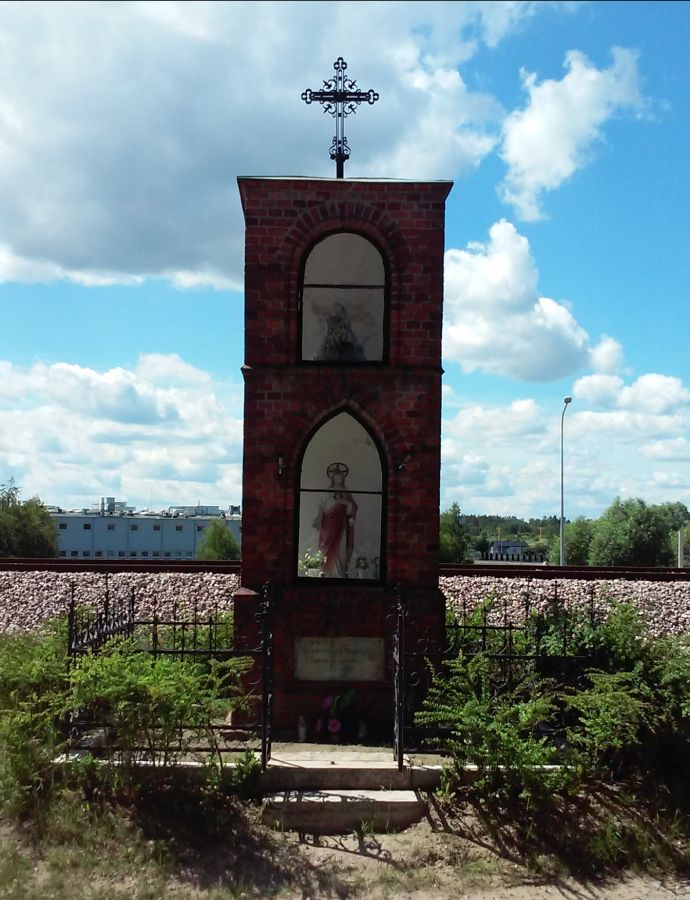
Old wayside shrine
