= Kokoszki =

Coordinates: 54°21′15″N 18°29′29″E

- District (dzielnica)
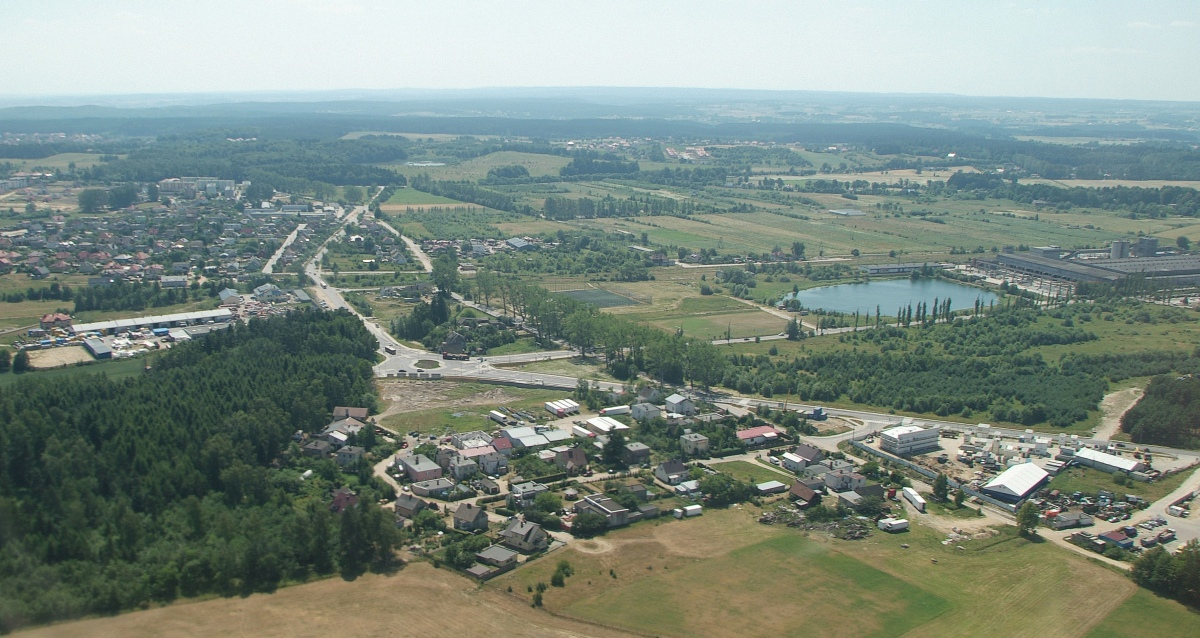
- Aerial view of Kokoszki

- Location of Kokoszki within Gdańsk
- Country: Poland
- Voivodeship: Pomeranian
- County/City: Gdańsk
- Within city limits: 1973

Area
  - Total: 19.94 km^{2} (7.70 sq mi)

Population (2019)
  - Total: 9,693
  - Density: 486.1/km^{2} (1,259/sq mi)
- Time zone: UTC+1 (CET)
  - Summer (DST): UTC+2 (CEST)

Kokoszki (Polish pronunciation: [kɔˈkɔʂkʲi]; German: Kokoschken; Kashubian: Kòkòszczi) is a district of Gdańsk, Poland. It is the city's westernmost district.

== Location ==
Kokoszki borders Matarnia to the north, Jasień to the east, Gmina Kolbudy to the south, and Gmina Żukowo to the west. It comprises the quarters (osiedla) of Bysewo, Kokoszki, Karczemki, Kiełpino Górne, Las Sulmiński, and Smęgorzyno. It also contains part of Rębiechowo, sharing it with Matarnia.

== History ==
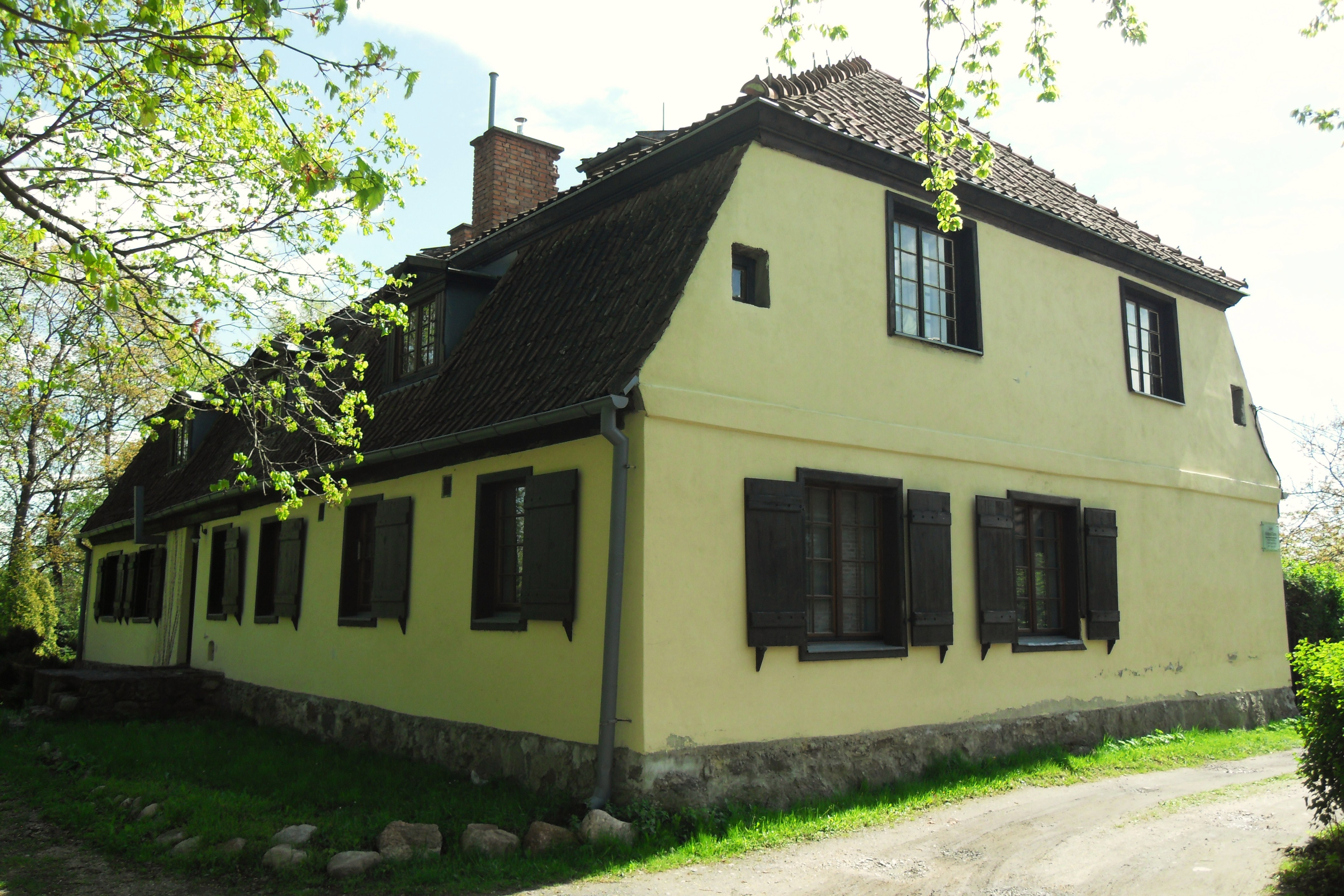
19th-century grange

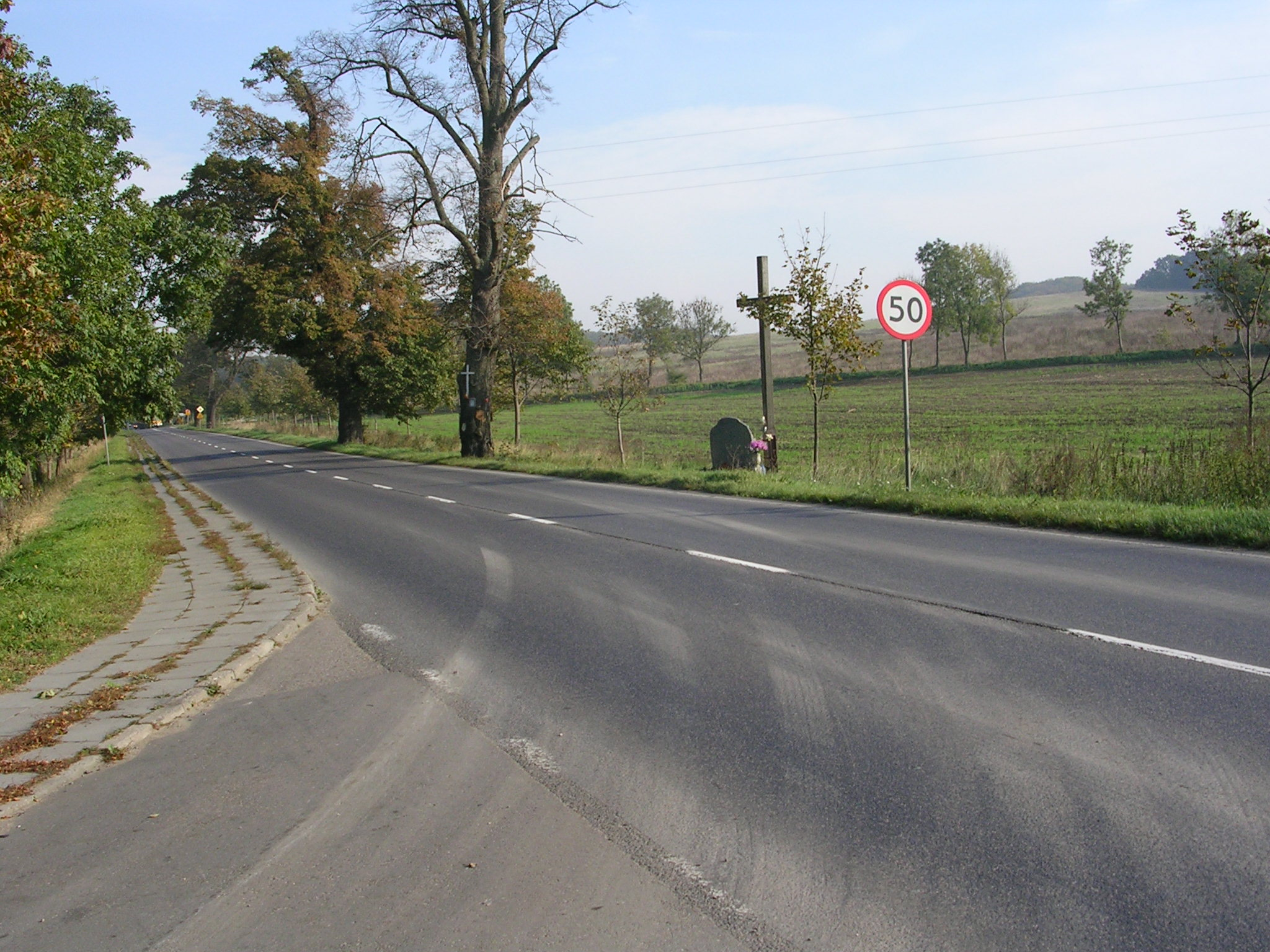
Site of the Poland bus disaster of 1994, which occurred in Kokoszki

The first settlement known to have existed in today's Kokoszki is Koprzywno, first recorded in 1342 and destroyed in the Thirteen Years' War. The village of Kokoszki, established near the location of Koprzywno, was first written down in the 16th century. It was also alternatively known as Burggrafin.

It was inherited by various owners from the nobility and remained a small village until Justus Heinrich Rümker received ownership of Kokoszki in 1868, known in German as Kokoschken, from Bernhard von Weickhmann, the previous owner, who had died from cholera. Rümker built up light industry in Kokoschken, primarily focused around agricultural products. By the 1880s, the population numbered 170 people. A sizeable grange was constructed in the town in the 19th century.

In 1914, a train line was opened to Stara Piła station, located near Kokoschken. It became part of the Second Polish Republic after World War I, but returned to German hands in 1939 and was renamed Klein Bessa. A subcamp of Stalag XX-A was operational in the area during World War II, as well as a subcamp of the Stutthof concentration camp established in September 1944. The subcamp was extremely brutal, which was a common characteristic of many such facilities, and its prisoners worked 12-hour shifts at the Schichau-Werke shipyard.

On 23 March 1945, the village was taken by the Red Army and was incorporated into Gdańsk's city boundaries in 1973. In 1994, a bus disaster occurred in Kokoszki, resulting in 32 deaths and 43 injuries.
