= Siedlce, Gdańsk =

Siedlce
- District (dzielnica)
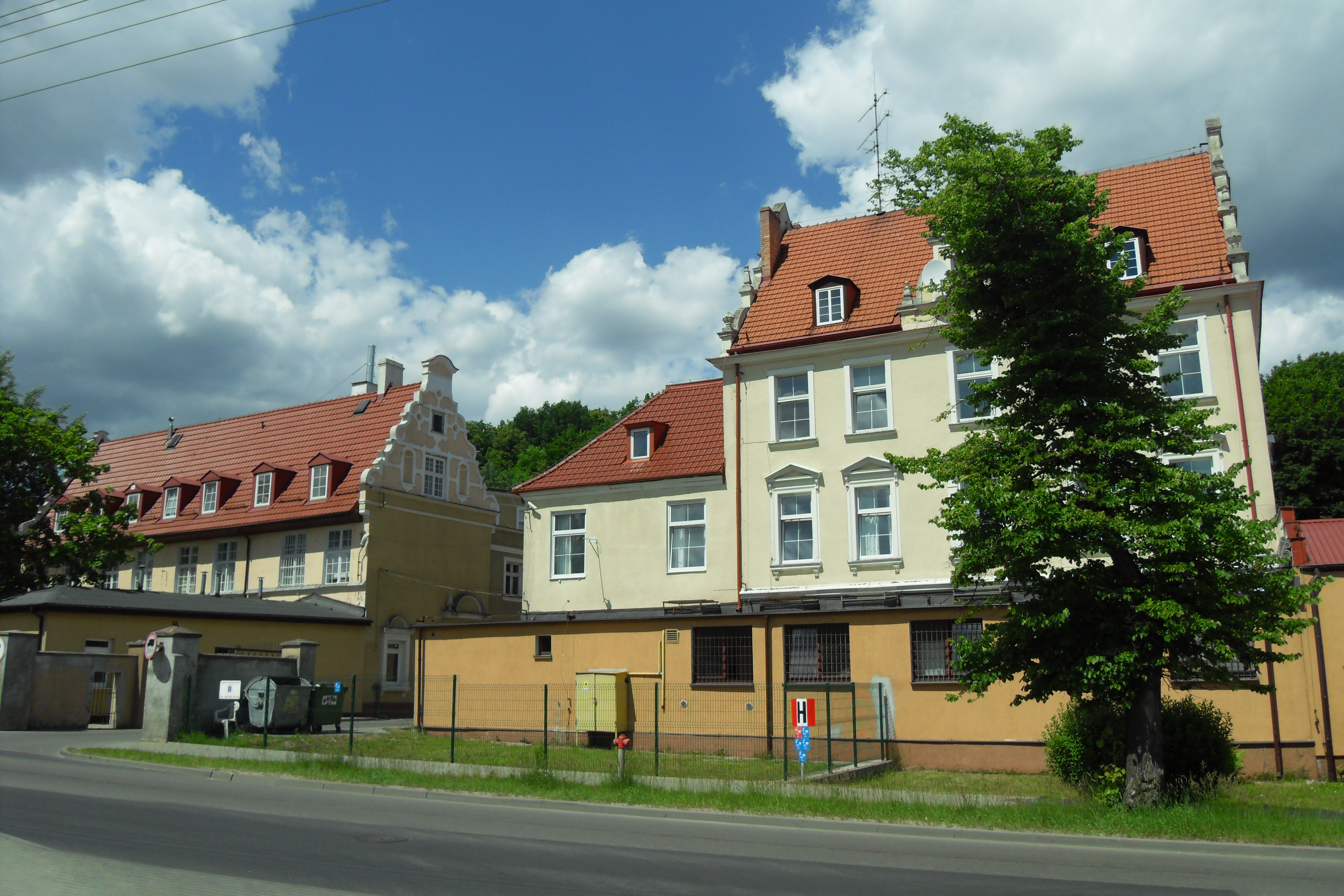

- Location of Siedlce within Gdańsk
- Coordinates: 54°20′49″N 18°37′02″E
- Country: Poland
- Voivodeship: Pomeranian
- County/City: Gdańsk
- Within city limits: 1814

Area
  - Total: 2.58 km^{2} (1.00 sq mi)

Population (2019)
  - Total: 12,473
  - Density: 4,830/km^{2} (12,500/sq mi)
- Time zone: UTC+1 (CET)
  - Summer (DST): UTC+2 (CEST)
- Vehicle registration: GD

Siedlce [ˈɕɛdlt͡sɛ] is a district of the city of Gdańsk, Poland, located to the west of the city centre.

== Location ==
Siedlce borders Piecki-Migowo, Suchanino, and Aniołki to the north, Śródmieście to the west, Chełm and Wzgórze Mickiewicza to the south, and Ujeścisko-Łostowice to the east. The quarters (osiedla) of the district are Dolina, Emaus, Krzyżowniki, Szkódka, Winniki, and Ziemica.

== History ==
Siedlce was first mentioned in 1280, in the context of the Siedlce Stream (fluvium Schedelicz). The first mention of the town itself occurs in 1379. The town's population was mostly concentrated in the valley, owned up until 1396 by Saint Catherine's Church, and then Saint Bridget's. In 1454, the Polish king Kazimierz Jagiellończyk gave the village to the city of Gdańsk.

Siedlce was burnt down in 1433 during the Hussite expedition to the Baltic, and then again in 1462 by the Teutonic Knights. In 1472, after a dispute over control of the local government, the Bridgettines prevailed. In the 16th century, an influx of settlers arrived in the village. In 1593, with the fall of the local Bridgettine abbey during the Reformation, the Bishop of Włocławek took control over Siedlce.

The dispute over ownership would continue until an agreement was reached in 1643. Siedlce was also repeatedly destroyed, including in 1461, 1520, 1576, and 1577. During the Siege of Gdańsk in 1577, fighting took place in the area. Siedlce was used as a "shield" for the city, burnt down by the defenders during the siege of 1655–1660 in 1656, and again in 1734, during another siege.

In 1814, Siedlce, now known by its German name of Schidlitz, was incorporated into Danzig's city boundaries. It slowly grew as workers from the city moved into the area. By 1880, Schidlitz had 5,830 inhabitants. In 1887, a horse tramway from the city centre was opened, electrified in 1896. By 1914, that number had increased to 11,475. The interwar years saw an escalation of urbanization in the once rural Schidlitz, which was now in the Free City of Danzig. It was a largely working-class neighbourhood, and its inhabitants were of diverse occupations, including shipyard workers, railmen, and merchants.

== Gallery ==
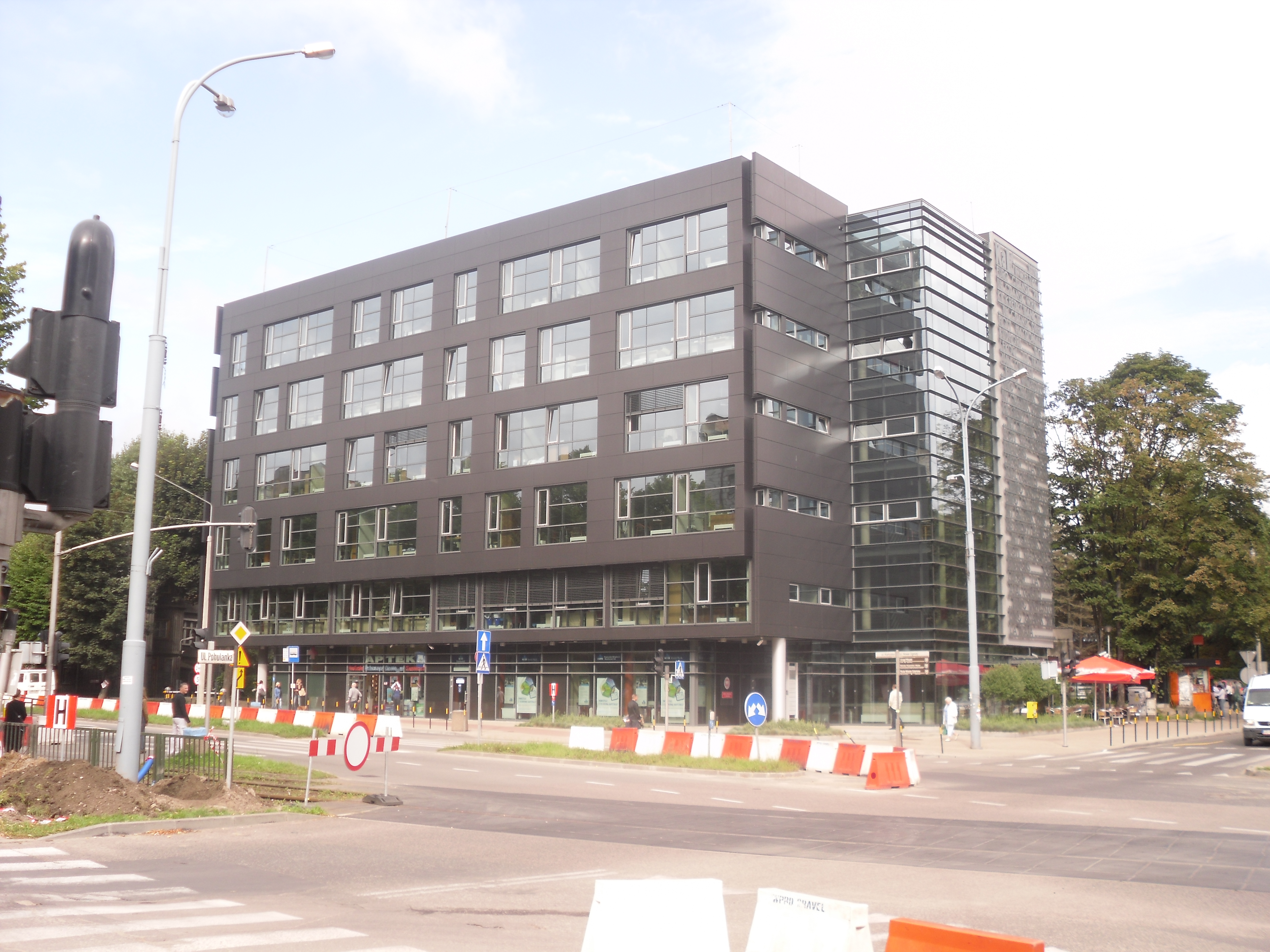
Ka5 (Kartuska 5), a modern office building

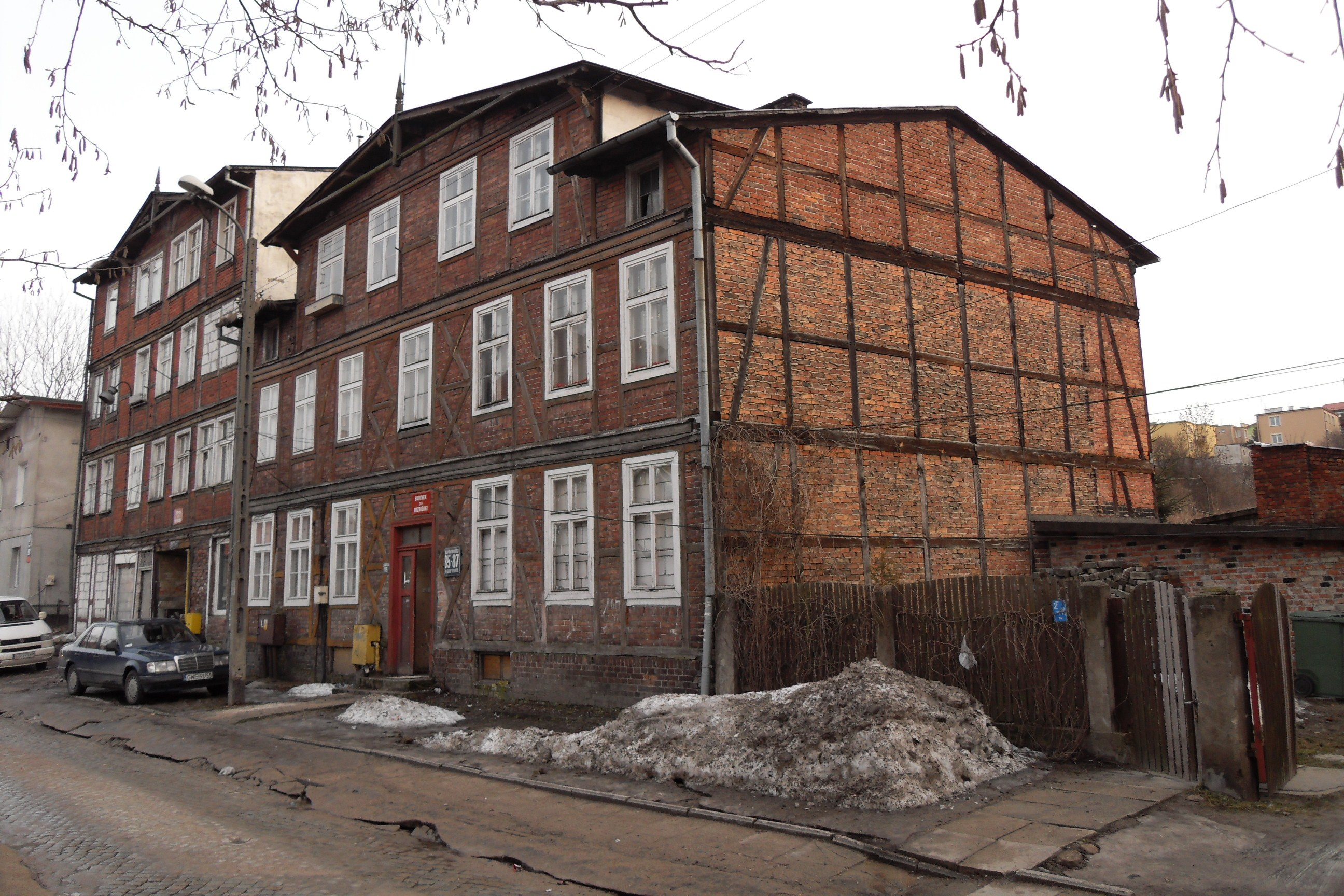
Old townhouses

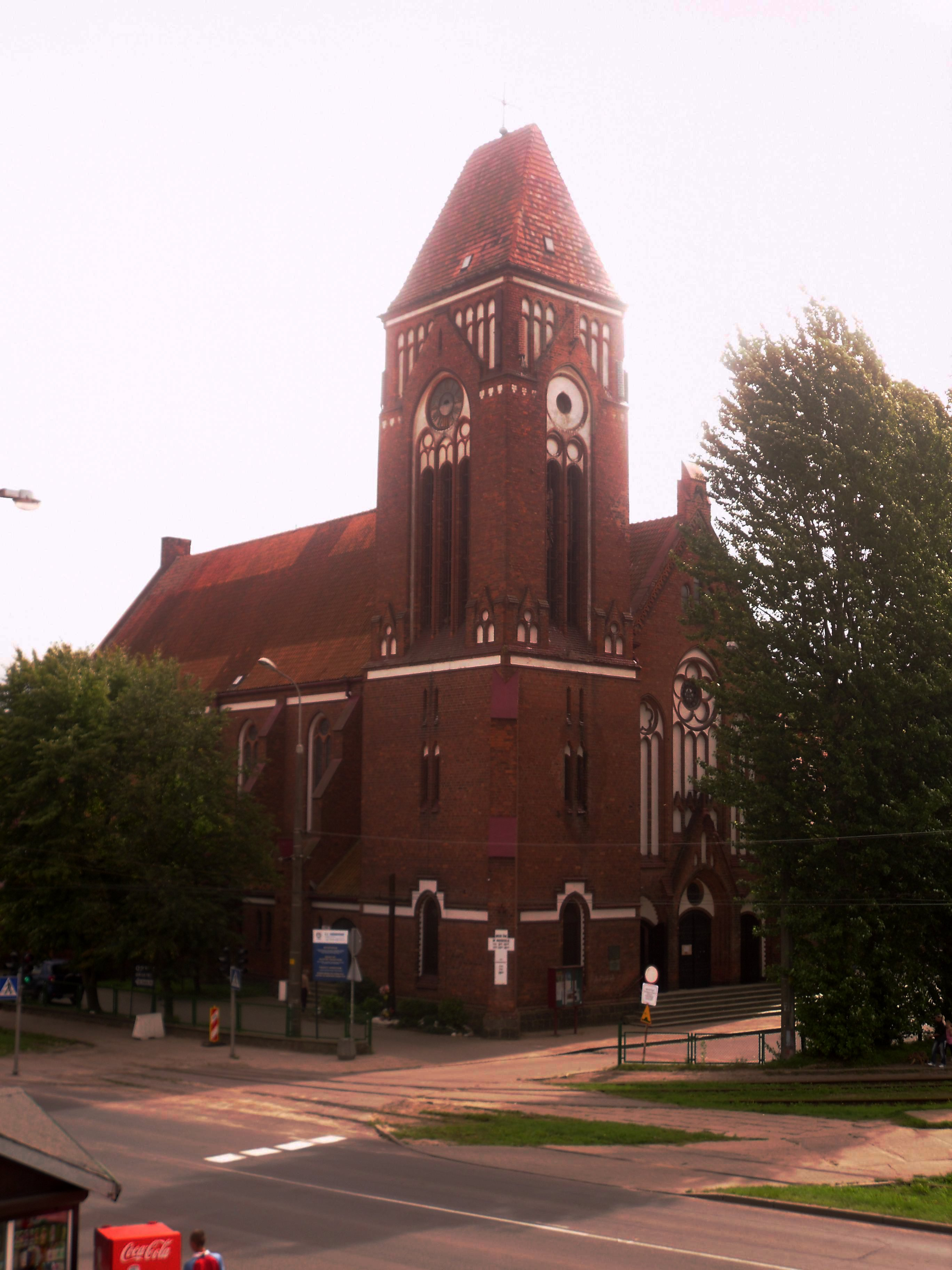
Notable church, dedicated to Francis of Assisi

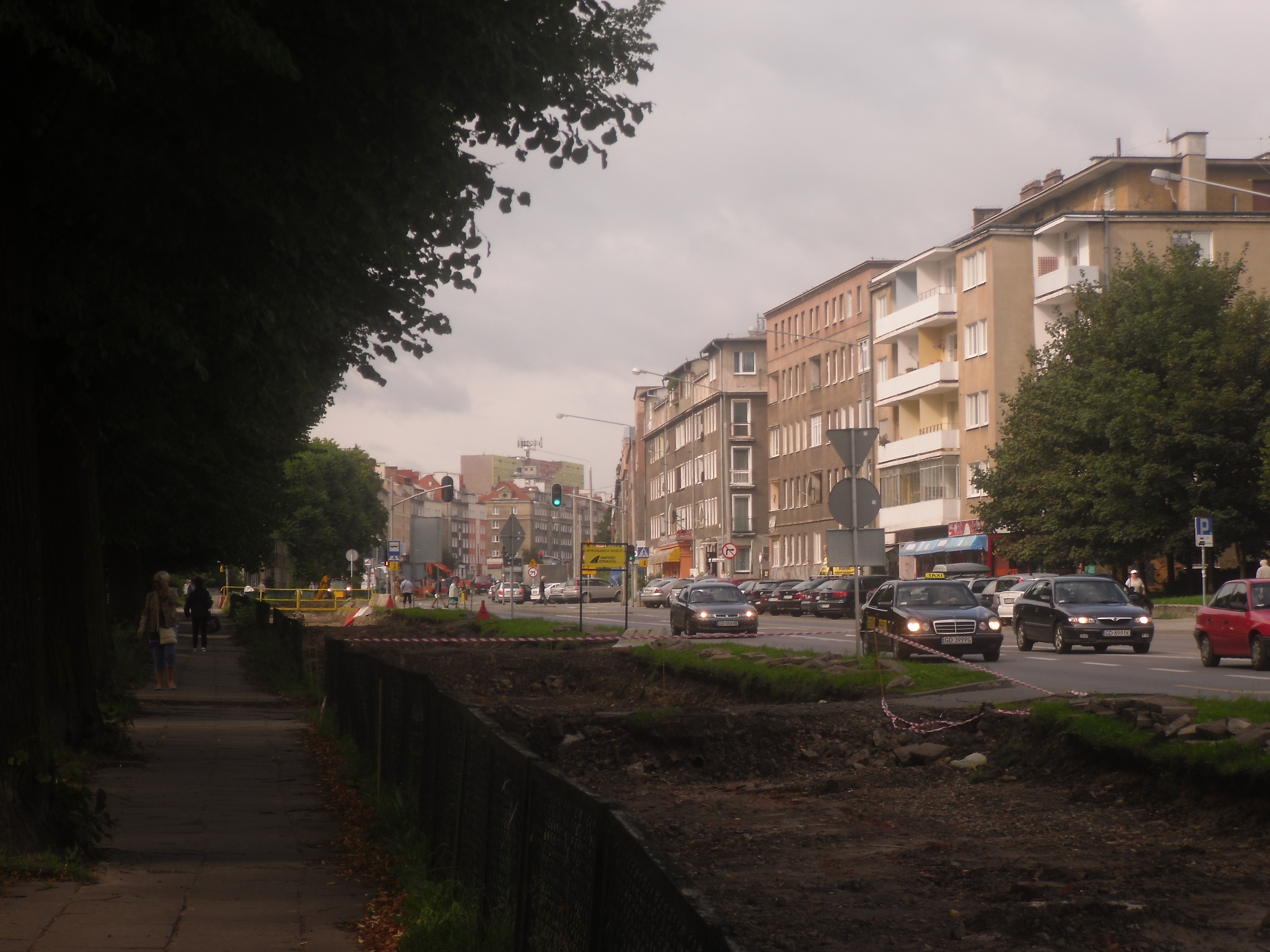
Kartuska Street, running through the centre of the district
