= Mevo (bicycle sharing system) =

Bike rental system in Tricity, Poland

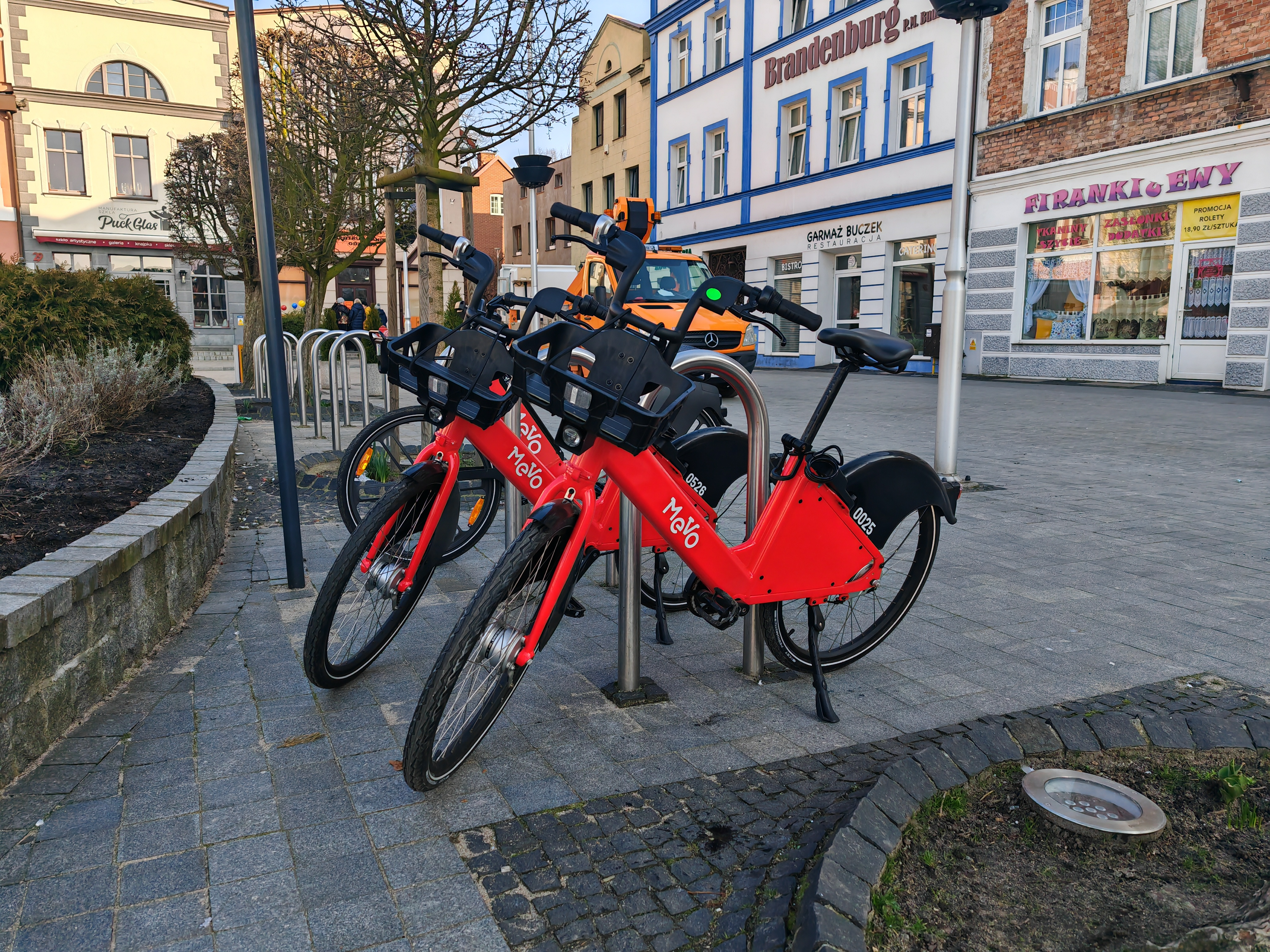
- Mevo bicycles in Puck (in the foreground are two non-electric bikes, and partly obscured behind them is a model with battery-powered motor assistance)

Overview
- Owner: Gdańsk-Gdynia-Sopot Metropolitan Area
- Area served: Tricity
- Transit type: Bicycle-sharing system
- Number of stations: 717
- Website: rowermevo.pl

Operation
- Began operation: 1 March 2019; 7 years ago (first phase); 16 November 2019; 7 years ago (second phase)
- Ended operation: 28 October 2019; 7 years ago (first phase)
- Number of vehicles: 5,299 (August 2025)

Mevo is a bicycle-sharing system which has operated in the Tricity area in Poland since 2023, also operating from March to October 2019.

== Etymology ==
The name comes from Esperanto mevo, meaning seagull. The name was chosen as an international interpretation of a symbol for the Tricity area.

== Fleet specifications ==
Mevo bikes are relatively heavy. The bikes have 26-inch wheels and are equipped with a three-speed transmission. A basket is at the front. The seat can be regulated. The bikes also have a centrally-located footpeg; its rear wheel was equipped with an o-lock, which could be unlocked manually after the bike was rented. As of August 2025, the fleet numbered 5,299 bicycles, of which three-fourth were electrically powered.

== History ==
On 18 June 2018, 14 gminas from the Gdańsk-Gdynia-Sopot Metropolitan Area signed a contract with the company NB Tricity, a subsidiary of Nextbike, to create a bike rental system for the Tricity metropolitan area. The system was to consist of 4,080 e-bikes, available on the streets of Gdańsk, Gdynia, Sopot, Tczew, Puck, Reda, Kartuzy, Sierakowice, Somonino, Stężyca, Władysławowo, Żukowo, Pruszcz Gdański, and Rumia. It was financed by the European Union at the cost of 17 million zł.

According to the initial agreement, the system was to open on 18 November 2018 with 1,224 bikes, which was delayed to 18 January 2019, with the full launch date being 1 March 2019. After initial testing, it was found that the system was not ready for launch, although the full launch date remained scheduled for 1 March. That date was not the release date, with the bikes being rolled out on 26 March instead.

On 31 March, because of issues with battery charging, the system was suspended for one day. On 5 April, the possibility of activating an account on the bike system's mobile app and paying for the rental bikes was suspended due to very large amounts of traffic; additionally, repeated incidents of vandalism and misuse of the bikes became prominent issues. The ability to pay was restored on 24 April, but with a limit in place. Out of the original 1,200 bikes, all of them were only available on launch day, and by 27 April, only 47% were available.

By May 2019, the amount of fines placed upon NB Tricity had exceeded 4 million zł. Reasons for fines included delays of both release phases, low availability of bikes, turning off all payments, inappropriate relocations, dysfunctional programming, and not sending financial reports in time.

On 14 June 2019, 200 more bikes joined the network, with the planned date for all of them being released being before 18 August 2019, but this promise was once again not upheld. On 4 October, Nextbike requested 90% of its debt to be forgiven and it being given the ability to pay off the rest within twelve monthly installments, but the local government declined.

On 28 October 2019, because of NB Tricity's increasing financial troubles, the Gdańsk-Gdynia-Sopot Metropolitan Area terminated the contract, ending Nextbike's ability to operate bike rentals there. In the spring of 2020, a consortium of the companies BikeU and Freebike, the Spanish company Marfina, and Nextbike entered into a dialogue regarding the reopening of the Mevo network. Initially, it was planned to reopen the network by autumn 2021, but that start date was discarded; after further negotiations, in 2022, it was decided that the Spanish company Bike City Global SA, in a partnership with the Italian Vaimoo, with the assistance of the Polish Geovelo, would be the new operator of Mevo for the six upcoming years.

On 13 September 2023, the revived Mevo system was opened to testing. On 16 November, Mevo began full operation once again, charging 29 zł monthly or 259 zł yearly. Proving a success relative to the first project, it expanded in 1 December 2023. On 5 February 2025, a large fire started in a magazine in Przeróbka; the building contained more than 1,500 Mevo e-bikes. An expansion of the fleet is in effect, and as of August 2025, it consists of 5,299 bicycles, beating its previous records.
