= Hussite expedition to the Baltic =

1433 Hussite military campaign

- Part of the Polish–Teutonic War (1431–1435), Hussite Wars and Glorious Raids
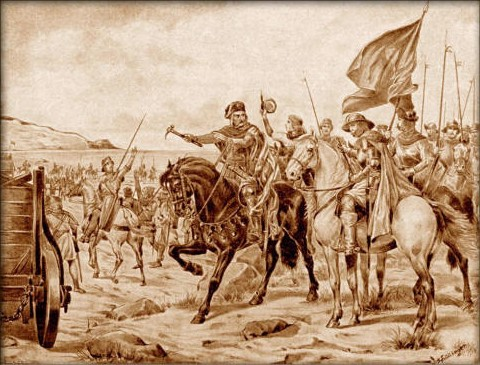
- Čechové u moře Baltského (Czechs on the shore of the Baltic Sea) by Hugo Schüllinger
Date	1433
Location	State of the Teutonic Order
Result	Hussite–Polish victory

Combatants
Orphans; Polish Crown; Duchy of Stolp	State of the Teutonic Order; Bohemian mercenaries

Commanders and leaders
Jan Čapek of Sány; Petr Šafraněc; Mikołaj z Michałowa; Sędziwój Ostroróg; Bogislav IX	Erasmus Fischborn; Paul von Rusdorf

The Hussite expedition to the Baltic (Polish: Husycka wyprawa nad Bałtyk; Czech: Husitské tažení k Baltu) was a military campaign, or "glorious ride", carried out by the Orphans, a radical Hussite group, led by Jan Čapek of Sány on the side of Władysław II Jagiełło during the Polish–Teutonic War of 1431–1435.

== Origins and causes ==
During the Hussite Wars, the State of the Teutonic Order had supported Catholic leaders, including Sigismund, Holy Roman Emperor, in the fight against the Hussites. In 1432, a war of succession began in Lithuania, with the Teutonic Order backing Jagiełło's opponent, which triggered the start of a war between the Kingdom of Poland and the Teutonic Order.

In the 1430s, crop failures across Bohemia had resulted in many Hussite knights having to support themselves outside of means within the region. Thus, a reasonable option for earning such income was going on campaign outside of the country. In summer 1432, after a meeting in Pabianice, King of Poland Władysław II Jagiełło managed to come to an agreement with the Sirotci wherein the latter would be provided by the King with wages and supplies as mercenaries in exchange for assisting the Poles militarily.

== Course of the campaign ==
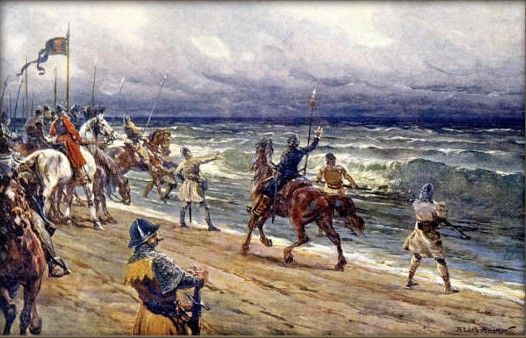
Čechové na Baltu (Czechs on the shore of the Baltic) by Adolf Liebscher

The Sirotci army set off from Bohemia in late April 1433. It consisted of 7,000 infantrymen, 700 cavalrymen, and 350 war wagons. After the army crossed the flooded Oder River, it was joined by the commander Petr Šafraněc, who provided a further 200 troops. It then arrived in the border town of Santok and entered the Neumark region.

Here, the Sirotci took the town of Friedeberg (Strzelce Krajeńskie) on 10 June. After they burnt three Catholic clergymen alive, 12 more towns in the Neumark surrendered, including Woldenberg (Dobiegniew). After arriving at the gates of the well-fortified city of Landsberg (Gorzów Wielkopolski), the army was joined by Sędziwój Ostroróg, the voivode of Poznań. However, the combined armies could not breach the city's defences, causing them to continue to the Baltic Sea. They took Soldin (Myślibórz), Königsberg in der Neumark (Chojna), and Arnswalde (Choszczno).

In mid-June, the expedition was joined by Pomeranian noble Bogislav IX, who was supported by the city of Stargard, as well as several Pomeranian nobles. The Sirotci and their Polish allies then entered the territory of the Teutonic Order and approached Schlochau (Człuchów). They advanced further on 6 July to besiege the fortress of Konitz (Chojnice) alongside Mikołaj z Michałowa, the leader of the Polish army which accompanied them.

The city, commanded by Erasmus Fischborn, was well-fortified, and the Sirotici had no artillery. Whilst the Polish commander wanted to attack and conquer the city unconditionally, the Hussite commander, Jan Čapek, disagreed with them and insisted on negotiation. The Polish forced an attack, which turned out to be a complete failure. The expedition then left Konitz for the core of Teutonic territory.

After plundering the Cistercian abbey in Pelplin, the Sirotci and their allies besieged the fortress of Dirschau (Tczew), which, due to a fire, was captured on 29 August, after only the first attack. The city was plundered, and Bohemian mercenaries fighting for the Teutonic Order were burnt at the stake. The force arrived near Danzig (Gdańsk) on 1 September, but did not even attempt a siege. After four days, the set out for the nearby Baltic Sea, burning the Oliwa Abbey. According to chroniclers, the men played by the sea like small children and filled their water bottles with sea water. Some of the Sirotci were knighted near the shore.

The army retreated to Stargard, and then left, returning to Bohemia through late 1433. The Sirotci visited the court of the Polish king, who paid them handsomely, and they returned to their homeland with a large fortune.

== Results ==
The expedition to the Baltic was probably the most famous and successful campaign of the Hussites beyond the borders of Bohemia. Nevertheless, an insufficient amount of supplies was brought back from the pillaging, and another crop failure in 1433 threatened a famine.

== Sources ==
Čornej, Petr (1987). Tajemství českých kronik. Prague: Vyšehrad. ISBN 80-7185-590-1.
Macek, Josef (1952). Husité na Baltu a ve Velkopolsku. Prague: Rovnost.
Šmahel, František (1993). Husitská revoluce. 3. díl. Prague: Historický ústav AV ČR. ISBN 80-85268-27-2.
