= VII Dwór =

City district of Gdańsk, Poland

- District (dzielnica)
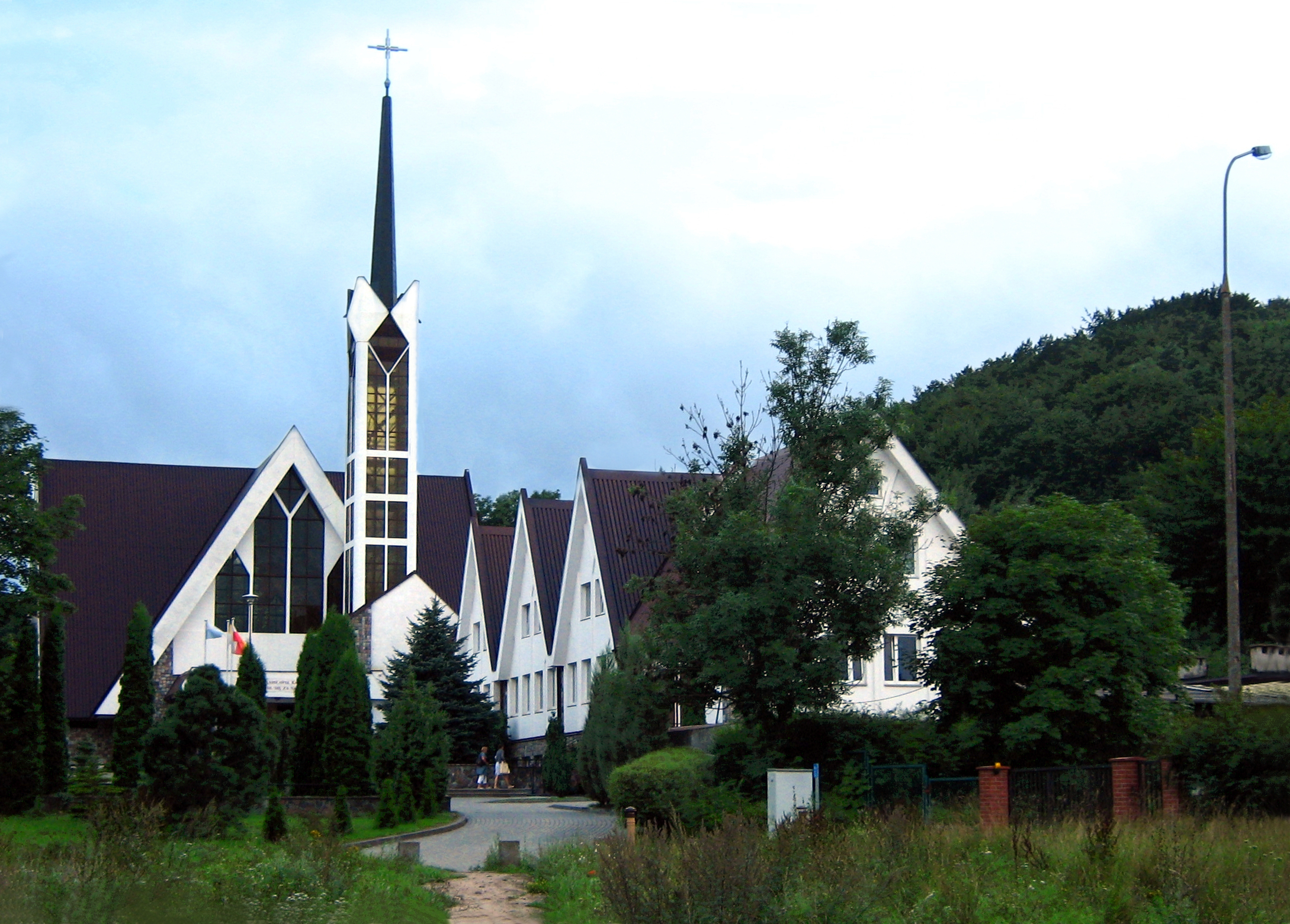
- The Church of St. Stanislaus Kostka, with the Oliwa forests in the background

- Location of VII Dwór within Gdańsk
- Coordinates: 54°23′12″N 18°34′33″E
- Country: Poland
- Voivodeship: Pomeranian
- County/City: Gdańsk
- Within city limits: 1926

Area
  - Total: 2.90 km^{2} (1.12 sq mi)

Population (2021)
  - Total: 3,560
  - Density: 1,230/km^{2} (3,180/sq mi)
- Time zone: UTC+1 (CET)
  - Summer (DST): UTC+2 (CEST)
- Vehicle registration: GD

VII Dwór, read as Siódmy Dwór ([ˈɕudmɨ ˈdvur]), is an administrative district (dzielnica) in the city of Gdańsk, Poland. It is located in the city's western areas.

== Location ==
VII Dwór borders Oliwa to the west and north, Strzyża and Wrzeszcz Górny to the east, and Brętowo to the south. It is not divided into any quarters (osiedla).

== History ==
VII Dwór was part of Oliwa and owned by the Oliwa Abbey for much of its history. Dwór VII, the manor which it is named after, was first mentioned in 1632 and was owned by various noble families. A sanatorium was opened in VII Dwór in 1931, which remains operational to this day. A subcamp of the Stalag XX-B prisoner-of-war camp operated there during World War II.

In the 1950s, the area began being developed, mostly with single-family homes, mostly for workers of the Gdańsk University of Technology. A large apartment block housing estate, known as the Osiedle Młodych, was completed in 1963.

== Gallery ==
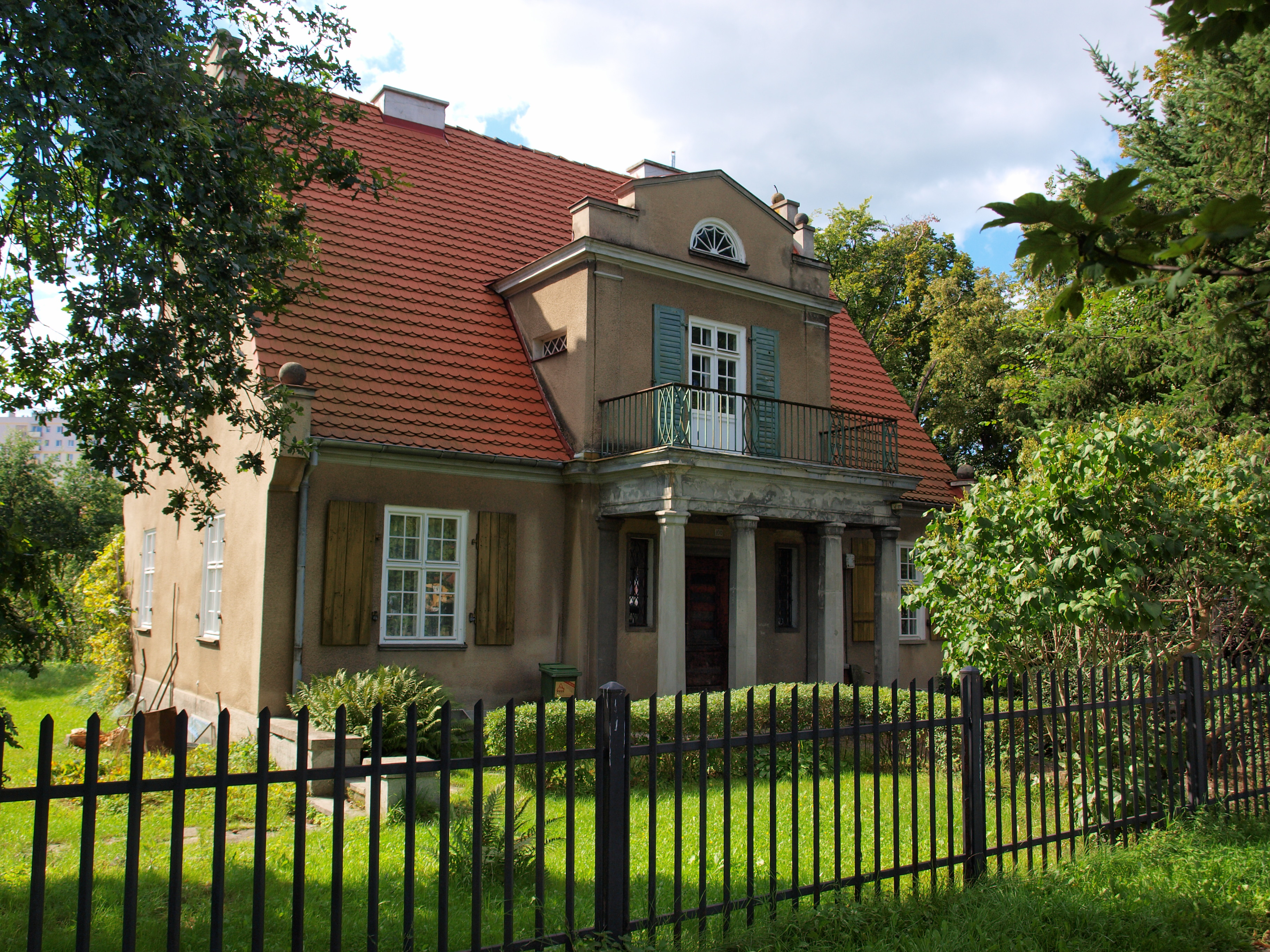
Wita Stwosza 100, an 18th-century villa

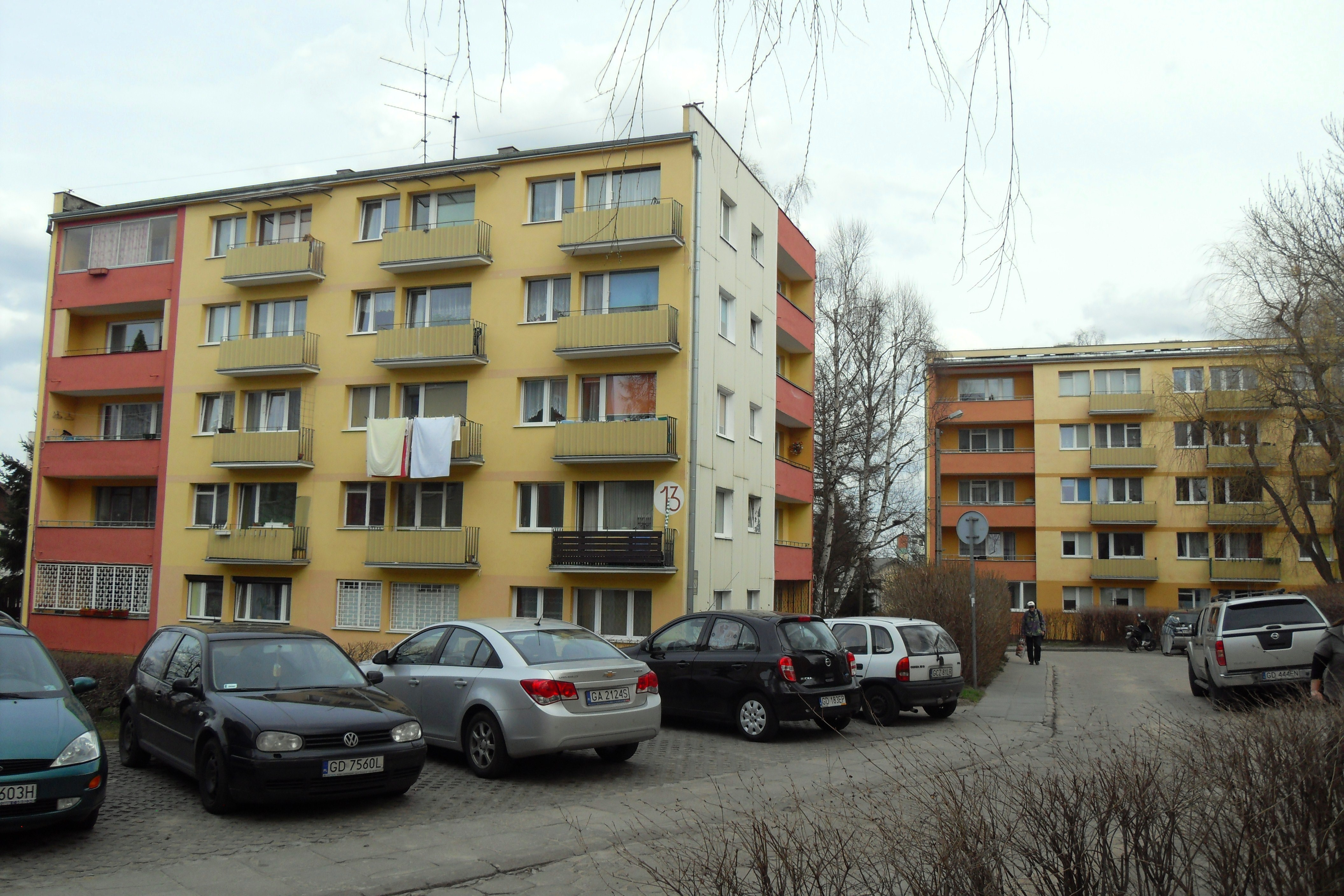
Gryglewski Street (mid-rise block housing)

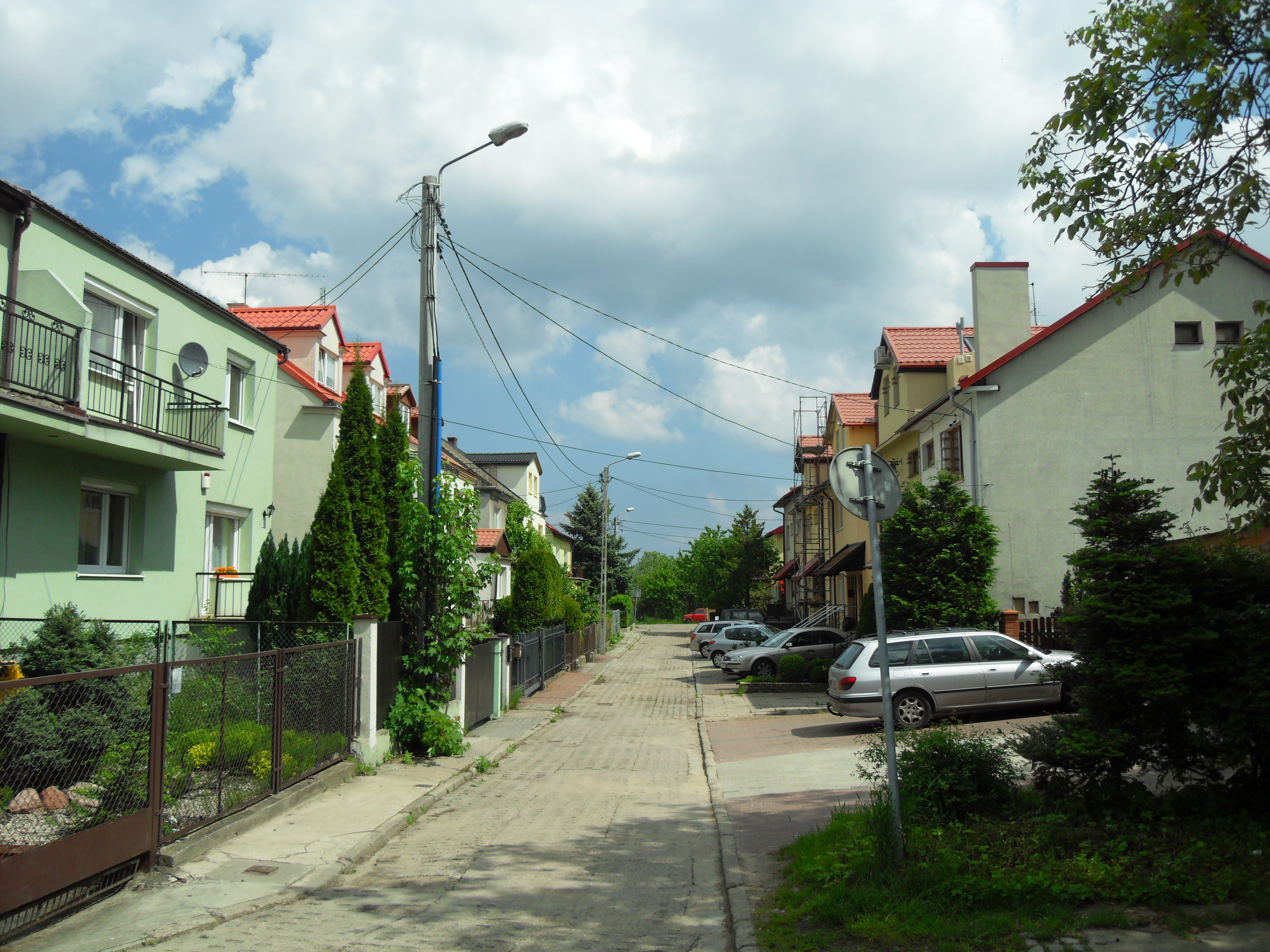
Kurzyński Street (detached single-family housing)

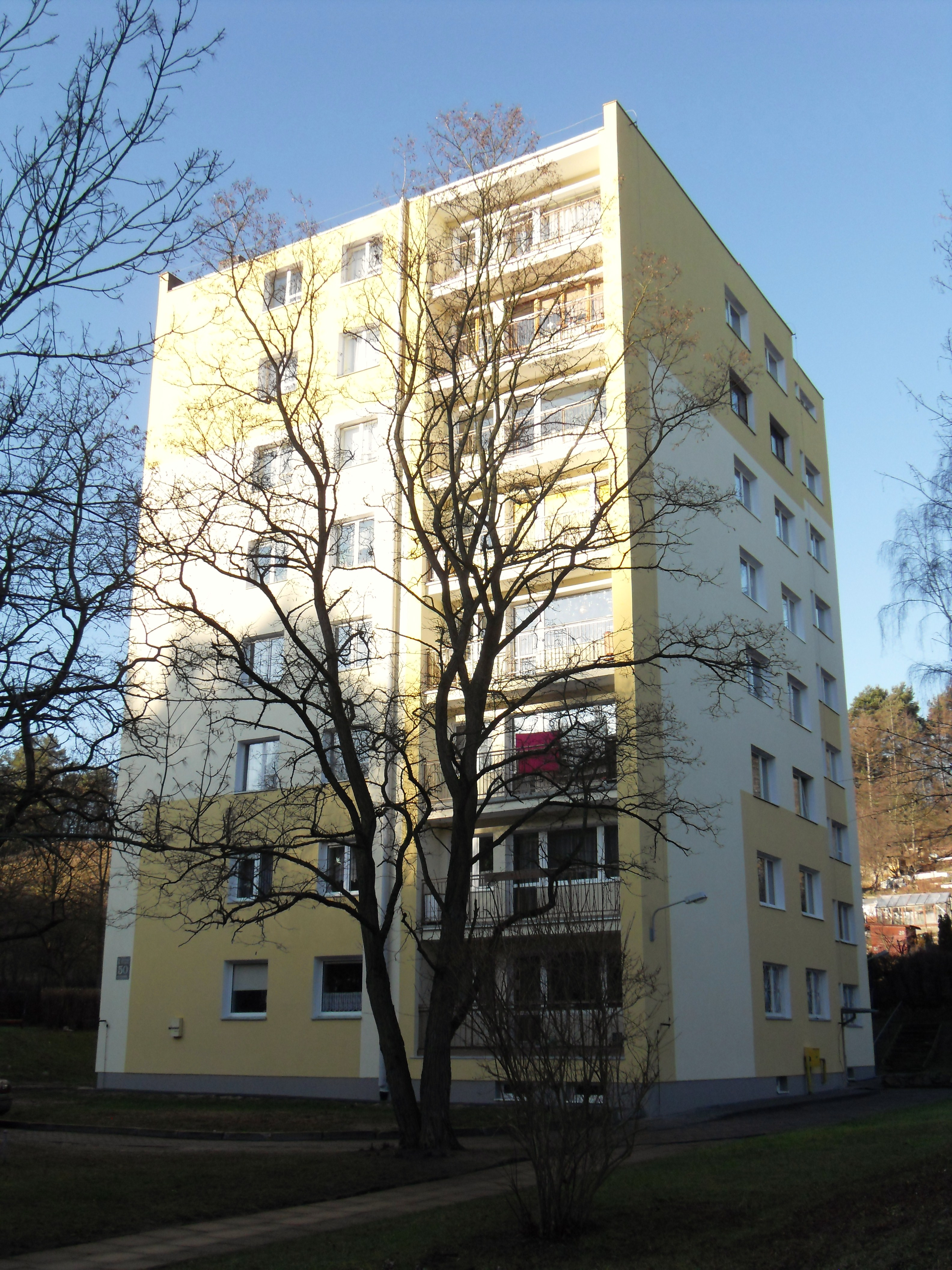
Michałowsski Street (high-rise block housing)
