= Markuszewski =

Markuszewski, feminine: Markuszewska is a Polish toponymic surname derived from one of the places named Markuszewice or Markuszów. Outside Poland it may be spelled as Markuszewsky, Markuschewski, Markushevsky.

- Jerzy Markuszewski
- Michał Markuszewski
