= University Clinical Centre, Gdańsk =

Uniwersyteckie Centrum Kliniczne w Gdańsku
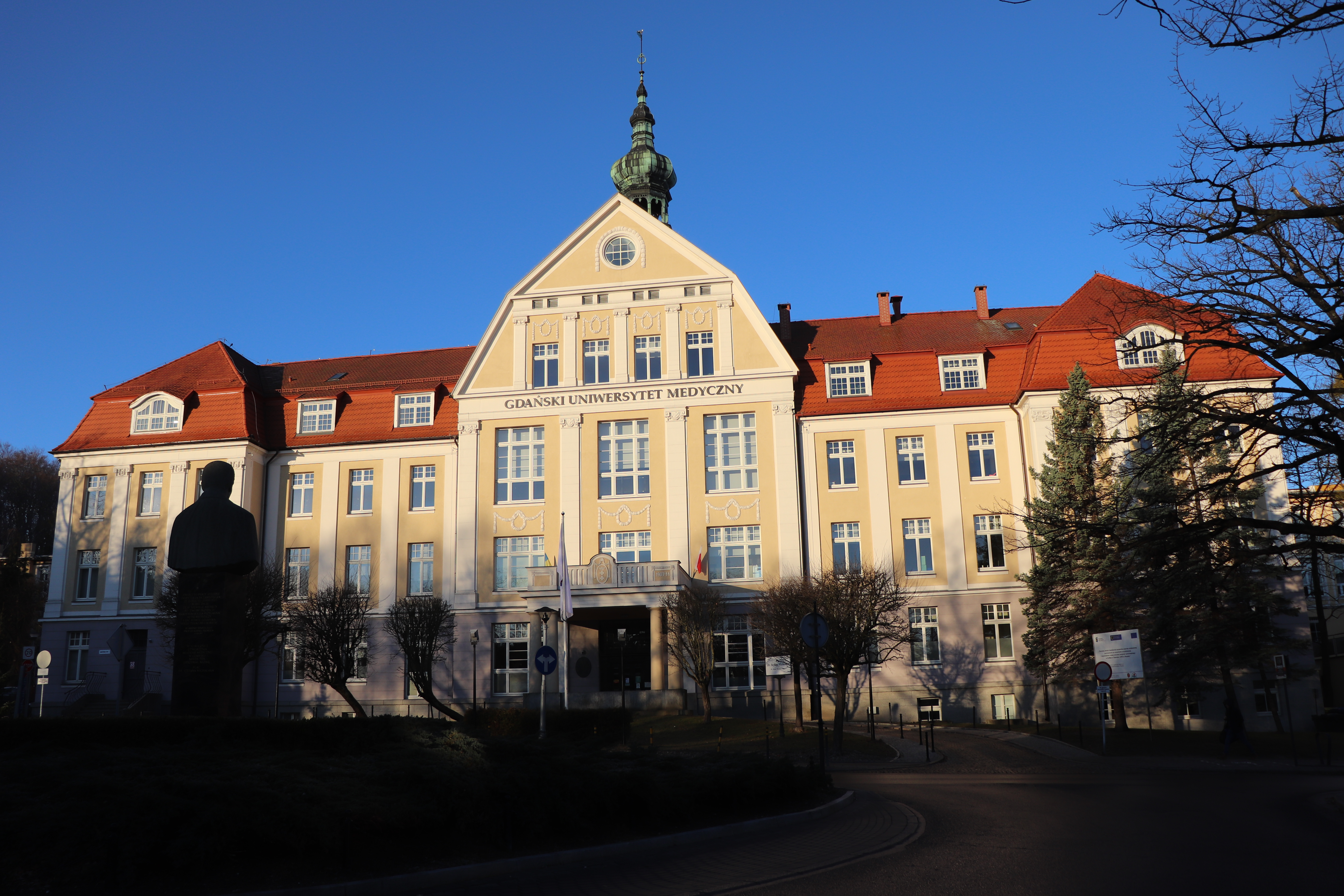
- Dębinki Street representative building, occupied by out-patient clinics

Geography
- Location: Aniołki (main site), Dolny Wrzeszcz (gynaecological and perinatological clinics), Gdańsk, Pomeranian Voivodeship, Poland
- Coordinates: 54.3658400°N 18.6252400°E

Organisation
- Care system: Public
- Type: Teaching
- Affiliated university: Medical University of Gdańsk
- Patron: None

Services
- Standards: Reference level III (Poland)
- Emergency department: Yes
- Speciality: Multi-speciality

Helipads
- Helipad: Yes

Links
- Website: www.uck.gda.pl

The University Clinical Centre in Gdańsk (Polish: Uniwersyteckie Centrum Kliniczne w Gdańsku, abbreviated as UCK) is the main teaching hospital at the Medical University of Gdańsk. It is a multi-speciality hospital, the largest in the north of Poland and one of the largest in the country. It includes the Invasive Medicine Centre, completed in 2011 as one of the most modern medical facilities in Europe and the Non-Invasive Medicine Centre opened in 2018, which houses some of the hospital's in-patient departments, referred to in Polish terminology as clinics.

== Organisational structure of health services ==
In terms of patient treatment, the University Clinical Centre consists of the following in-patient clinics:

=== In-patient clinics ===
- Clinic of Allergology and Pneumology
- Clinic of Anaesthesiology and Intensive Therapy
- Clinic of Thoracic Surgery
- Clinic of General, Endocrine and Transplant Surgery
- Clinic of Oncological Surgery
- Clinic of Plastic Surgery
- Clinic of Orthopaedics
- Clinic of Ophthalmology
- Care and Health Facility - long-term care
- Primary Care
- Clinic of Mental Illnesses and Neurotic Disorders
- Clinical Centre of Cardiology
- Clinic of Otolaryngology with Department of Oral and Maxillofacial Surgery
- Clinic of Internal Diseases, Connective Tissue Diseases and Geriatrics
- Clinic of Endocrinology and Internal Diseases
- Clinic of Dermatology, Venereology and Allergology
- Clinic of Gastroenterology and Hepatology
- Occupational Medicine
- Clinic of Haematology and Transplantology
- Clinic of Cardiac and Vascular Surgery
- Clinic of Paediatric Cardiology and Congenital Heart Defects
- Clinic of Arterial Hypertension and Diabetology
- Clinic of Paediatric and Adolescent Kidney Diseases and Hypertension
- Clinic of Nephrology, Transplantology and Internal Diseases
- Clinic of Neurosurgery
- Clinic of Adult Neurology
- Clinic of Developmental Neurology
- Clinic of Oncology and Radiotherapy
- Clinic of Paediatrics, Haematology and Oncology
- Clinic of Paediatrics, Diabetology and Endocrinology
- Clinic of Rehabilitation
- Clinical Emergency Department
- Clinic of Gynaecology, Oncological Gynaecology and Gynaecological Endocrinology
- Clinic of Obstetrics
- Clinic of Neonatology
- Clinic of Urology
