= Barbara Jereczek =

Barbara Alicja Jereczek-Fossa (née Jereczek) is a Polish-Italian radiation oncologist and medical researcher. She is currently Full Professor of Radiation Oncology at the University of Milan and Chair of the Department of Radiation Oncology at the European Institute of Oncology in Milan, Italy.

== Career and research ==
Jereczek-Fossa received her MD from the Medical University of Gdańsk, Poland in 1992 and from the University of Milan, Italy in 1997. She completed her PhD at the Medical University of Gdańsk in 1996. Her research focuses on urological malignancies, breast cancer, and innovations in radiotherapy.

In 2019, she was named Ambassador of the Medical University of Gdańsk. In 2024, Barbara was elected as the president of the European Society for Radiotherapy and Oncology (ESTRO), set to assume the role in 2026 as the first Polish woman in this role.

Jereczek is listed in Stanford University's World's Top 2% Scientists. She is the author of more than 450 peer-reviewed scientific articles, with an h-index of 56 as of 2024.
