= Wrzeszcz Górny =

- District (dzielnica)
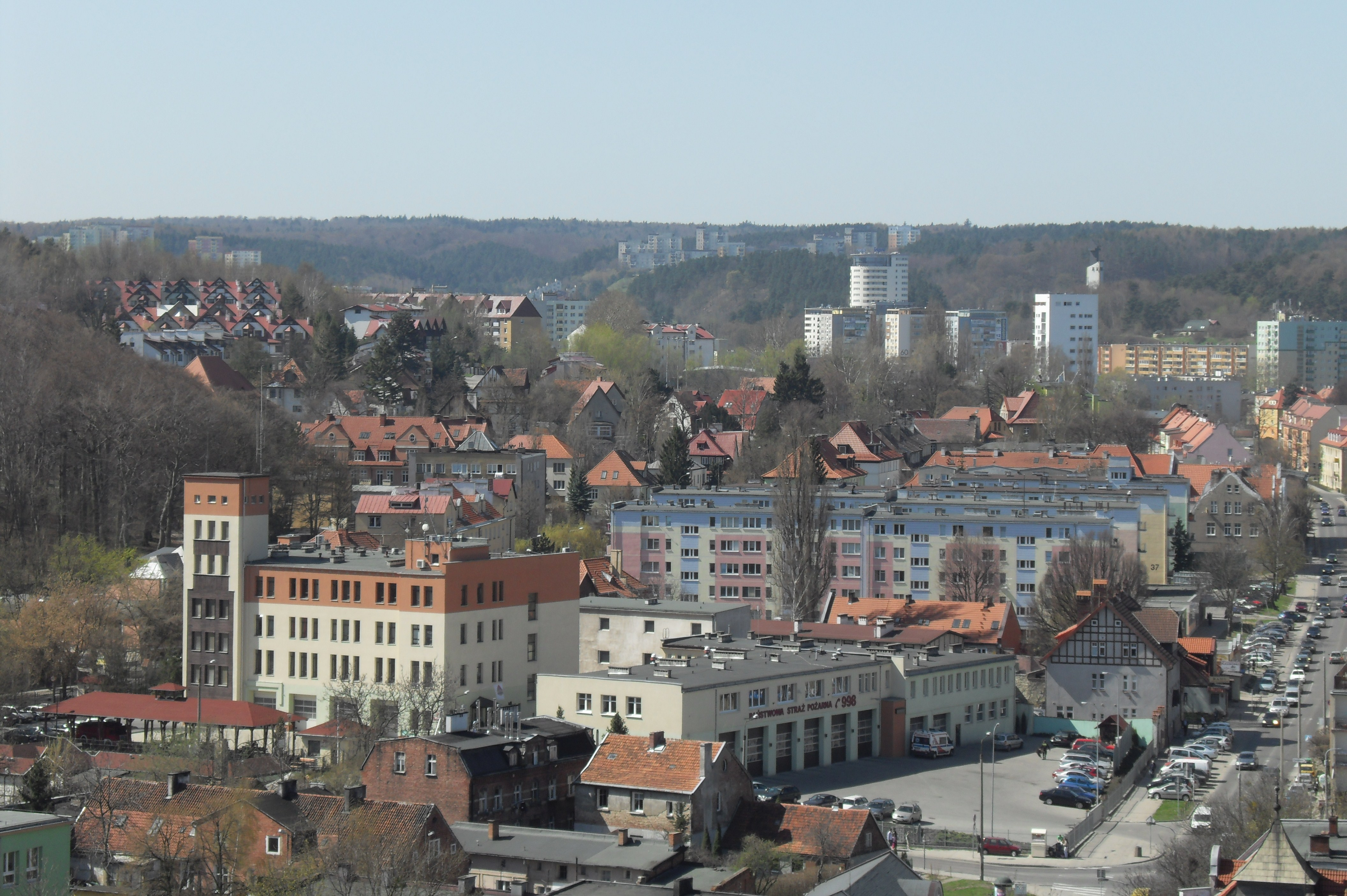
- Wrzeszcz Górny

- Location of Wrzeszcz Górny within Gdańsk
- Coordinates: 54°22′30″N 18°35′44″E
- Country: Poland
- Voivodeship: Pomeranian
- County/City: Gdańsk
- Established: 2010
- Notable landmarks: Góra Strzyska

Area
  - Total: 6.42 km^{2} (2.48 sq mi)
- Elevation: 105 m (344 ft)

Population (2019)
  - Total: 22,118
  - Density: 3,450/km^{2} (8,920/sq mi)
- Time zone: UTC+1 (CET)
  - Summer (DST): UTC+2 (CEST)
- Area code: +48 58

Wrzeszcz Górny (lit. 'Upper Wrzeszcz') is an administrative district (dzielnica administracyjna) of the city of Gdańsk, Poland. It was created in 2010 by division of the district Wrzeszcz (German: Langfuhr) in two districts.

== History ==
In October 2010, some administrative districts of Gdańsk with a population of more than 50,000 had been divided in smaller districts. Wrzeszcz has been divided in Wrzeszcz Dolny and Wrzeszcz Górny.

== Location ==
The district is the south-western and older part of Wrzeszcz. The division was made along the railway line. Góra Strzyska (German: Strießberg) with 105 meters is the highest elevation of Wrzeszcz Górny.

From the north, the district is bordered by the districts of Strzyża, Zaspa-Młyniec and Wrzeszcz Dolny, from the east by Wrzeszcz Dolny and Aniołki, from the south by Suchanino and Piecki-Migowo and from the west by Brętowo and VII Dwór.

== Points of interest ==
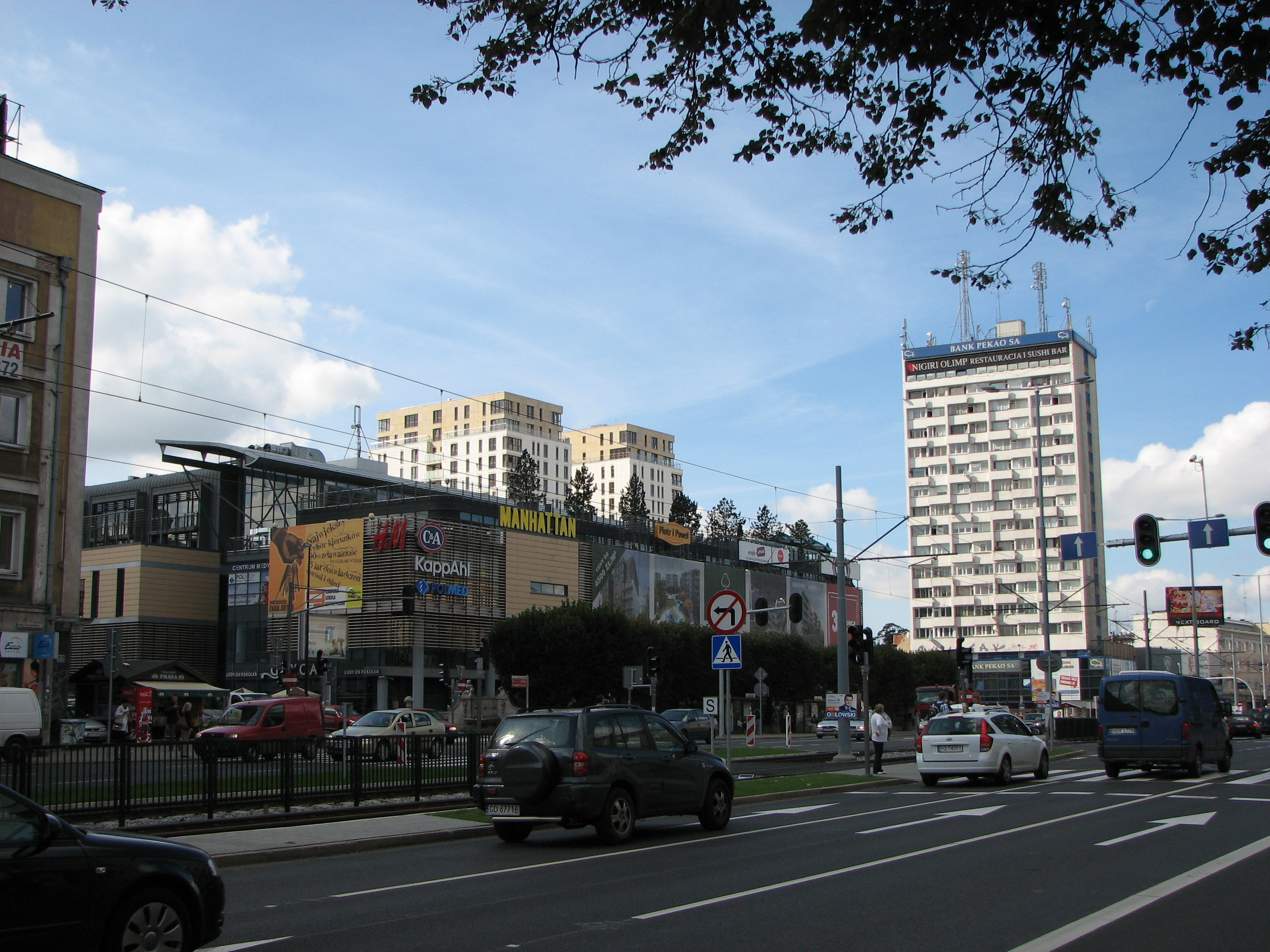
Grunwald alley and Manhattan Shopping Centre

- Gdańsk University of Technology (Politechnika Gdańska)
- Gdańsk Medical University
- Baltic Opera (Opera Bałtycka)
- Gdańsk Wrzeszcz railway station
- Forest Theatre (Teatr Leśny)
