= Strzyża =

Area in Gdańsk, Poland

Coordinates: 54°23′10″N 18°34′54″E

- District (dzielnica)
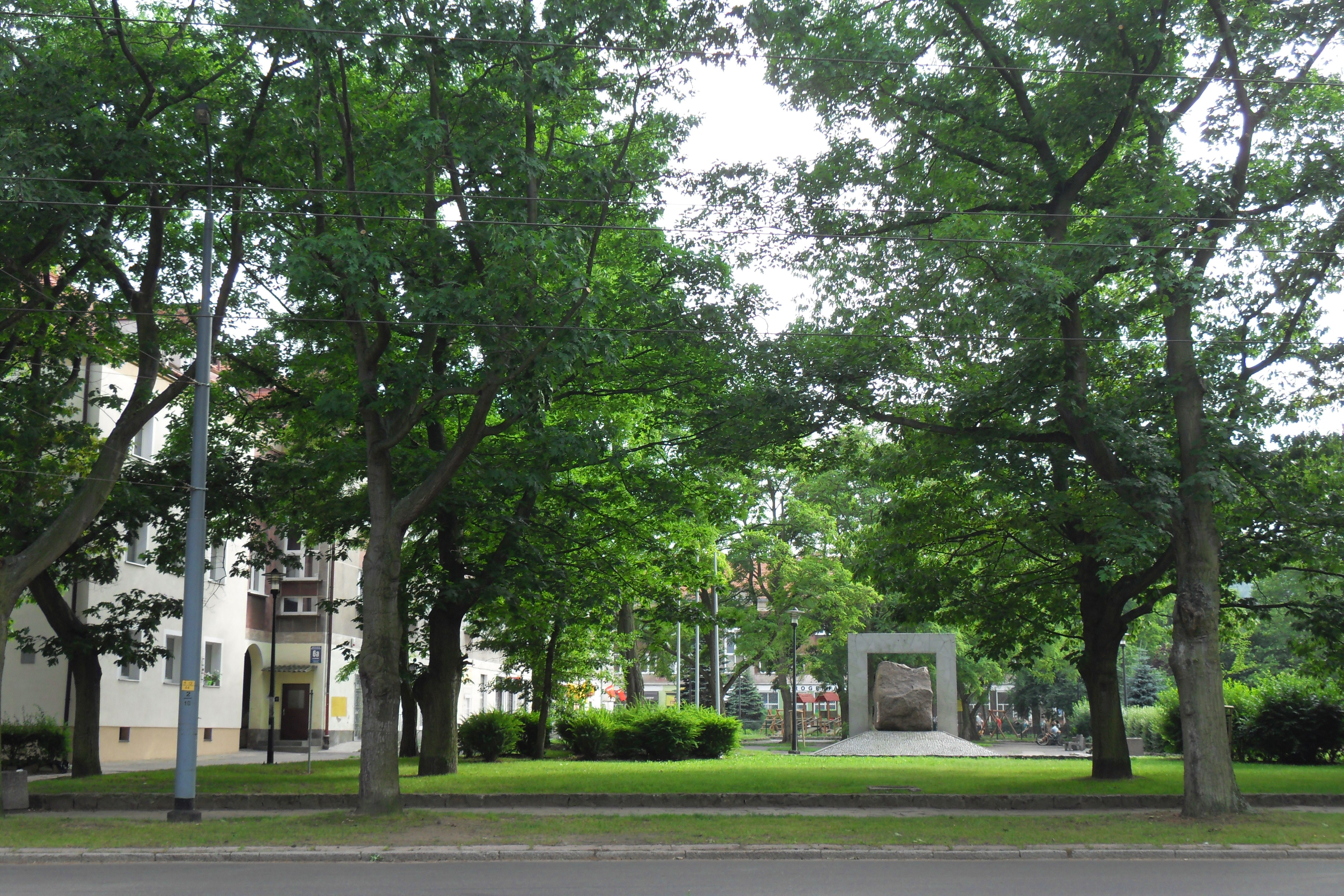
- Plac Stanisława Maczka (Stanisław Maczek Square)

- Location of Strzyża within Gdańsk
- Country: Poland
- Voivodeship: Pomeranian
- County/City: Gdańsk

Area
  - Total: 1.11 km^{2} (0.43 sq mi)

Population (2019)
  - Total: 5,446
  - Density: 4,910/km^{2} (12,700/sq mi)
- Time zone: UTC+1 (CET)
  - Summer (DST): UTC+2 (CEST)

Strzyża (German: Strieß; Kashubian: Strzëżô) is an administrative district of the city of Gdańsk, Poland. It consists primarily of single-family homes.

== Location ==
Strzyża borders Oliwa to the north, Zaspa-Młyniec to the east, Wrzeszcz Górny to the south and east, and VII Dwór to the west.

== History ==
Strzyża originated as a small town on the shores of the stream Strzyża. A bridge over the stream where Strzyża the district is found was first recorded in 1342, when the village itself was first mentioned as well. For much of its history, it was divided into two villages: Strzyża Górna and Strzyża Dolna. Both of them were owned by the Oliwa Abbey. Light industry developed along the stream. Several manor houses were built in the villages, and in 1814, Strzyża Dolna became part of the city of Danzig as a part of Wrzeszcz (then known as Langfuhr).

Strzyża Górna became part of the city somedeal in 1898, and then fully in 1902. During the latter half of the 19th century, Strzyża expanded as more people moved in, mostly workers from Danzig proper. As of 1902, 2,565 people lived there. Much of the area's history then on was closely interlinked with that of Wrzeszcz. Minor development occurred in the district into the 1950s. In 1992, Strzyża was separated as a district from Wrzeszcz, though its borders differed significantly from the actual historical borders of the village of Strzyża.

== Gallery ==
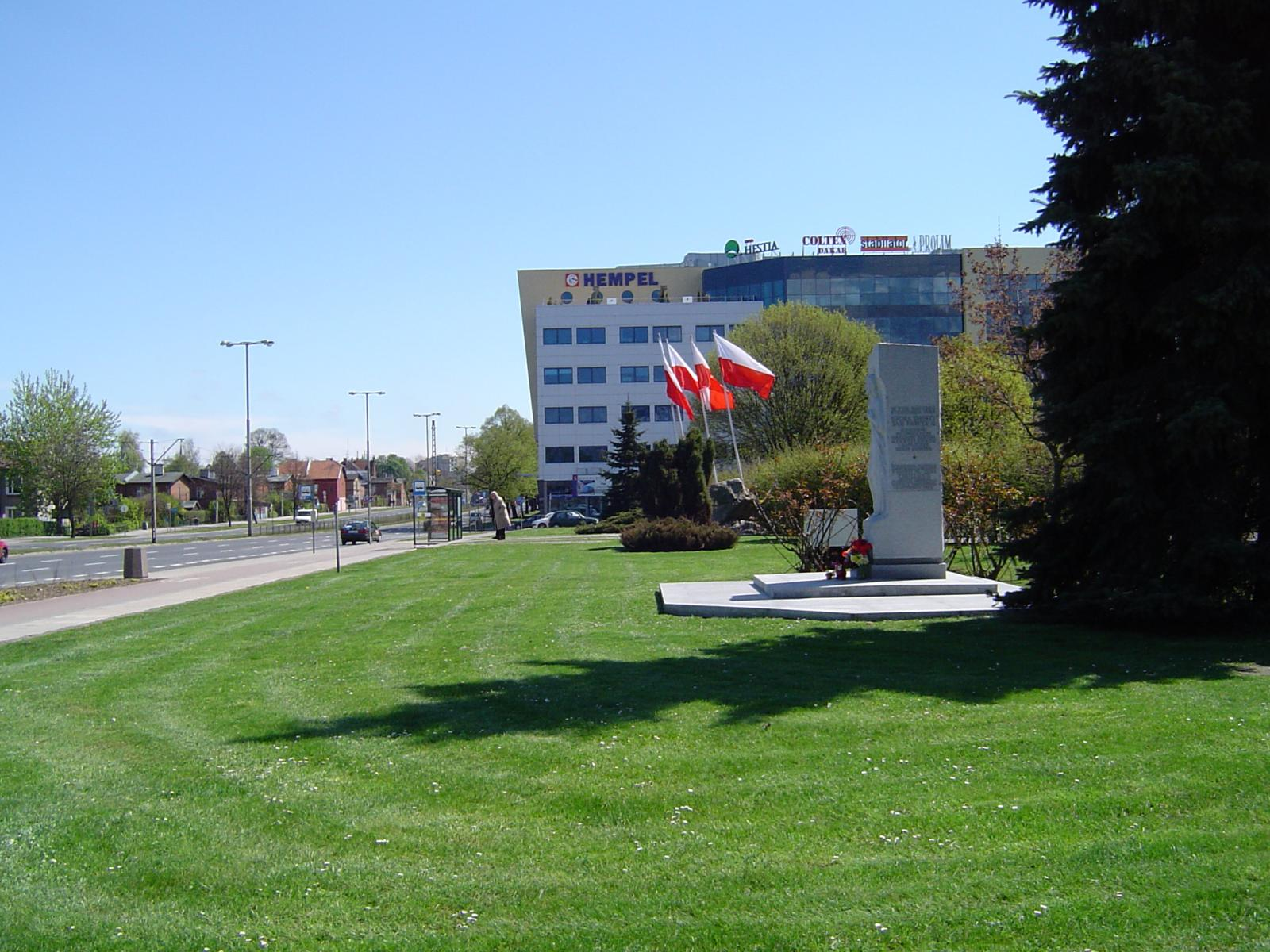
Plac Piłsudskiego ("Piłsudski Square")

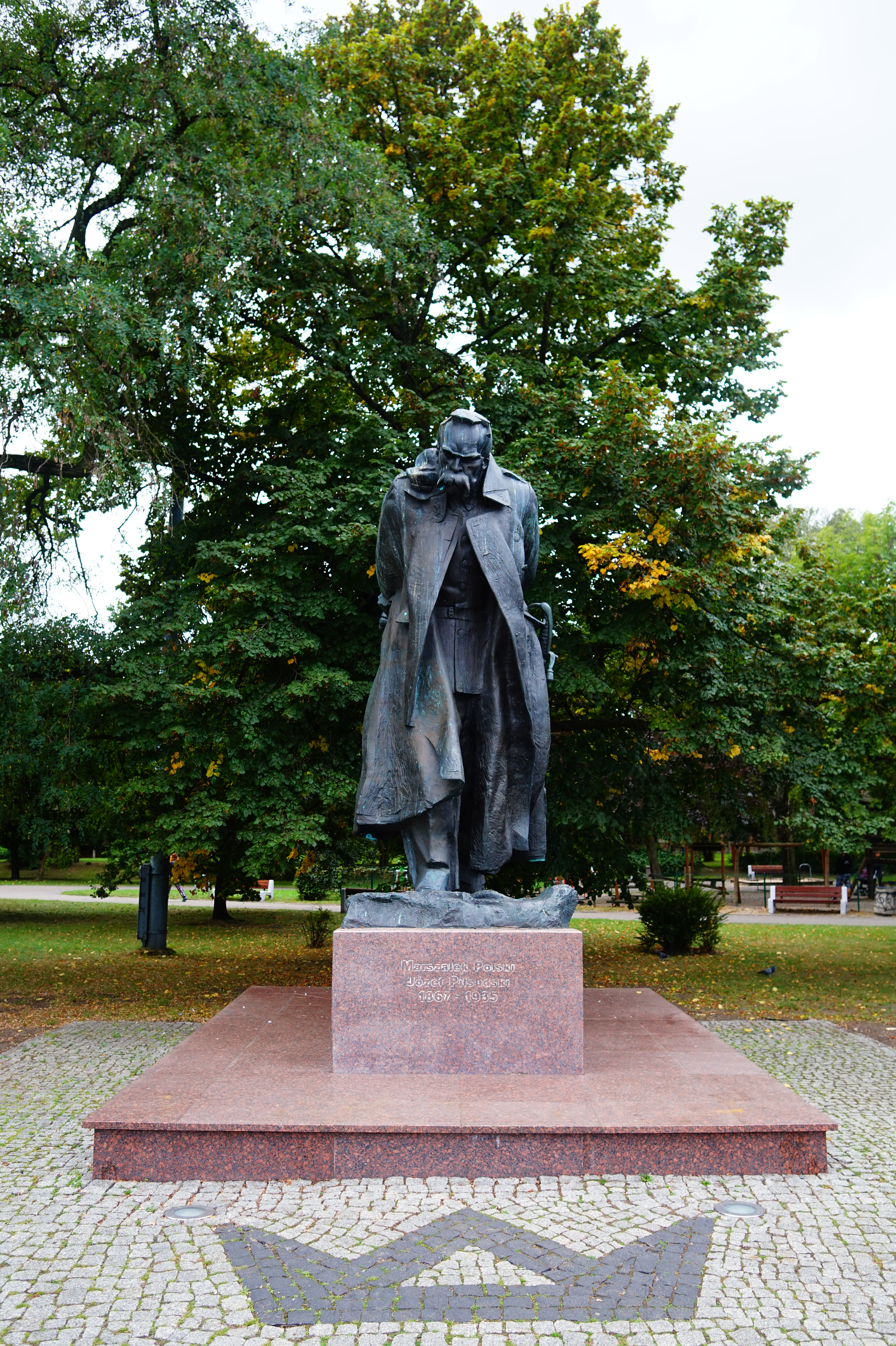
Monument to Józef Piłsudski

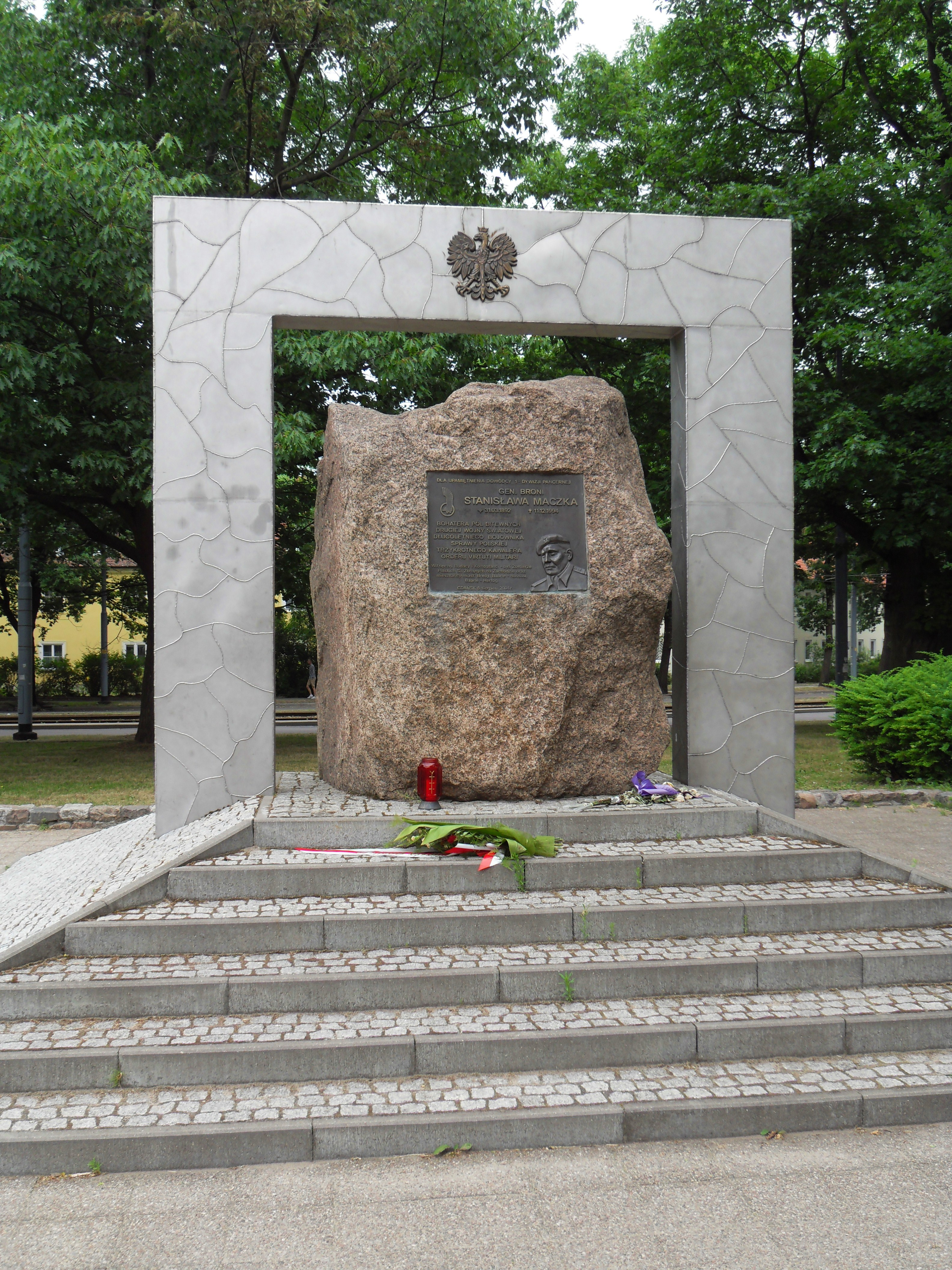
Monument to Stanisław Maczek

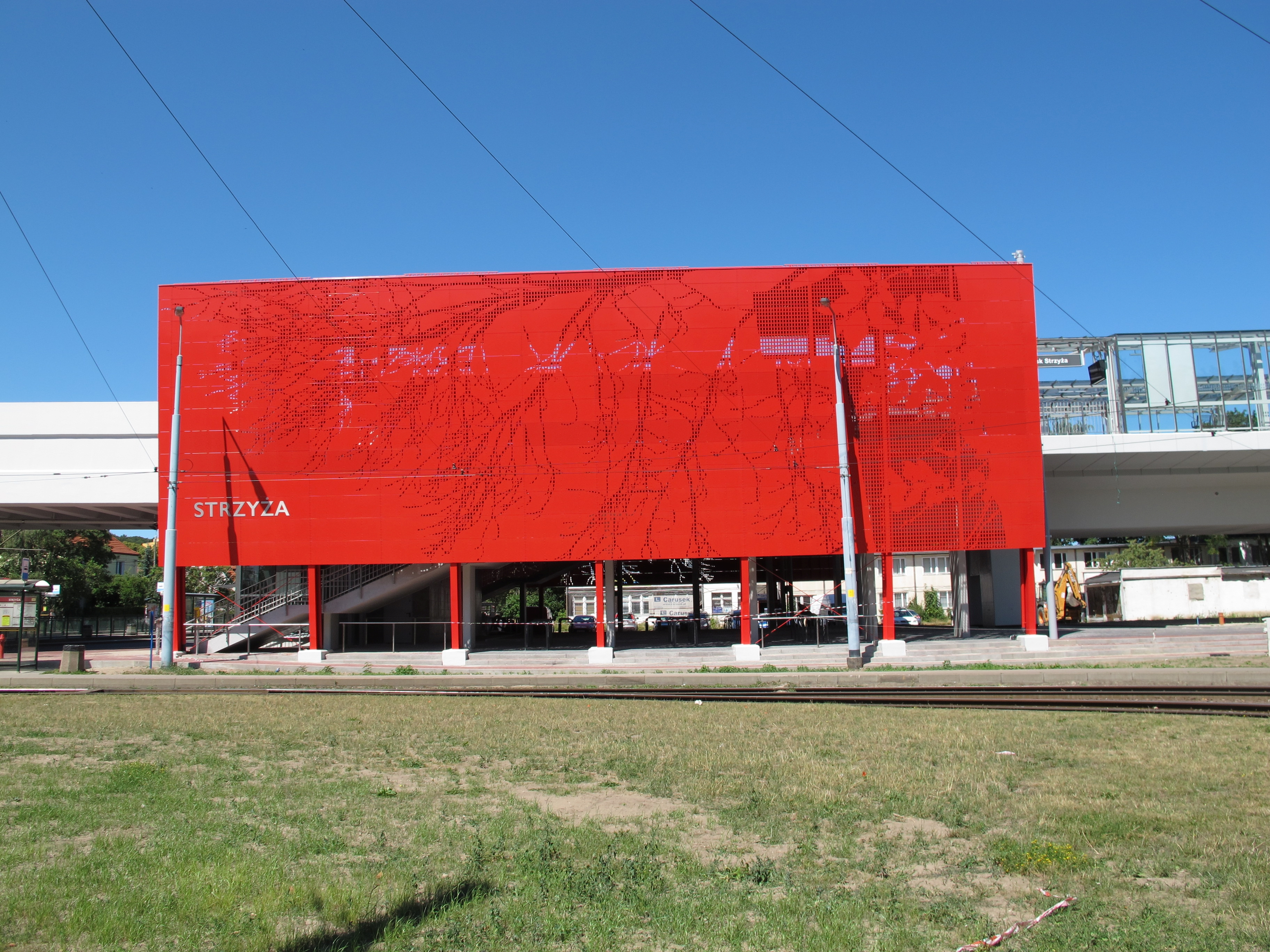
Gdańsk Strzyża railway station
