= Piecki-Migowo =

- District (dzielnica)
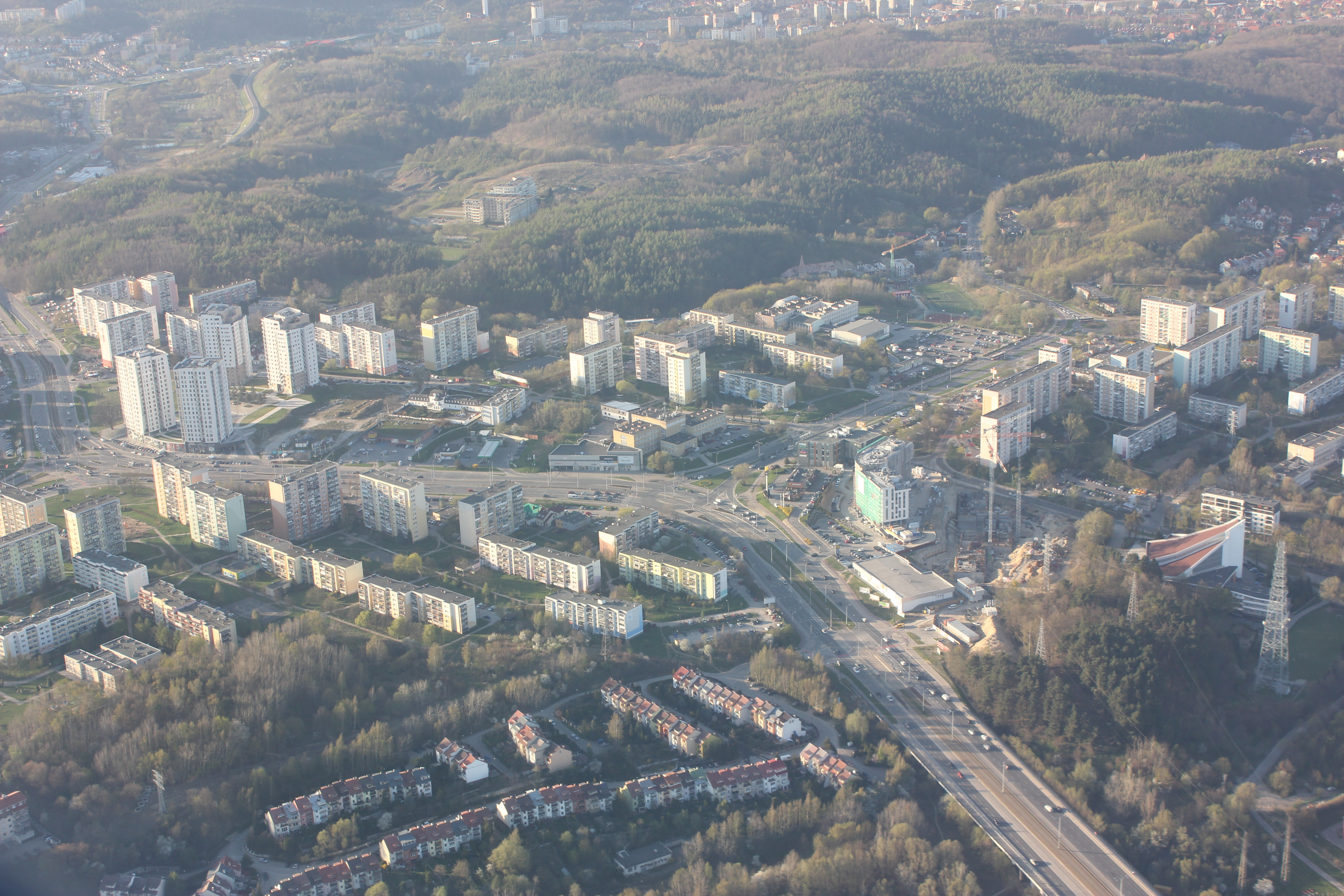
- Aerial view, 2018

- Location of Piecki-Migowo within Gdańsk
- Coordinates: 54.3667°N 18.6333°E
- Country: Poland
- Voivodeship: Pomeranian
- County/City: Gdańsk

Area
  - Total: 4.25 km^{2} (1.64 sq mi)

Population
  - Total: 27,173
  - Density: 6,390/km^{2} (16,600/sq mi)
- Time zone: UTC+1 (CET)
  - Summer (DST): UTC+2 (CEST)
- Postal code(s): 80-288, 80-287
- Vehicle registration: GD

Piecki-Migowo (Kashubian: Piécczi-Mëgòwò), popularly called Morena (the Moraine), is a district of the city of Gdańsk, Poland. It is a growing suburban area and comprises two former villages: Piecki and Migowo.

== Location ==
Piecki-Migowo borders Brętowo and Wrzeszcz Górny to the north, Suchanino and Siedlce to the east, Ujeścisko-Łostowice to the south, and Jasień to the west. It is divided into two quarters (osiedla), Piecki and Migowo.

== History ==
=== Piecki ===
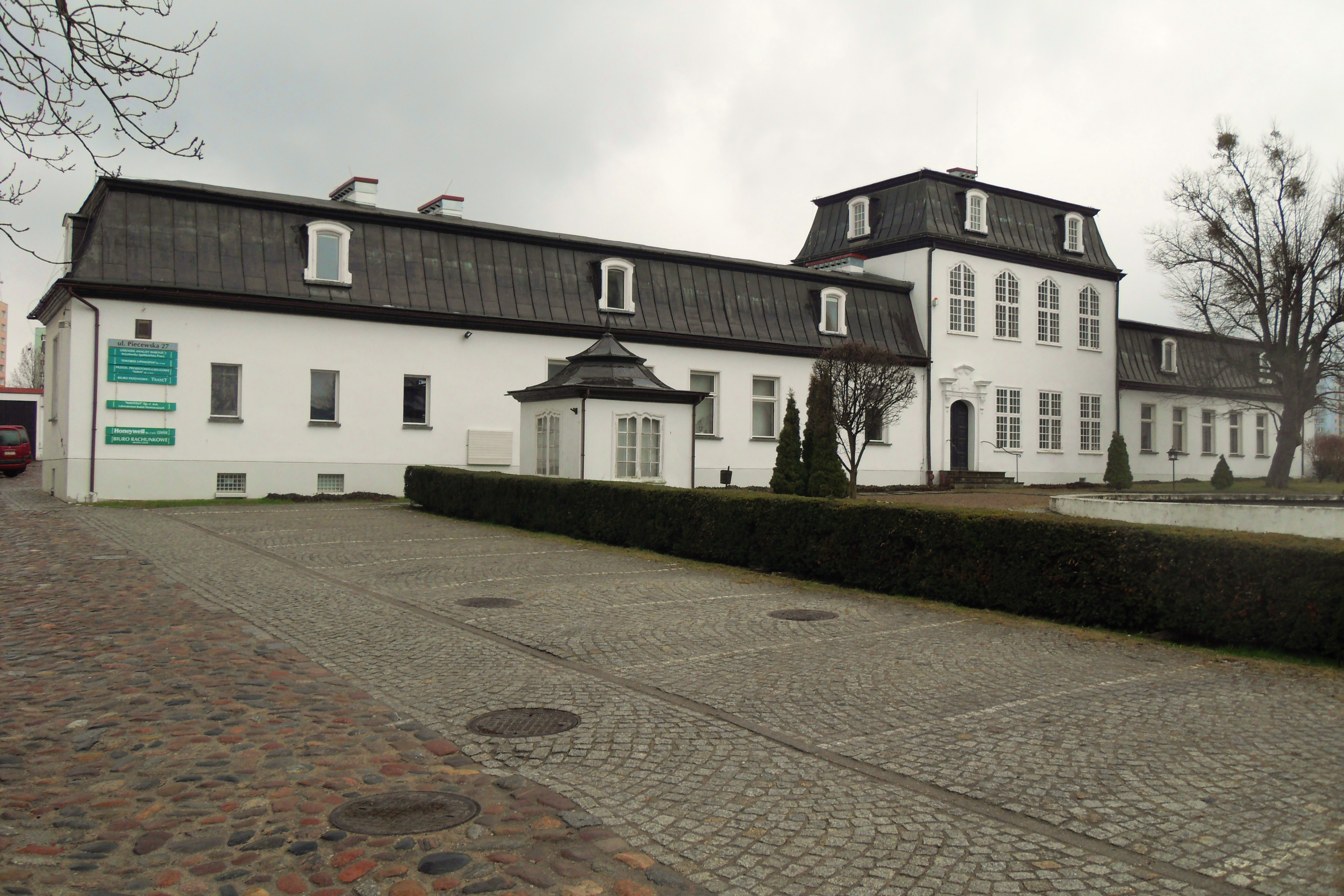
The Uphagen Manor

The village of Piecki is first mentioned as Pietzkendorf in a 1439 document wherein the Teutonic State granted the village to two knights, by which time it already had 36 gardens. It was owned by the Hospital of the Holy Ghost from 1546 onwards. It was destroyed during the Siege of Danzig in 1577 and returned to individual ownership once again in 1589.

In 1698, Johann Uphagen, the owner of the Hospitals of the Holy Ghost and of St. Elizabeth, rented out Piecki. The Uphagen family continued controlling the village, building the Uphagen Manor in the area, which stands to this day. As of 1793, three peasant households and two taverns existed in Piecki. By 1820, there were 10 households and 87 people, and the number of inhabitants had increased to 276 by 1864.

In 1945, after the land was reincorporated into Poland, Pietzkendorf was renamed to Piecewo, but then Piecki in 1948. Piecki became a part of the city of Gdańsk in 1954, forming the district of Piecki-Migowo with the nearby village of Migowo.

=== Migowo ===
Migowo is first mentioned in 1379 as Emugow, when organized settlement in the area began. In 1454, it became property of the city of Gdańsk, which rented it out to various private owners. In 1707, the village was burnt down by Russian troops. As of 1772, seven peasant families lived in the village. In 1868, 156 people lived in the village. The land in Müggau, as it was known at the time, was distributed to various owners in 1919.

Müggau was incorporated into the city of Danzig in 1942, but this change was not recognized by the new Polish city government in 1945. In 1954, after 9 years, it was merged, along with Piecki, into the city.

=== As one district ===
In 1972, the Association of Polish Architects announced a competition for proposals to develop the barren and hilly area (the new developments would be found at some of the highest altitudes in Gdańsk, being upwards of 115 metres (377 ft) above sea level). Starting in 1975, Piecki-Migowo was built up, quickly growing in population. The new estate was named "Moraine" (Morena), from which the district's current colloquial name is derived.
