= Aniołki =

- District (dzielnica)
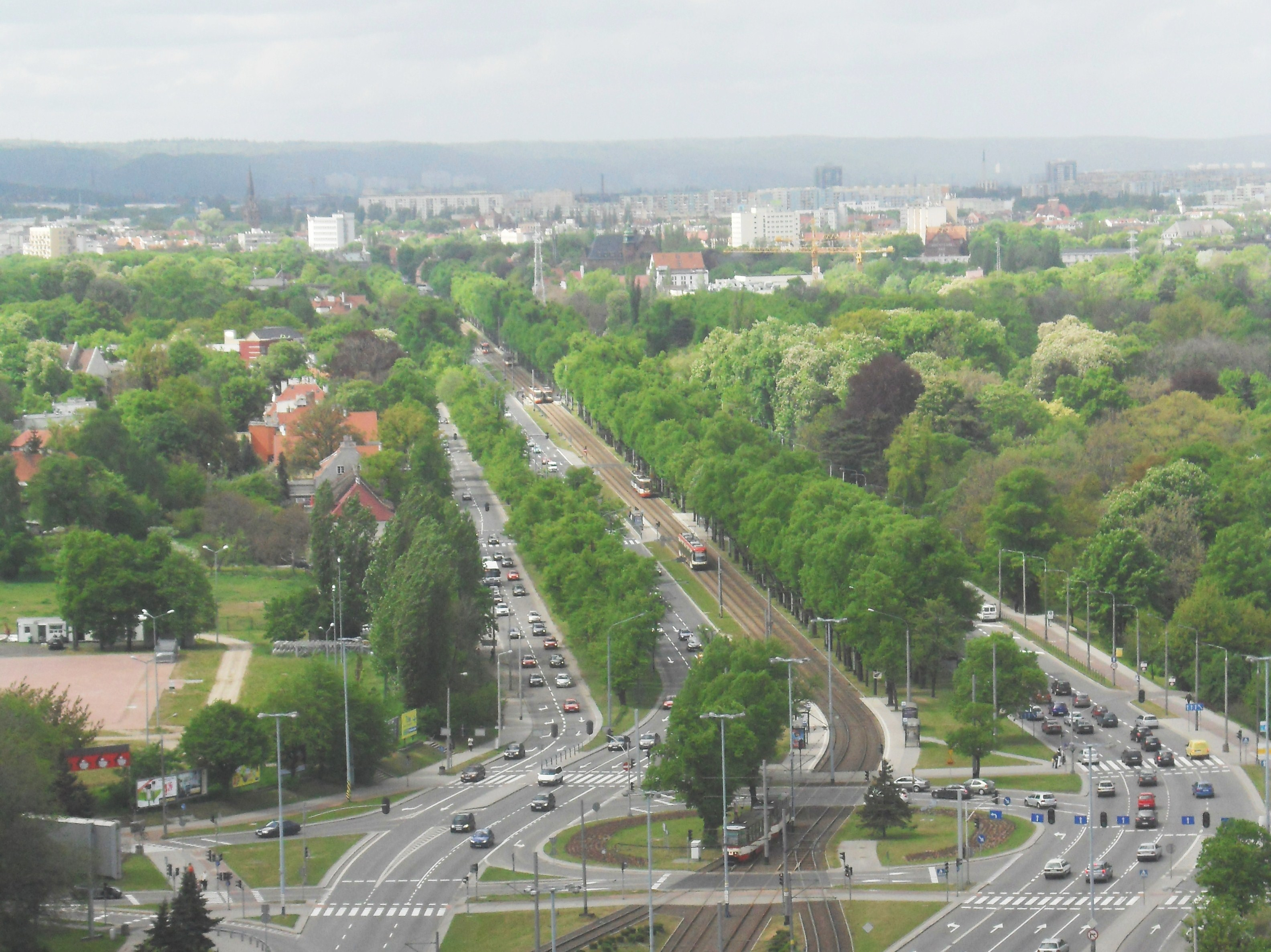
- View on Aniołki from Victory Alley

- Location of Aniołki within Gdańsk
- Coordinates: 54.36169°N 18.63173°E
- Country: Poland
- Voivodeship: Pomeranian
- City: Gdańsk

Government
  - Governor: Monika Mazurowska

Area
  - Total: 2.31 km^{2} (0.89 sq mi)

Population (2020)
  - Total: 4,418
  - Density: 1,914/km^{2} (4,960/sq mi)

Aniołki (Polish pronunciation: [aˈɲɔwkʲi], Kashubian: Janiółczi; lit. 'Angels') is one of the districts of Gdańsk in Poland.

== Location ==
Aniołki is located near the city's centre. It borders Wrzeszcz Górny and Wrzeszcz Dolny to the north, Młyniska to the east, Śródmieście and Siedlce to the south, and Suchanino to the west. It is not divided into any quarters (osiedla).

== History ==
The area in and around Aniołki has gone by several names in the past, including Admiral and Viceadmiral. It was originally part of Suchanino (Zigankenberg in German). Aniołki was also host to a variety of villas, belonging to several notables, which were built starting in the 19th century. Also in that century, several cemeteries were built there, which are notable in their size and amount and have remained a defining feature of Aniołki to this day. A hospital was built as well, today known as the Gdańsk Medical University.

Until Gdańsk Główny railway station was built in the city in 1900, the city of Danzig's main railway station was Olivaer Tor railway station, found in the district's current boundaries. In 1902, it became part of the city of Danzig alongside Zigankenberg, becoming part of the district of Langfuhr. More modern developments have also expanded the area's population; a sizeable part of the southern areas of Aniołki consists of apartment blocks.

The name of the district of Aniołki comes from that of the Church of St. Michael and All of Heaven's Angels, which was present in the area until 1946 and replaced by a T-34 tank. It was given this name in 1992, when it was separated from Suchanino to form a separate district.

== Gallery ==
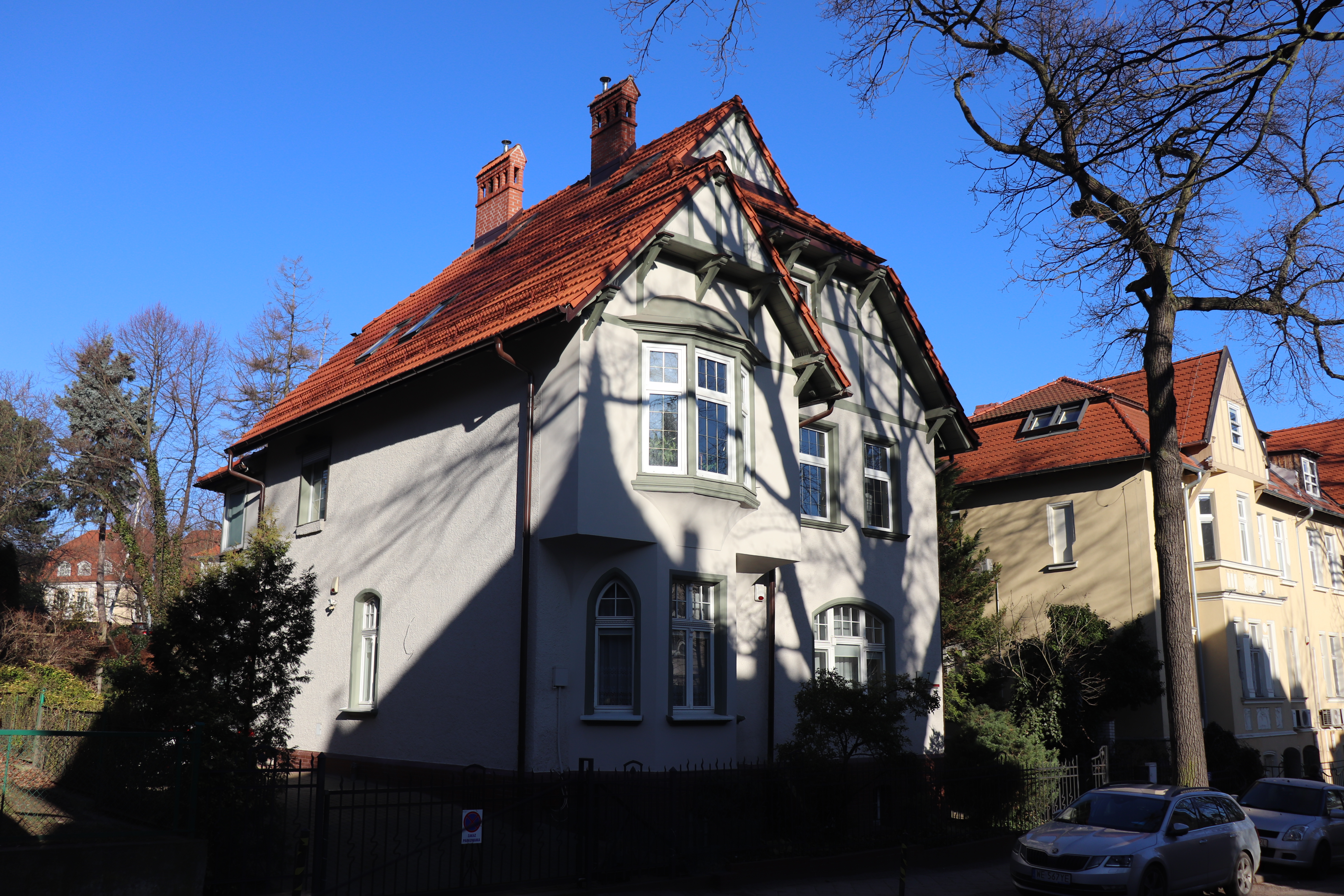
Hoene-Wronskiego 7, one of many local villas

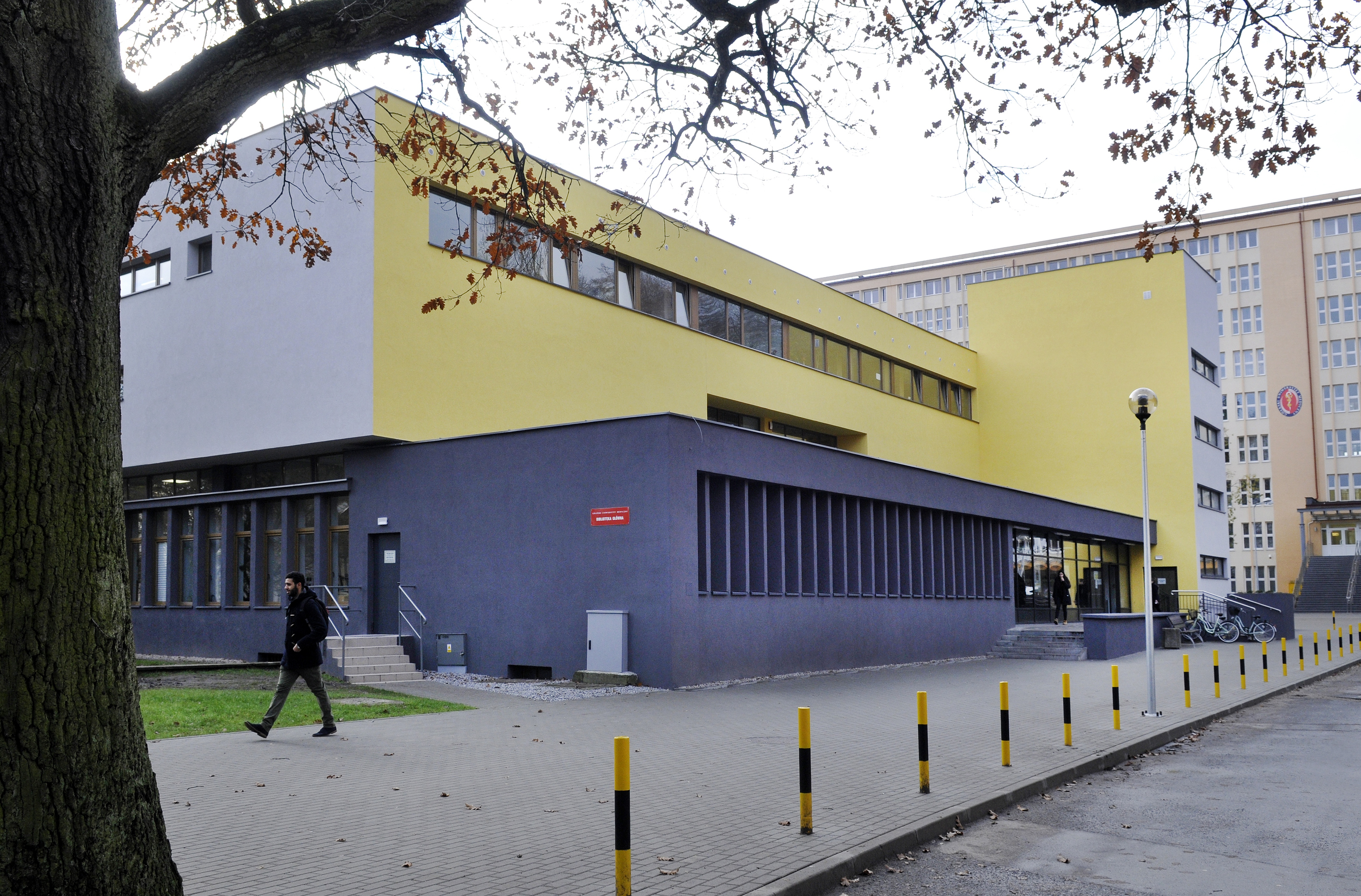
The central library of the Medical University

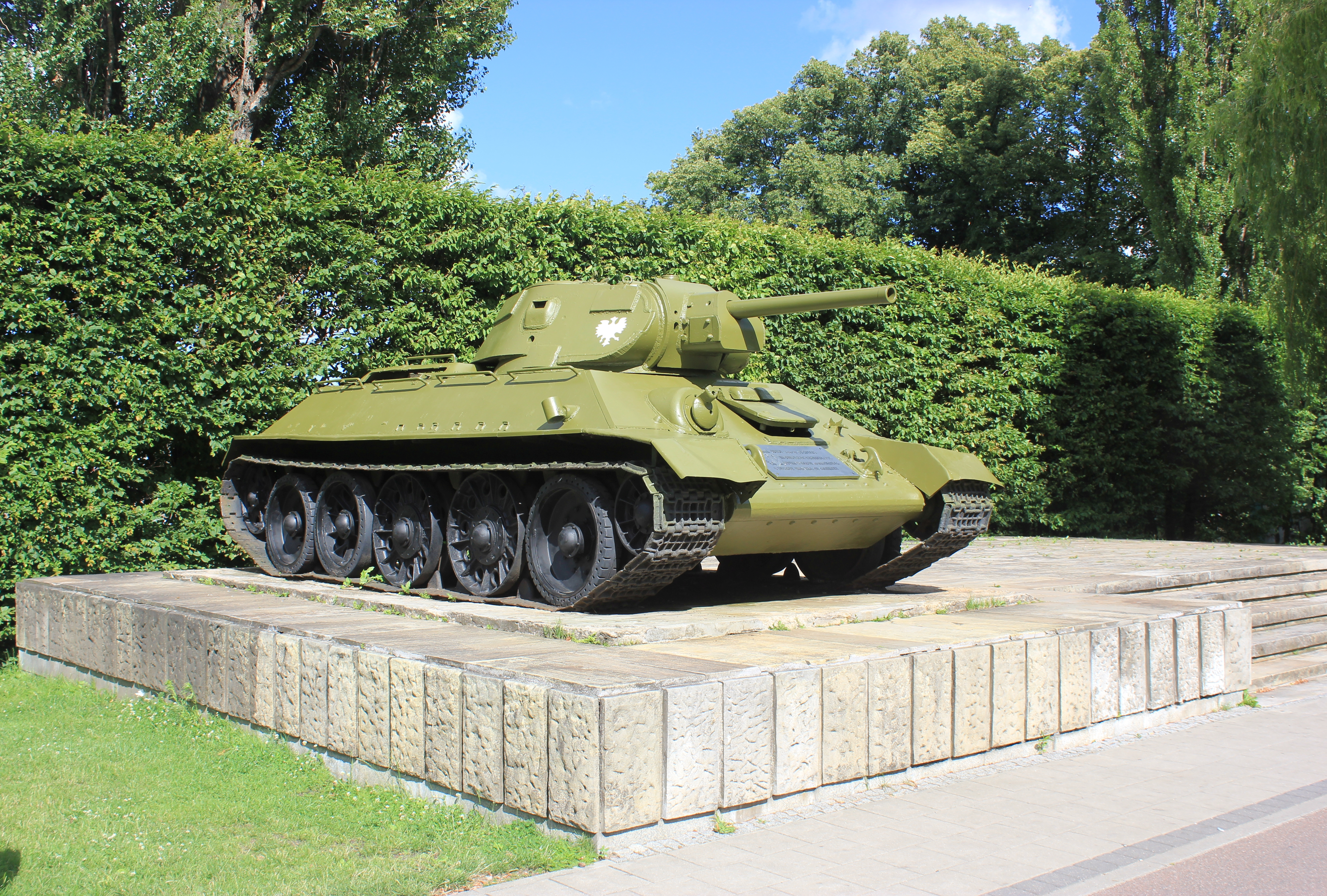
The T-34 tank at the former site of the St. Michael and all of Heaven's Angels church

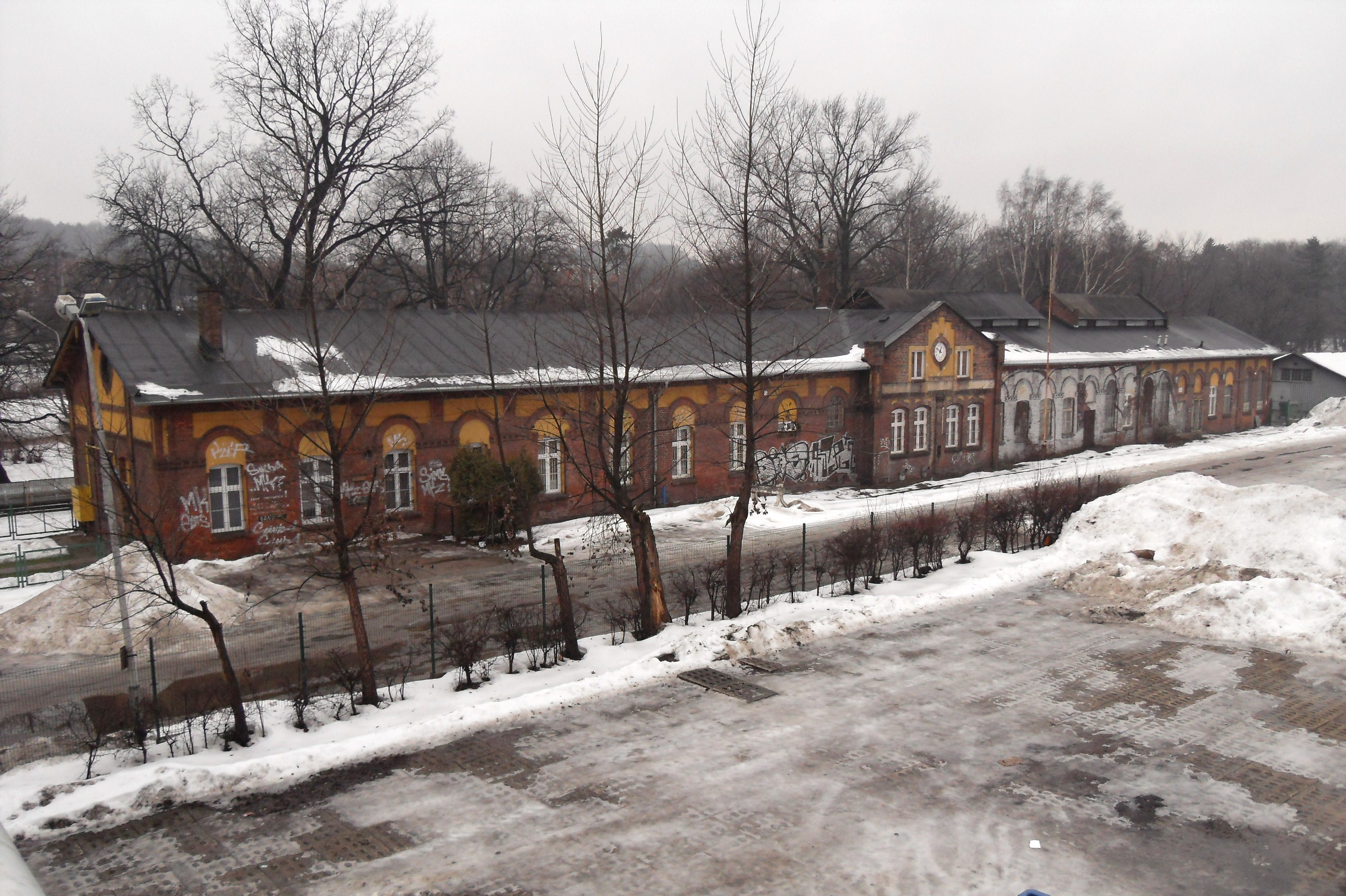
The former railway station of Olivaer Tor
