= Brętowo =

- District (dzielnica)
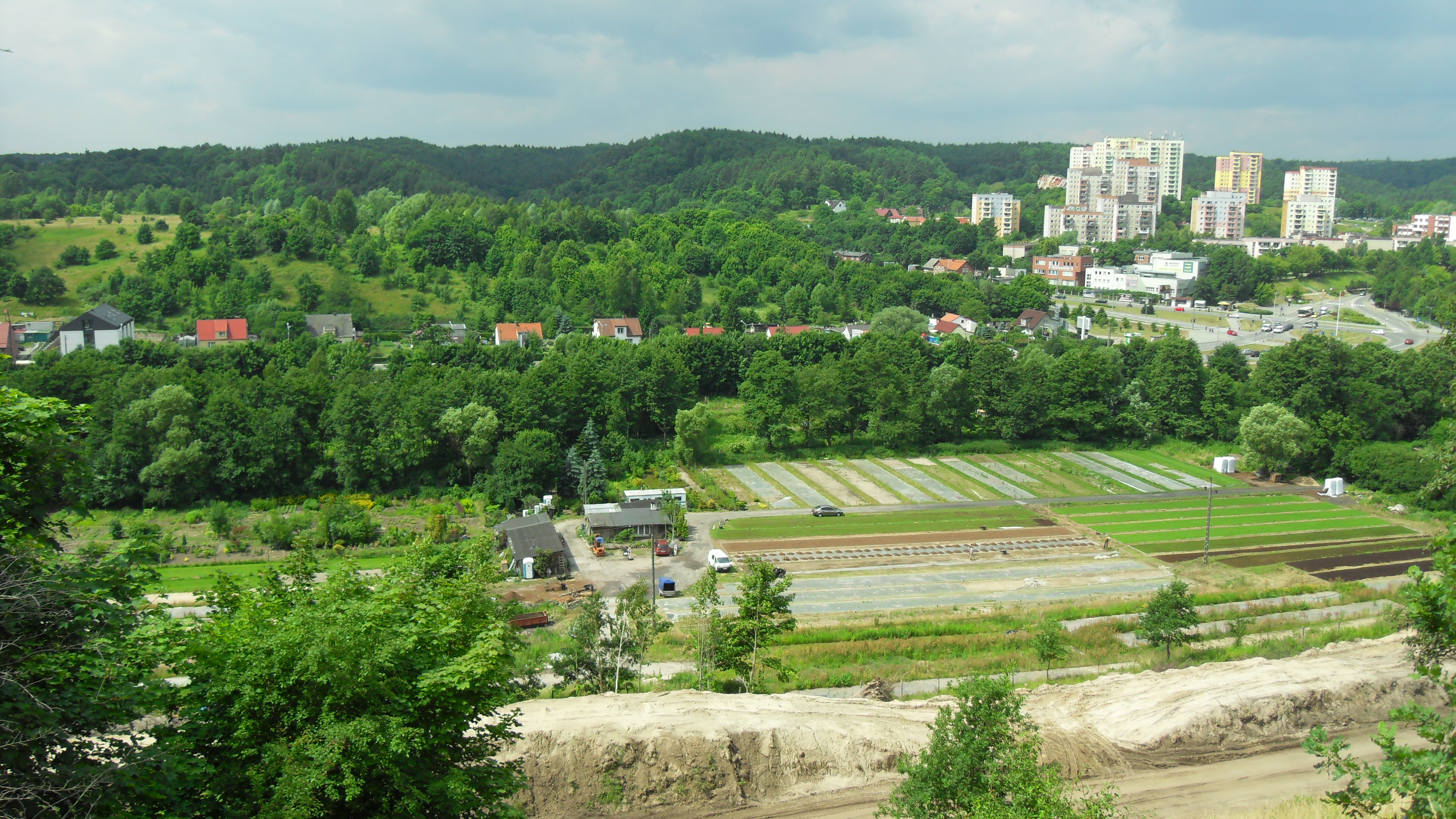
- View of Brętowo with Niedźwiednik on the right

- Location of Brętowo within Gdańsk
- Coordinates: 54°22′N 18°34′E
- Country: Poland
- Voivodeship: Pomeranian
- County/City: Gdańsk
- First mentioned: 1570
- Within city limits: 1933

Area
  - Total: 7.23 km^{2} (2.79 sq mi)

Population (2020)
  - Total: 7,551
  - Density: 1,040/km^{2} (2,700/sq mi)
- Time zone: UTC+1 (CET)
  - Summer (DST): UTC+2 (CEST)
- Vehicle registration: GD

Brętowo (German: Brentau; Kashubian: Brãtowò) is one of the districts of the city of Gdańsk, Poland. It is a largely residential suburban area, located mostly within the Oliwa forests.

== Location ==
Brętowo borders Oliwa and VII Dwór to the north, Wrzeszcz Górny to the east, Piecki-Migowo and Jasień to the south, and Matarnia to the west. It comprises the quarters (osiedla) of Niedźwiednik, Matemblewo, and Nowiec.

== History ==
Brętowo is first mentioned in 1570 as Brigenthute, a small village on land owned by the Oliwa Abbey since 1283. It was a small settlement, with a mill at its centre. Starting in 1586, it was bought and rented by various nobles, being damaged during the Siege of Danzig in 1734. The rebuilding project that followed significantly expanded the village, notably constructing several forges there.

In 1786, the Oliwa Abbey's lands in Brentau, as it was then known, were confiscated and split between various owners. As of 1885, the village was inhabited by 216 people. As of 1910, with the expansion of the city of Danzig, Brentau was inhabited by 1,178 people. The last of the forges remained operational until the 1920s and 1930s. In 1914, the railway from Wrzeszcz to Stara Piła (today in Kokoszki) started running trains through Brentau, where a station was opened. It was destroyed in World War II and subsequently closed, but reopened in 2015 as Gdańsk Brętowo railway station.

In 1933, Brentau was incorporated into Danzig's city boundaries, and it continued its steady growth and expansion. In c. 1935, 1,845 people inhabited Brentau. After World War II, the area became part of Poland and Brentau was officially renamed to Brętowo in 1946. It lost its industrial character and instead became residential, with the Niedźwiednik area being filled by apartment block housing. Brętowo has remained largely residential to this day.
