= Suchanino =

- District (dzielnica)
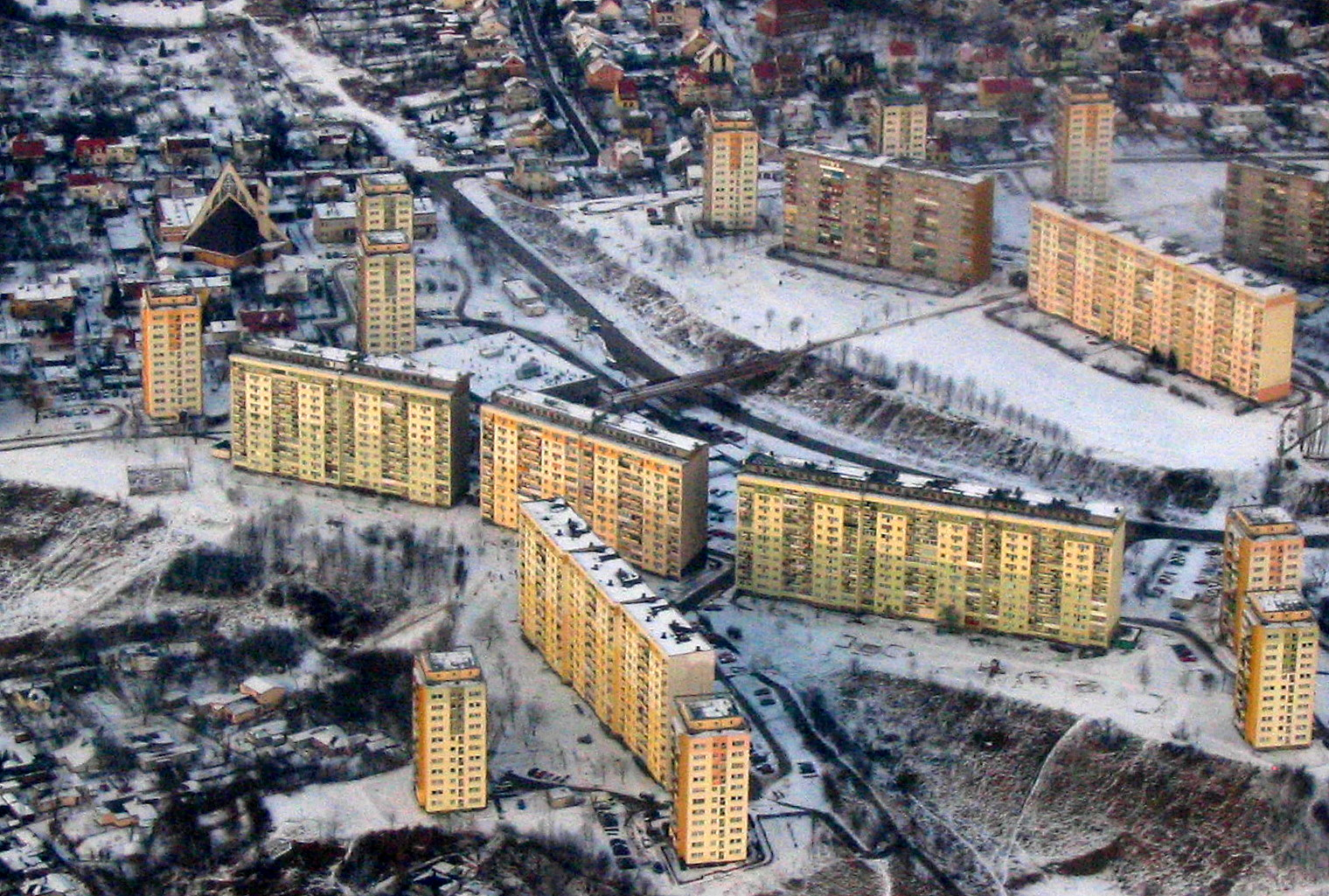
- Aerial view of Suchanino in January 2005

- Location of Suchanino within Gdańsk
- Coordinates: 54°22′N 18°39′E
- Country: Poland
- Voivodeship: Pomeranian
- County/City: Gdańsk
- Within city limits: 1902

Area
  - Total: 1.44 km^{2} (0.56 sq mi)

Population (2019)
  - Total: 10,323
  - Density: 7,170/km^{2} (18,600/sq mi)
- Time zone: UTC+1 (CET)
  - Summer (DST): UTC+2 (CEST)
- Vehicle registration: GD

Suchanino (Kashubian: Cëgónczi, German: Zigankenberg) is a district of Gdańsk, Poland, located near the central parts of the city. Most buildings in Suchanino are high-rise and were constructed in the 1970s.

== Location ==
Suchanino borders Wrzeszcz Górny and Aniołki to the north, Siedlce to the east, south, and west, and Piecki-Migowo to the north and west. It does not contain any separate quarters (osiedla).

== History ==
Suchanino was, like most of Gdańsk's districts, initially a village. It was initially owned by individual knights. It was first mentioned in 1382 as Suchanke, though its more common German name became Zigankenberg, which was commonly translated as Cygańska Góra. In 1380, the Teutonic State handed Zigankenberg over to the Młode Miasto, a quarter of the city of Gdańsk proper. When Młode Miasto was destroyed in 1454, the area was handed over to the city of Gdańsk.

The area's soils were poor, and it was sparsely populated. It was destroyed and robbed repeatedly, with the known instances of such acts occurring in 1461, 1586, 1656, 1734, 1807, and 1813. Industry in Zigankenberg was also sparse; the only industrially significant buildings were two brickyards. In 1902, Zigankenberg was incorporated into Gdańsk's city borders and became part of the district of Langfuhr (today Wrzeszcz). As of 1902, about 5,800 people lived in Zigankenberg.

Zigankenberg grew largely as a residential area. Its history was closely tied to that of the larger nearby Langfuhr. Various housing projects increased its population over the coming years. A subcamp of the Stutthof concentration camp operated in the district during World War II, where the prisoners were subjected to brickyard work.

In 1945, after Poland regained the lands in and around Danzig—now Gdańsk—the area was renamed to Suchanino, although it had been more commonly known in Polish as Cygańska Góra. From 1974 to 1978, a large apartment block neighbourhood was built in Suchanino, consisting of 40 buildings and 2764 apartments. In 1992, Aniołki separated from Suchanino, becoming an independent district.
