= Oliwa forests =

Forest in Poland

Oliwa Forests Polish: Lasy Oliwskie
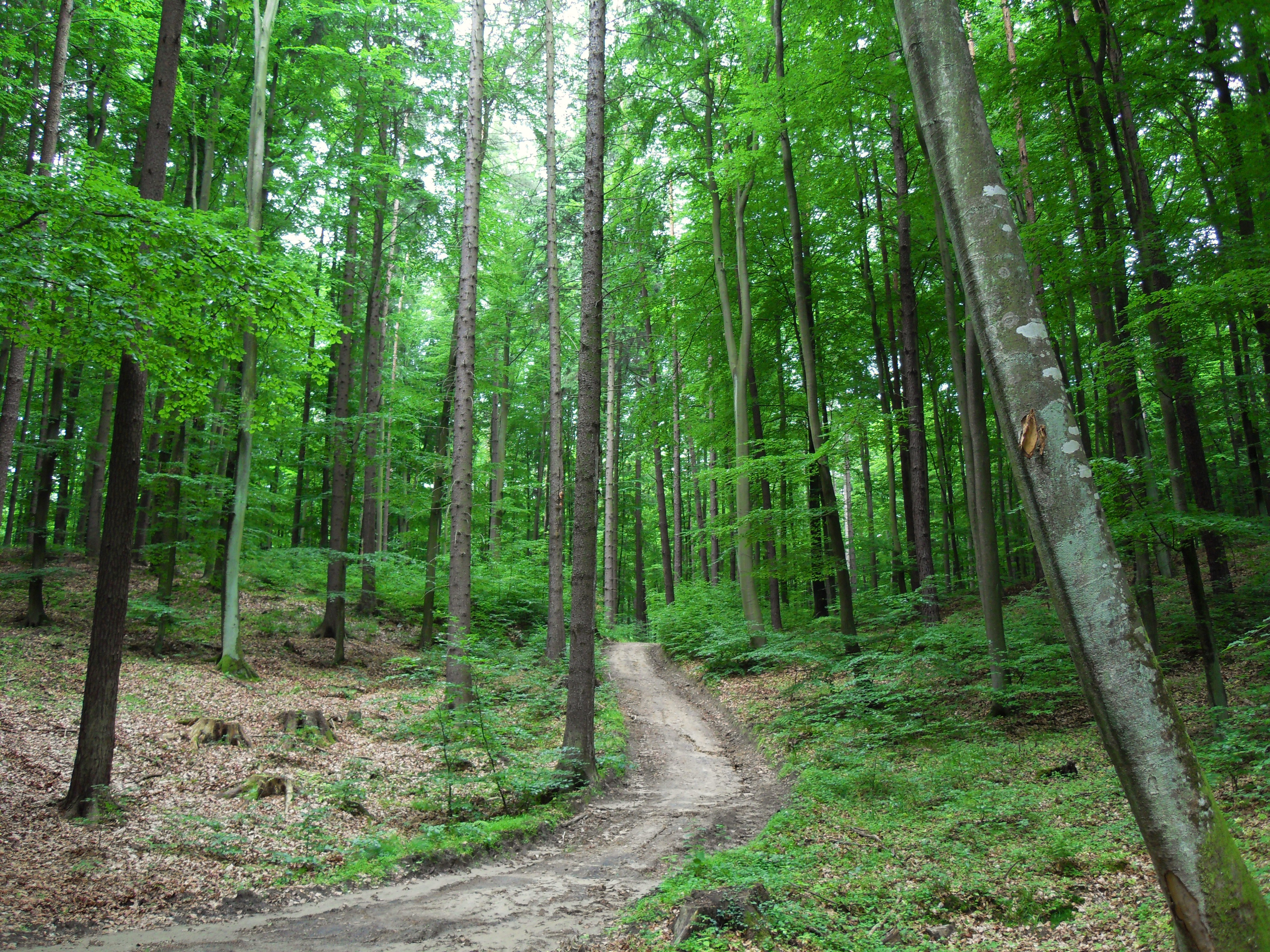
- Oliwa Forest in Brętowo

Geography
- Location: Pomeranian Voivodeship, Poland

Ecology
- Dominant tree species: beech

Oliwa forests (Polish: Lasy Oliwskie; Kashubian: Òlëwsczé Lasë) is a forest located in the southern part of the Tricity Landscape Park in Gdańsk in northern Poland. The total area is 60 km^{2}.

The forests belonged to the Cistercian monastery in Oliwa since the establishment of the monastery in 1188. Just after the First Partition of Poland, on November 1, 1772, the King of Prussia took over the forests. Today, the forest is managed by Nadleśnictwo Gdańsk (Gdańsk forestry), part of the Regional Directorate of State Forests in Gdańsk.
