= Michał Markuszewski =

Polish scientist

- Born: Michał Jan Markuszewski; 1972 (age 53–54)
- Citizenship: Polish
- Education: Medical University of Gdańsk
- Occupation: Pharmacologist
- Employer: Faculty of Pharmacy of the Medical University of Gdańsk

Michał Jan Markuszewski (born 1972) is a Polish pharmacologist, professor of pharmaceutical sciences, professor and rector of the Medical University of Gdańsk for the term 2024–2028.
