= Medical University of Gdańsk =

Medical school in Gdańsk, Poland

Coordinates: 54°21′58″N 18°37′50″E

- Gdański Uniwersytet Medyczny
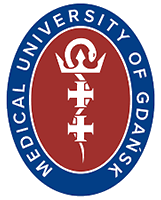
- Faculty of Pharmacy of Gdańsk Medical University.
- Latin: Universitas Medica Gedanensis
- Established: 8 October 1945
- Affiliations: ERASMUS programme
- Chancellor: Prof. Jacek Bigda
- Rector: Prof. dr hab. Michał Markuszewski
- Administrative staff: 1657
- Students: 6,636 (12.2023)
- Doctoral students: 176
- Location: Gdańsk, Pomeranian Voivodeship, Poland
- Campus: Urban
- Website: mug.edu.pl

The Medical University of Gdańsk (formerly Gdańsk Medical Academy) is the largest medical academic institution in northern Poland. It educates more than 5,000 undergraduate and postgraduate students in four faculties.

== History ==
The Akademia Lekarska in Gdańsk was founded on 8 October 1945. Its history is related to the tradition of medical practice of surgeons associated in the Surgeons Guild (active since 1454), as well as teaching and medical and scientific research, particularly in Gdańskie Gimnazjum Akademickie (Atheneum Gedanese), established in 1558. This institution set up the Department of Science and Medicine (physices et medicinae), which was managed and supervised by eminent scholars. Among the most famous lecturers were: Joachim Oelhafius, a native of Gdańsk, who in 1613 was the first to perform a public autopsy of a newborn child in northern Europe, and Dr Jan Adam Kulmus, the author of the anatomical atlas Tabulae anatomicae, published in 1932. The work went into several editions and was translated into many languages. The Gimnazjum Akademickie represented a high standard of achievement and its graduates were accepted in the third year of medical studies at universities. After the closing of the Gimnazjum Akademickie at the beginning of the 19th century, it was not until the first years of the 20th century that another academic school was established.

Pharmaceutical sciences in Gdańsk date back to the times of Johannes Placotomus, author and founder of the first pharmacy in Gdańsk in 1527, and Johannes Schmiedt, alias Fabritius, the co-author of the oldest Polish pharmacopoeia, published in 1665.

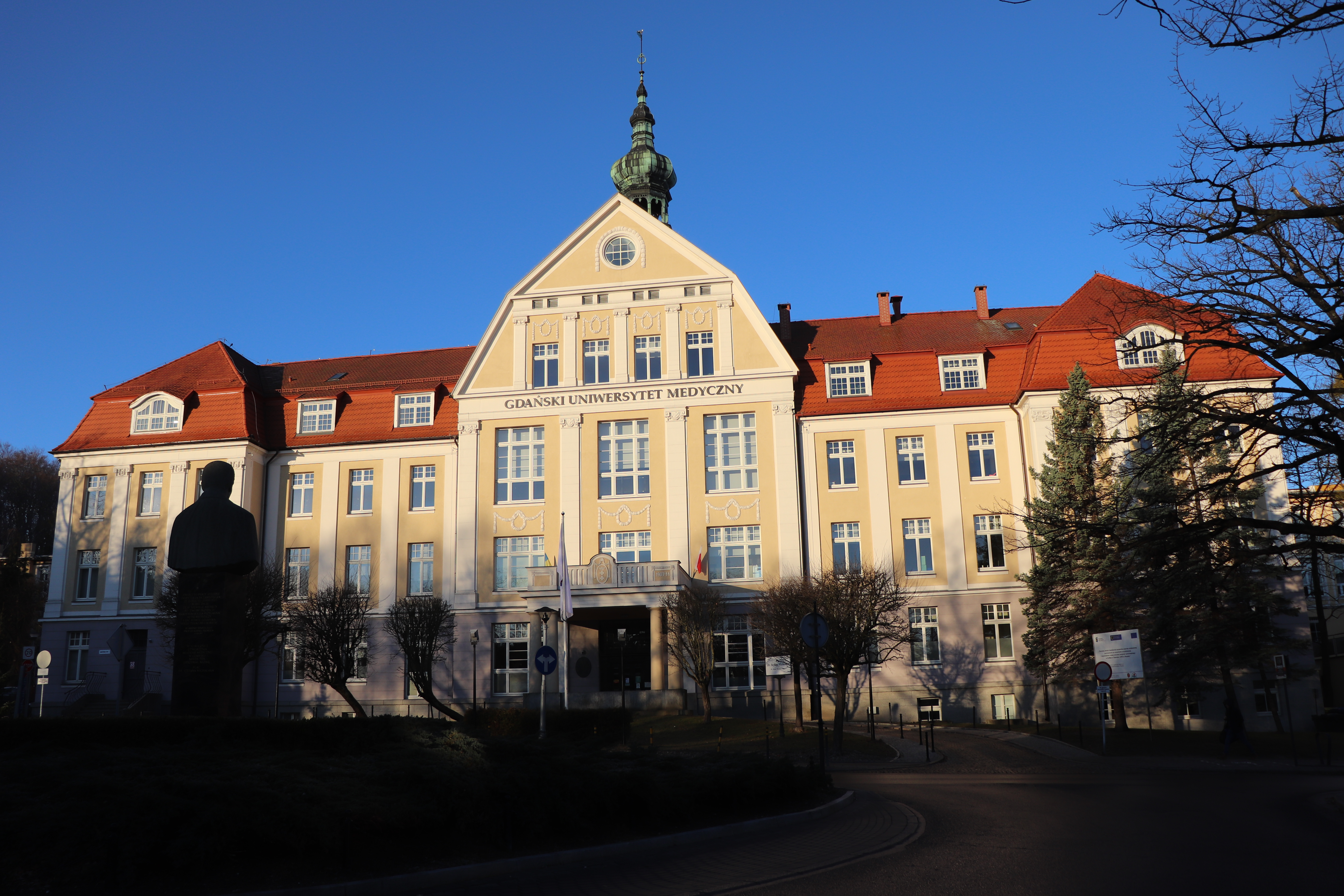
The historic Building 1 of the MUG Hospital, Dębinki Street.

In 1935 the Gdańsk Senate, already represented mostly by German nationalists (members of the NSDAP), went about establishing Akademia Medycyny Praktycznej (Die Staatliche Akademie für Praktische Medizin zu Danzig) on the basis of the municipal hospital built between 1907 and 1911. Teaching medicine in the newly opened college involved clinical courses. In 1940, following the introduction of pre-clinical courses, the college's name was changed to Medizinische Akademie in Danzig, offering full 5-year medical studies.

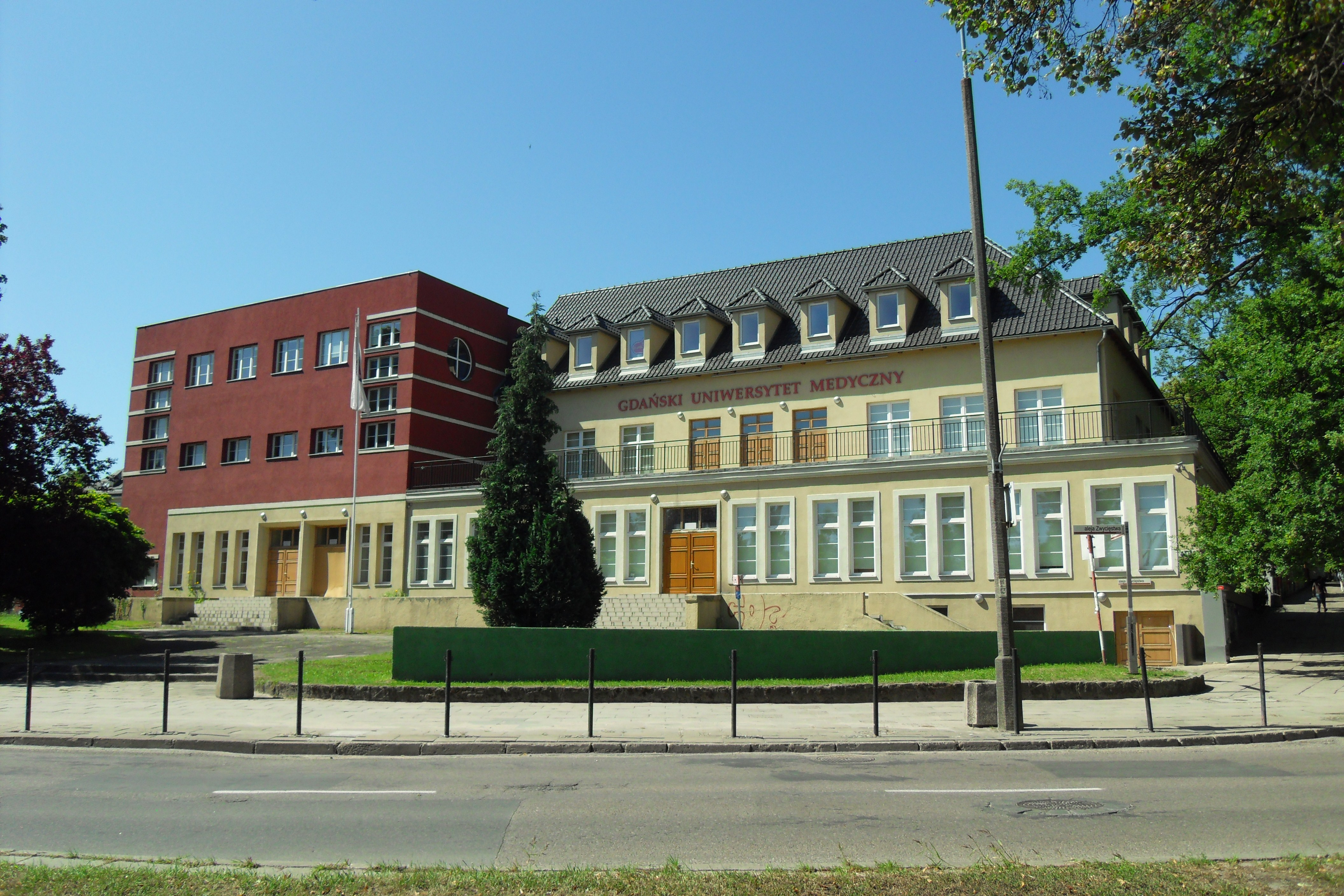
MUG Atheneum Gedanense Novum building

After the end of World War II, Akademia Lekarska was founded in Gdańsk. In 1950 its name was changed to Akademia Medyczna (The Medical University of Gdańsk). Among the professors of the newly established college were many eminent Polish scholars from the University of Stefan Batory in Vilnius, who had come to Gdańsk after Vilnius was incorporated into the Soviet Union, and a handful of scholars from other pre-war Polish academic centers. Initially, Akademia Lekarska conducted studies in two majors: medical and pharmaceutical. In May 1947 the Faculty of Stomatology was created and later on in January 1950 the name was changed to the Subfaculty of Dentistry at the Faculty of Medicine. In 1975 Medical University of Gdańsk (MUG) opened a branch in Bydgoszcz, which in 1984 became an independent college. In 1993, as a joint unit of Medical University of Gdańsk and Gdańsk University, the Intercollegiate Faculty of Biotechnology was founded. In the academic year 2005/2006 Medical University started the Faculty of Health Sciences. In 2016 works began on a Non-Invasive Medicine Centre at the university, with works set to be complete by the end of 2020.

From 30 October 2019 the Medical University of Gdańsk officially holds the ministerial status of a research university. It is 1 of 10 universities in Poland and the only medical university in this group.

In 2020, the university became a member of the Daniel Fahrenheit Association of Gdańsk Universities (Polish: Związek Uczelni w Gdańsku im. Daniela Fahrenheita) which brings together the city's major institutions of higher education including the University of Gdańsk and the Gdańsk University of Technology. The objective of the newly founded organization is to work on projects aimed at further federalization of the universities, to bolster the scientific cooperation between them and to pursue a common promotional and ranking policy.

== Faculties ==
The faculties are:

- Faculty of Medicine
- Faculty of Pharmacy
- Faculty of Health Sciences with Institute of Maritime and Tropical Medicine
- The Intercollegiate Faculty of Biotechnology of the University of Gdańsk and the Medical University of Gdańsk.

Teaching activities are carried out by nearly one thousand of academic teachers, with over one hundred of them holding the professor position. Currently, MUG offers education in nearly all medical professions and classes are also conducted in English. This programme is called English Division of the Faculty of Medicine.

== University rankings ==
MUG is recognized nationally as one of the top universities in Poland and ranked internationally for clinical medicine by some publications.

- National Ranking: In the 2020 edition of the annual University Academic Ranking published by Perspektywy, an independent non-profit educational foundation, that has been publishing rankings of Polish universities yearly since 1998, MUG is ranked 1st as a medical school and 6th as a national university (advancing 1 position from the previous year).
- International Rankings:
  1. U.S. News & World Report: MUG is ranked 290nd for Clinical Medicine in the 2020 edition of the Best Global Universities, moving up from 292nd in 2019.
  2. Shanghai Academic Ranking of World Universities: MUG is ranked 301-400 for Clinical Medicine in the 2020 edition of Global Ranking of Academic Subjects published by ShanghaiRanking.

== Research ==
Aside from the educational activity, the MUG focuses on scientific research. In July 2012, the Faculty of Pharmacy with Subfaculty of Laboratory Medicine was designated one of Poland's 6 Leading National Research Centres (Krajowe Naukowe Ośrodki Wiodące, KNOW) by the Prime Minister's Office, as part of a wider strategy to make the country more competitive and innovative, and was granted a subsidy of 50 million zlotys.

When the ranking system of the Ministry of Science and Higher Education was established, the Medical University of Gdańsk introduced an internal system of parametric assessment of particular research units. Today, three faculties of the MUG – Medicine, Pharmacy, and the Intercollegiate Faculty of Biotechnology have top positions in the ranking, as does the unique Interdepartmental Institute of Maritime and Tropical Medicine. The Faculty of Health Sciences, founded in 2006, is preparing for the parametric assessment of the Ministry of Science and Higher Education and it has also submitted an application to be granted the right to award PhD degrees.

The main funding sources for research are: statutory activity (118 research topics), commissioned projects, development projects, own projects, promoter projects, post doctorate projects (altogether 109 projects), own research (345 research topics), and research support activity (37 projects). Moreover, the academic teachers perform scientific research under contract with external entities, primarily with pharmaceutical enterprises (19 service and research projects). The university staff also carries out projects financed by the EU framework programmes and other community initiatives, as well as structural funds, including the Sector Operational Programme –Increased Enterprise Competition.

== Developments ==
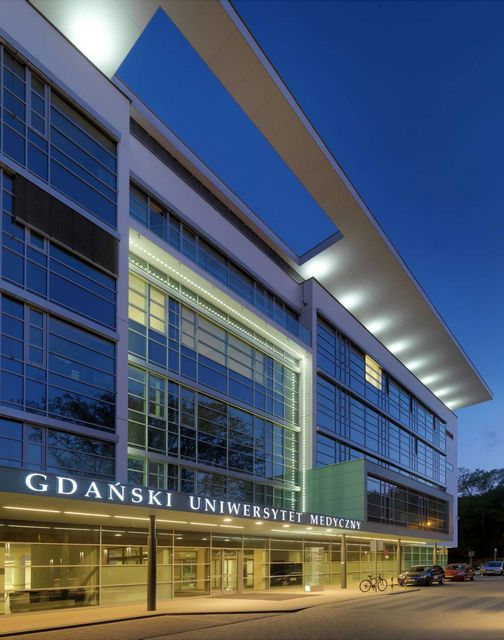
The Invasive Medicine Centre was built in 2011, funded by the Polish government (480 million PLN). It is the largest healthcare investment in the Pomorskie region in the last 30 years. This new hospital building consists of several parts which house 12 surgical wards. The centre's maximum bedspace is 311 patients. Its roof functions as a helicopter landing pad, which is connected with the Emergency Department via two elevators.

Many new research institutes and clinics have been established, the equipment has been modernized, new facilities have been created and all the buildings including the campus have been equipped with computers and a computer network. In 2007 the modernization of the main teaching hospital, Academic Clinical Centre was launched. The investment is co-financed by the state budget with the subsidy of 480 million zlotys.

Construction of the new Non-Invasive Medical Center with about 75,000 m^{2}, at an estimated cost of 600 million Polish zlotys, commenced in 2015 and is scheduled to complete in 2020. When finished, the building will consist of 4 connected buildings that could house up to 687 beds (excluding bed space at day wards and the post-anesthesia unit).

== International links ==
The university cooperates with more than 50 universities and scientific centers abroad. It exchanges students and teachers in the framework of the Lifelong Learning Programme and is an active member of many European organizations and institutions. It is a founding member of two regional organizations: ScanBalt and the Baltic Sea Region University Network.

== Clinical mission ==
Aside from fulfilling its teaching and research roles, the Medical University is the founding body of four health care institutes, including two clinical hospitals: the University Clinical Centre – the MUG Hospital and the Institute of Maritime and Tropical Medicine. Their significance for the health care system is shown in the number of hospitalized patients (almost 60,000), outpatient visits (over 250,000), surgery procedures (over 21,000, including about 1,500 open-heart surgeries) and laboratory tests (over 2 million a year). The clinical hospitals offer medical treatments unavailable anywhere else in Northern Poland, such as: organ transplants (kidneys, bone marrow and heart), radiotherapy and oncological chemotherapy, child and adult hematology, invasive cardiology and electro-cardiology, organ surgery, hyperbaric medicine, tropical and nuclear medicine.

The Medical University of Gdańsk and its hospitals operate locally, as well as outside the region. As a result, they cater for the health and security of around 3.5 million Poles.

== Cooperation ==
The Medical University of Gdańsk provides health care for the people of Pomerania and inhabitants of neighboring regions, as the founder of clinical hospitals and other health-care facilities.

It undertakes work for the public authorities, for example in the Health for Pomerania Programme, which aims at health improvement for the inhabitants of the region. The university is actively involved in work on the Strategy of Pomeranian Voivodship Development, Regional Innovation Strategy and the Pomeranian Voivodship Regional Operational Programme.

The university's initiatives for the community spread awareness of preventive treatment and a healthy lifestyle, e.g. Good Health Picnic (Piknik na Zdrowie) and the local implementation of large-scale prophylaxis programmes. The university actively participates in the Baltic Science Festival.

== The Moryś scandal ==
After a remote lecture on anatomy for first-year students of the Collegium Medicum UMK in Bydgoszcz, there was a discussion among scientists about passing the Internet exams. After the meeting, a critical mistake was made, that is that the microphones were not turned off - something that would horrify the listening students. Specifically, a professor at the Medical University of Gdansk and two professors at the Nicolaus Copernicus University in Bydgoszcz shared methods and bragged on about their methods of reducing student pass rates. The Rector of Medical University of Gdańsk then claimed that what their Professor said was not related to the university.
