= List of people from Vilnius =

Coat of Arms of Vilnius

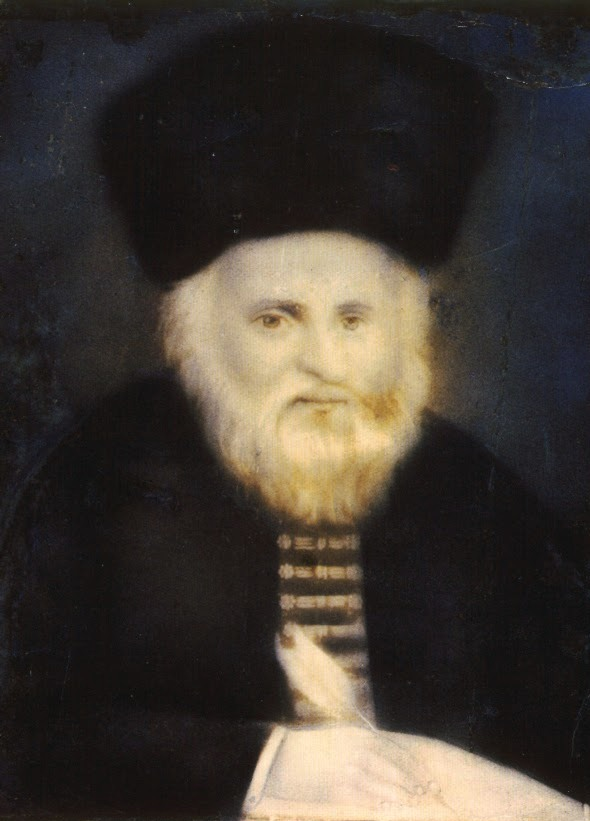
Vilna Gaon

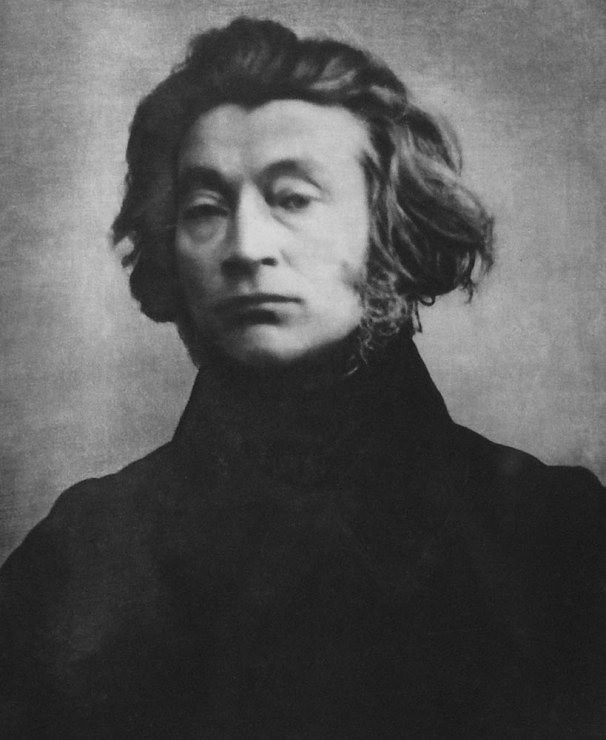
Adam Mickiewicz

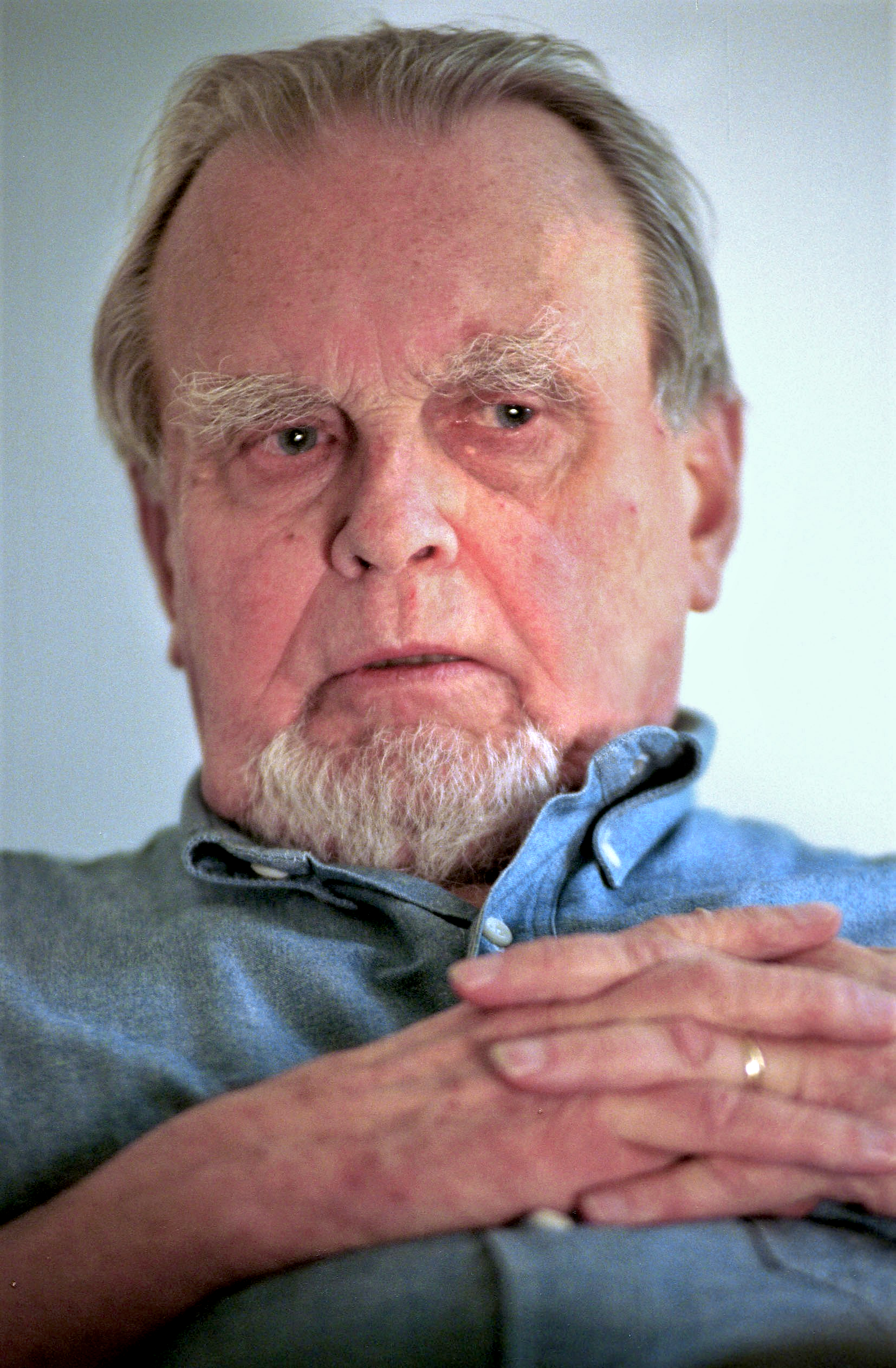
Czesław Miłosz

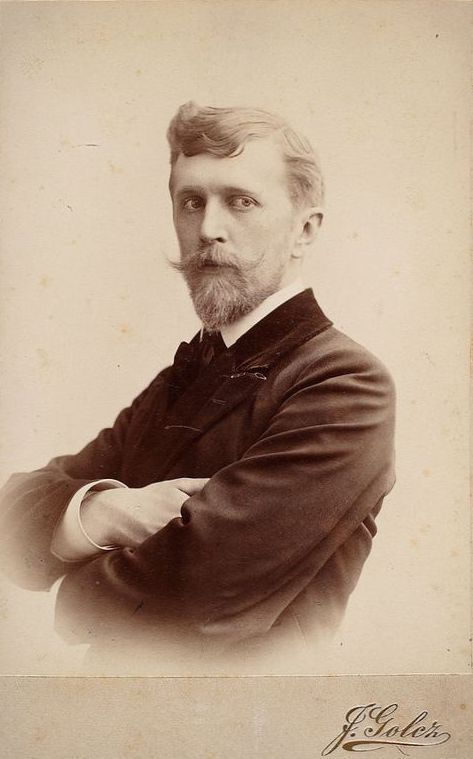
Ferdynand Ruszczyc

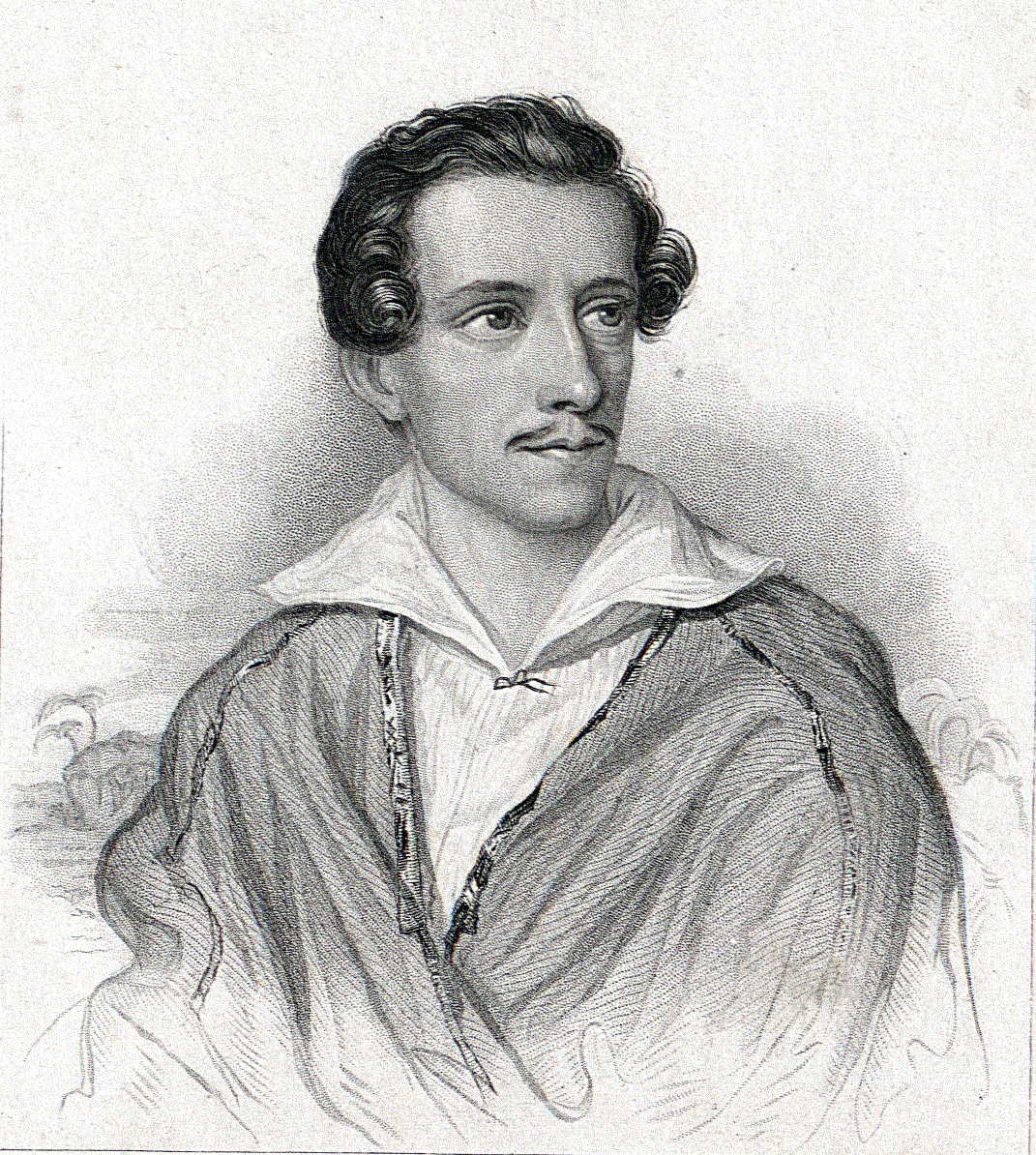
Juliusz Słowacki

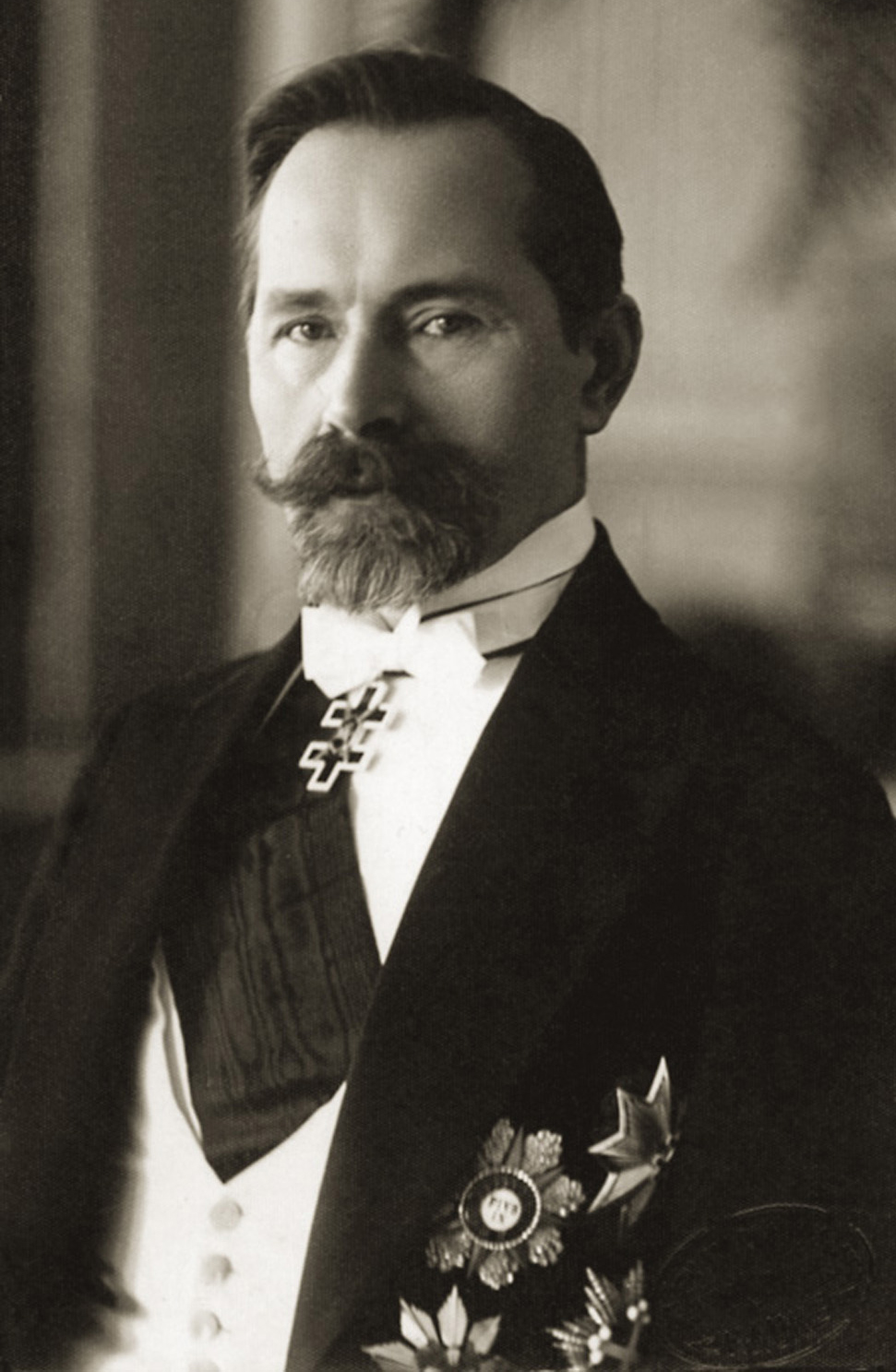
Antanas Smetona

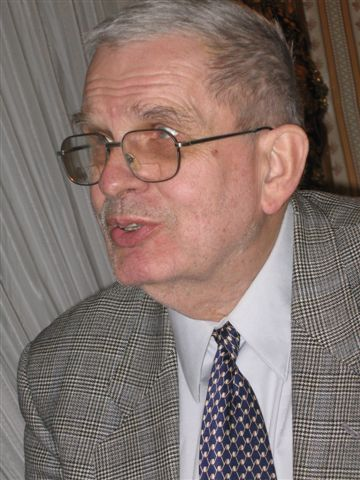
Tomas Venclova

The following is a list of notable people from Lithuania's capital city of Vilnius (historically known by the names of Vilna/Wilna/Wilno). It includes people who were born or resided there.

== A ==
- Abraham ben Elijah of Vilna (c. late 18th century-1808), renowned Jewish Talmudist
- Neringa Aidietytė (born 1983), Lithuanian athlete
- Gediminas Akstinas (born 1961), Lithuanian painter
- Frantsishak Alyakhnovich (1883–1944), Belarusian playwright and journalist
- Algirdas (1296–1377), Grand Duke of Lithuania
- Ana Ambrazienė (1955–2025), Lithuanian hurdler, former world record holder
- Michał Elwiro Andriolli (1836–1893), Polish-Lithuanian painter and architect of Italian descent
- Irena Andriukaitienė (born 1948), Lithuanian politician and signature of the Act of the Re-Establishment of the State of Lithuania
- Mark Antokolsky (1843–1902), Russian-Jewish sculptor
- Laura Asadauskaitė (born 1984), Lithuanian modern pentathlon athlete

== B ==
- Francišak Bahuševič (1840–1900), Belarusian poet.
- Živilė Balčiūnaitė (born 1979), Lithuanian long-distance runner, European champion.
- Aidas Bareikis (born 1967), Lithuanian artist.
- Liutauras Barila (born 1974), Lithuanian Olympic biathlete.
- Jonas Basanavičius (1851–1927), Lithuanian leader of Lithuania's national revival movement.
- Ričardas Berankis (born 1990), Lithuanian the top ranked Lithuanian tennis player of all time.
- Alexander Berkman (1870–1936), Russian-American leading member of the anarchist movement in the early 20th century.
- Boris Birshtein (born 1947), Canadian businessman.
- Mykolas Biržiška (1882–1962), Lithuanian historian of literature, politician, signer of the Act of Independence of Lithuania.
- Vaclovas Biržiška (1884–1956), Lithuanian publisher, historian.
- Eglė Bogdanienė (born 1962), Lithuanian textile artist.
- Kazys Bradūnas (1917–2009), Lithuanian émigré poet and editor.
- Lina Braknytė (born 1952), Lithuanian actress.
- Algirdas Brazauskas (1932–2010), Lithuanian President and Prime Minister.
- Danutė Budreikaitė (born 1953), Lithuanian politician and Member of the European Parliament.
- Kanstancyja Bujło (1893–1986), Belarusian poet and playwright.
- Teodor Bujnicki (1907–1944), Polish poet.
- Jan Bułhak, Polish photographer.
- Vaidas Baumila (born 1987), Lithuanian singer and actor.

== C ==
- Saint Casimir (1458–1484), patron saint of Poland and of the Lithuania.
- Dalius Čekuolis (born 1959), Lithuanian politician.
- Jan Karol Chodkiewicz (1560–1621), Lithuanian politician and hetman.
- César Cui (1835–1918), Russian composer and music critic of French, Polish and Lithuanian descent.

== D ==
- Ingeborga Dapkūnaitė (born 1963), Lithuanian actress.
- Simonas Daukantas (1793–1864), Lithuanian/Samogitian historian, writer, and ethnographer.
- Mikalojus Daukša (1527–1613), publisher of the first printed Lithuanian book in GDL.
- Boris Dekanidze (1962–1995), Lithuanian stateless crime boss.
- Gintaras Didžiokas (born 1966), Lithuanian politician.
- Agnia Ditkovskyte (born 1988), Russian actress of a Lithuanian origin.
- Ignacy Domeyko (1802–1889), Polish geologist, mineralogist and engineer.
- Raminta Dvariškytė (born 1990), Lithuanian Olympic swimmer.
- Dynoro, (born 1999), Lithuanian DJ and musical producer.
- Felix Dzerzhinsky (1877–1926), Bolshevik founder of the Soviet secret police.
- Audrius Dzikaras (born 1957), Lithuanian painter.

== F ==
- Yechezkel Feivel (1755–1833), Polish–Lithuanian Commonwealth Maggid.
- Eduard Robert Flegel (1855–1886) a German explorer, role in the Scramble for Africa.
- Vaclava Fleri (1888–1983), Lithuanian painter.
- Arnas Fedaravicius (born 1991), actor.

== G ==
- Romain Gary (1914–1980), French writer.
- Martynas Gecevičius (born 1988), Lithuanian basketball player.
- Gediminas (c. 1275–1341), Grand Duke of Lithuania, founder of Vilnius city.
- Petras Geniušas (born 1961), Lithuanian classical pianist.
- Marija Gimbutas (1921–1994), Lithuanian archeologist.
- Rolandas Gimbutis (born 1981), Lithuanian swimmer.
- Liudas Gira (1884–1946), Lithuanian poet, writer, and literary critic.
- Johann Christoph Glaubitz (c. 1700–1767), German architect.
- Kęstutis Glaveckas (1949–2021), Lithuanian politician and signature of the Act of the Re-Establishment of the State of Lithuania.
- Alexander Goldberg, (1906-1985) Israeli chemical engineer and President of the Technion – Israel Institute of Technology.
- Judah Leib Gordon (1830–1892), Israeli an important Hebrew poet of the Jewish Enlightenment.
- Antoni Gorecki (1787–1861), Polish writer, poet, soldier.
- Albertas Goštautas (c. 1480–1539), Lithuanian Chancellor of Grand Duchy of Lithuania.
- Mindaugas Griškonis (born 1986), Lithuanian Olympic rower.
- Hubertas Grušnys (1961–2006), Lithuanian media proprietor, in 1989 launched the first-ever private radio station in Lithuania and the post-communist Eastern Europe.
- Dalia Grybauskaitė (born 1956), Lithuanian politician and President of Lithuania.
- Laurynas Gucevičius (1753–1798), Lithuanian architect.
- Daina Gudzinevičiūtė (born 1965), Lithuanian shooter, Olympic gold medalist.
- Asmik Grigorian (born 1981), Lithuanian operatic soprano, named as the best female singer in International Opera Awards 2019.
- Mirga Gražinytė-Tyla (born 1986), Lithuanian conductor, music director of the City of Birmingham Symphony Orchestra (CBSO) in England.
- Stanisław Gudowski (1918–2011) Lithuanian World War II tank commander.

== H ==
- Yusuf Hamied (born 1936), Indian-Lithuanian scientist and businessman.
- Menahem Manesh Hayyut (died 1636), Polish rabbi.
- Jascha Heifetz (1901–1987), Lithuanian-American violinist.
- Ulrich Hosius (1455–1535), German descent from the Grand Duchy of Lithuania.

== I ==
- Juozas Imbrasas (born 1941), Lithuanian former mayor of Vilnius.
- Jurga Ivanauskaitė (1961–2007), Lithuanian writer.
- Victor Ivanoff (1909–1990), South African artist, cartoonist and singer.

== J ==
- Edgaras Jankauskas (born 1975), first Lithuanian footballer to win the UEFA Champions League in 2004.
- Gintaras Januševičius (born 1985), Lithuanian pianist, music educator, event producer, radio presenter, and philanthropist.
- Simas Jasaitis (born 1982), Lithuanian basketball player.
- Rolandas Jasevičius (born 1982), Lithuanian boxer.
- Paweł Jasienica (1909–1970), Polish historian, journalist and soldier.
- Jakub Jasiński (1761–1794), Polish general.
- Władysław II Jagiełło (c. 1352/1362–1434), Grand Duke of Lithuania.
- Arvydas Juozaitis (born 1956), Lithuanian writer, philosopher, politician, swimmer, Olympic bronze medalist.
- Eglė Jurgaitytė (born 1998), Lithuanian singer and radio presenter.

== K ==
- Virgilijus Kačinskas (born 1959), Lithuanian architect and politician, signed the Act of the Re-Establishment of the State of Lithuania.
- Lina Kačiušytė (born 1963), Lithuanian swimmer, Olympic gold medalist.
- Zebi Hirsch Kaidanover (c. 1650–1712), German rabbi and writer.
- Saint Raphael Kalinowski (1835–1907), Polish Discalced Carmelite friar inside the Russian partition of Polish-Lithuanian Commonwealth; teacher, engineer, prisoner of war, royal tutor and priest.
- Ihnat Kančeŭski (pen name: Ihnat Abdziralovič), (1896-1923), Belarusian poet, philosopher and publicist.
- Rita Karin (1919–1993), Polish-born American actress.
- Mieczysław Karłowicz (1876–1909), Polish composer and conductor.
- Rimantas Kaukėnas (born 1977), Lithuanian basketball player.
- Antanas Kavaliauskas (born 1984), Lithuanian professional basketball player, 2005 FIBA Under-21 World Championship gold medalist.
- Nomeda Kazlaus, (born 1974), Lithuanian opera singer appearing internationally, TV Host.
- Valdas Kazlauskas (born 1958), Lithuanian athlete and coach.
- Dvora Kedar (1924–2023), Israeli actress.
- Pavel Fyodorovich Keller (1883–1980), officer of the Imperial Russian Navy (submariner, Captain 1st rank) and of the Romanian Land Forces (intelligence colonel).
- Vytautas Kernagis (1951–2008), Lithuanian singer-songwriter, considered a pioneer of Lithuanian sung poetry.
- Rebeka Kim (born 1998), South Korean figure skater.
- Gediminas Kirkilas (born 1951), Lithuanian politician former Prime Minister of Lithuania.
- Szymon Konarski (1808–1839), Polish radical democratic politician and revolutionary.
- Oskaras Koršunovas (born 1969), Lithuanian theatre director.
- Simon Kovar (born Kovarski) (1890–1970), Russian-born American bassoonist.
- Boris Kowerda (1907–1987), anti-Soviet Belarusian activist convicted of murdering Pyotr Voykov, Soviet ambassador to Poland in Warsaw in 1927.
- Saint Maria Faustina Kowalska (1905–1938), Polish Roman Catholic nun and mystic.
- Józef Ignacy Kraszewski (1812–1887), Polish writer, historian, journalist, scholar, painter and author.
- Andrius Kubilius (born 1956), Lithuanian politician Prime Minister of Lithuania.
- Jonas Kubilius (1921–2011), Lithuanian mathematician who works in probability theory and number theory.
- Abraomas Kulvietis (c. 1509–1545), Lithuanian reformer, publicist.
- Jolanta Kvašytė (born 1956), Lithuanian ceramic artist.

== L ==
- Bernard Ładysz (1922–2020), Polish bass-baritone and actor.
- Vytautas Landsbergis (born 1932), politician, contributed to the demise of the Soviet Union.
- Joachim Lelewel (1786–1861), Polish historian.
- Jacob Liboschütz (1741–1827), physician.
- Romas Lileikis (born 1959), poet, musician, film director.
- Michalo Lituanus, (ca.1500-ca.1550) unidentified humanist author of the 16th century.
- Eduard Lobau (born 1988), Belarusian activist with the nation's democracy movement.
- Józef Łukaszewicz (1863–1928), Polish physicist, geologist and mineralogist.
- Meilė Lukšienė (1913–2009), cultural historian and activist.
- Jolanta Lothe (1942–2022), Polish actress.

== M ==
- Józef Mackiewicz (1902–1985), Polish writer.
- Hillel Noah Maggid (1829–1903), Russian-Jewish genealogist and historian.
- Andrius Mamontovas (born 1967), Lithuanian rock musician.
- Maria Malanowicz-Niedzielska (1899–1943), Polish actress.
- Józef Marcinkiewicz (1910–1940), Polish mathematician.
- Gritė Maruškevičiūtė (born 1989), Lithuanian Miss Lithuania 2010.
- Vilija Matačiūnaitė (born 1986), Lithuanian singer-songwriter, actress.
- Raimundas Mažuolis (born 1972), Lithuanian swimmer, olympic medalist.
- Rachel Messerer (1902–1993), Russian silent film and theatre actress.
- Aleksander Meysztowicz (1864–1943), Polish politician, landowner, and social activist
- Adam Mickiewicz (1798–1855), Polish poet.
- Jeronimas Milius (born 1984), Lithuanian singer.
- Czesław Miłosz (1911–2004), Polish poet, Nobel Prize in Literature.
- Lazar Minor (1855–1942), Russian neurologist.
- Vytautas Miškinis (born 1954), Lithuanian music composer, choral conductor and academic teacher.
- Joanna Moro (born 1984), Lithuanian-born Polish film and theater actress, singer and TV presenter.
- Gediminas Motuza (born 1946), Lithuanian geologist and author of geology textbooks.
- Yana Maksimava (born 1989), Lithuanian-Belarusian heptathlete.
- Andrius Mamontovas (born 1967), Lithuanian rock musician.

== N ==
- Onutė Narbutaitė (born 1956), Lithuanian composer.
- Ludwik Narbutt (1832–1863), Lithuanian military commander.
- Teodor Narbutt (1784–1864), Polish–Lithuanian romantic historian and military engineer.
- Henrikas Natalevičius (born 1953), Lithuanian painter.
- Eimuntas Nekrošius (1952–2018), Lithuanian theatre director.
- Henryk Niewodniczański (1900–1968), Polish physicist.

== O ==
- Nijolė Oželytė-Vaitiekūnienė (born 1954), Lithuanian actress, signed the Act of the Re-Establishment of the State of Lithuania.

== P ==
- Bohdan Paczyński (1940–2007), Polish astronomer.
- Rolandas Paksas (born 1956), Lithuanian politician.
- Jerzy Passendorfer (1923–2003), Polish film director.
- Artūras Paulauskas (born 1953), Lithuanian politician.
- Algirdas Petrulis (1915–2010), Lithuanian painter.
- Józef Piłsudski (1867–1935), Polish politician, military commander and Polish head of state.
- Emilia Plater (1806–1831), Polish revolutionary and female military commander.
- Kazimierz Plater (1915–2004), Polish chess master.
- Martynas Pocius (born 1986), Lithuanian professional basketball player, has played for Lithuania.
- Karol Podczaszyński (1790–1860), Polish architect.
- Romualdas Požerskis (born 1951), Lithuanian photographer.
- Daniel Prenn (1904–1991), Russian-born German, Polish, and British world-top-ten tennis player.
- Airinė Palšytė (born 1992), Lithuanian high jumper.

== R ==
- Antoni Radziwiłł (1775–1833), Polish and Prussian noble, aristocrat, musician and politician.
- Barbara Radziwiłł (Barbora Radvilaitė) (1520–1551), Queen of Polish-Lithuanian Commonwealth.
- Clara Rockmore (1911–1998), Lithuanian classical violin prodigy and a virtuoso performer of the theremin.
- Michał Pius Römer (1880–1945), Lithuanian-Polish rector of Vytautas Magnus University, lawyer.
- Michał Józef Römer (1778–1853), Lithuanian-Polish writer and politician.
- Helena Romer-Ochenkowska (1875–1947) Polish writer, columnist, theatre critic and activist.
- Maria Roszak (1908–2018), Polish nun awarded Righteous Among the Nations.
- Audrius Rudys (born 1951), Lithuanian economist, politician, signed the Act of the Re-Establishment of the State of Lithuania.
- Ferdynand Ruszczyc (1870–1936), Polish painter, printmaker, and stage designer.

== S ==
- Kristina Sabaliauskaitė (born 1974), Lithuanian writer and art historian.
- Kristina Saltanovič (born 1975), Lithuanian athlete.
- Lew Sapieha (1557–1633), Polish–Lithuanian Commonwealth politician and military commander.
- Maciej Kazimierz Sarbiewski (1595–1640), Polish poet.
- Šarūnas Sauka (born 1958), Lithuanian postmodern painter.
- Andrew Schally (1926–2024), Polish-American endocrinologist and Nobel Prize laureate.
- Kalman Schulman (1819–1899), Jewish writer and translator.
- Žydrūnas Savickas (born 1975), Lithuanian Strongman champion.
- Lasar Segall (1891–1957), Brazilian Jewish painter, engraver and sculptor.
- Esther Shalev-Gerz (born 1948), Jewish contemporary artist.
- Kazimierz Siemienowicz (c. 1600 – c. 1651), Polish–Lithuanian Commonwealth military commander, engineer, theorist of artillery and pioneer of rocketry.
- Deividas Sirvydis (born 2000), Lithuanian basketball player in the NBA.
- Konstantinas Sirvydas (1579–1631), Lithuanian lexicographer, writer.
- Piotr Skarga (1536–1612), Polish theologian, writer and the first rector of the Wilno Academy.
- Francysk Skaryna (c. 1490 – 1552), Belarusian humanist, physician, and translato, publisher of first printed Ruthenian Bible.
- Boris Skossyreff (1896–1989), Russian adventurer, international swindler and pretender, King of Andorra.
- Mykolas Sleževičius (1882–1939), Lithuanian lawyer, political and cultural figure, and journalist, Prime Minister of Lithuania.
- Juliusz Słowacki (1809–1849), Polish poet.
- Antanas Smetona (1874–1944), Lithuanian intellectual, journalist and the first publicist, President of Lithuanian Republic.
- Elijah ben Solomon, Gaon mi Vilna (1720–1797), Lithuanian Jewish scholar and Kabbalist.
- Blessed Michał Sopoćko (1888–1975), Polish Apostle of Divine Mercy.
- Jędrzej Śniadecki (1768–1838), Polish writer, physician, chemist, biologist and philosopher.
- Audrius Stonys (born 1966), Lithuanian renowned documentary filmmaker.
- Vytautas Straižys (1936–2021), Lithuanian astronomer, developer of Vilnius photometric system.
- Władysław Syrokomla (1823–1862), Polish poet, writer and translator.
- Deividas Šemberas (born 1978), Lithuanian football player.
- Algirdas Šemeta (born 1962), Lithuanian economist and the European Commissioner for Taxation and Customs Union, Audit and Anti-Fraud.
- Stasys Šilingas (1885–1962), Lithuanian lawyer and statesman, significant figure in the history of Lithuania's independence.
- Wenzel Sukowaty (1746–1810), music copyist
- Tadas Šuškevičius (born 1985), Lithuanian athlete.

== T ==
- Emanuel Tanay (1928–2014), Polish-American Holocaust survivor and American forensic psychiatrist.
- Aurimas Taurantas (born 1956), Lithuanian politician and signature of the Act of the Re-Establishment of the State of Lithuania.
- Yemima Tchernovitz-Avidar (1909–1998), Israeli author.
- Vytautas Tomaševičius (born 1972), Lithuanian painter.
- Auksė Treinytė (born 1952), Lithuanian former sport shooter.
- Eustachy Tyszkiewicz (1814–1873), Polish-Lithuanian historian.

== U ==
- Francišak Umiastoŭski (1882 – 1940?), Belarusian writer, journalist, military leader and a victim of the Katyn massacre
- Antoni Uniechowski (1903–1976), Polish illustrator.

== V ==
- Rimantė Valiukaitė (born 1970), Lithuanian actress.
- Moi Ver (1904–1995), Israeli photographer and painter.
- Alis Vidūnas (1934–2009), Lithuanian politician.
- Jonas Vileišis (1872–1942), Lithuanian lawyer, politician, and diplomat.
- Petras Vileišis (1851–1926), Lithuanian millionaire, mecenate, politician, publisher.
- Tomas Venclova (born 1937), Lithuanian poet, prose writer, scholar, philologist and translator of literature
- Zygmunt Vogel (1764–1826), Polish painter.
- Giedrė Voverienė (born 1968), Lithuanian orienteering competitor.
- Vytautas the Great (1344–1430), Grand Duke of Lithuania.

== W ==
- Chaim Weizmann (1874–1952), Russian-born biochemist, Zionist politician and the first president of Israel.
- Jan Kazimierz Wilczyński (1806–1885), Polish-Lithuanian archaeologist.
- Antoni Wiwulski (1877–1919), Polish-Lithuanian architect and sculptor.
- Tadeusz Wróblewski (1858–1925), Polish noble, politician, lawyer, bibliophile and cultural activist.

== Y ==
- Dov Yaffe (1928–2017), Polish-born Israeli rabbi, mashgiach, and leader of the Musar movement.

== Z ==
- Ludwik Zamenhof (1859–1917), Polish philologist, creator of Esperanto.
- Albert Żamett (1821–1876), Polish–Russian landscapes painter.
- Tomasz Zan (1796–1855), Polish–Belarusian poet and activist.
- Alexander Zass (1888–1962) Russian strongman, professional wrestler, and animal trainer.
- Aleksander Zawadzki (1859–1926), Polish political and educational activist, publicist.
- Yitzhak Zuckerman (1915–1981), Polish–Israeli one of the leaders of the Warsaw Ghetto Uprising.
- Robertas Žulpa (born 1960), Lithuanian swimmer, Olympic champion.
- Artūras Zuokas (born 1968), mayor of Vilnius city municipality (2000–2007 and 2011–2015), Lithuanian politician.
