= Audrius =

- Gender: Male
- Language: Lithuanian

Origin
- Meaning: Storm
- Region of origin: Lithuania

Other names
- Related names: Audrė

Audrius is a Lithuanian masculine given name, derived from the Lithuanian word audra, which means "storm". The female variant is Audronė. The name may refer to:

- Audrius Beinorius (born 1964), Lithuanian philosopher
- Audrius Butkevičius (born 1960), Lithuanian politician
- Audrius Dzikaras (born 1957), Lithuanian painter
- Audrius Kšanavičius (born 1977), Lithuanian footballer
- Audrius Nakas (born 1967), Lithuanian politician
- Audrius Raizgys (born 1969), Lithuanian triple jumper
- Audrius Rubežius (born 1966), Lithuanian singer
- Audrius Rudys (born 1951), Lithuanian politician
- Audrius Šlekys (1975–2003), Lithuanian footballer
- Audrius Stonys (born 1966), Lithuanian filmmaker
- Audrius Žuta (born 1969), Lithuanian footballer
