= Aurimas =

- Gender: Male

Origin
- Region of origin: Lithuania

Aurimas is a masculine Lithuanian given name. Notable people with the name include:

- Aurimas Adomavičius (born 1993), Lithuanian rower
- Aurimas Didžbalis (born 1991), Lithuanian weightlifter
- Aurimas Kieža (born 1982), Lithuanian basketball player
- Aurimas Kučys (born 1981), Lithuanian footballer
- Aurimas Lankas (born 1985), Lithuanian sprint canoeist
- Aurimas Majauskas (born 1993), Lithuanian basketball player
- Aurimas Taurantas (born 1956), Lithuanian politician
- Aurimas Valaitis (born 1988), Lithuanian swimmer
- Aurimas Vertelis (born 1986), Lithuanian footballer
- Aurimas Vilkaitis (born 1993), Lithuanian footballer
