= Józefów =

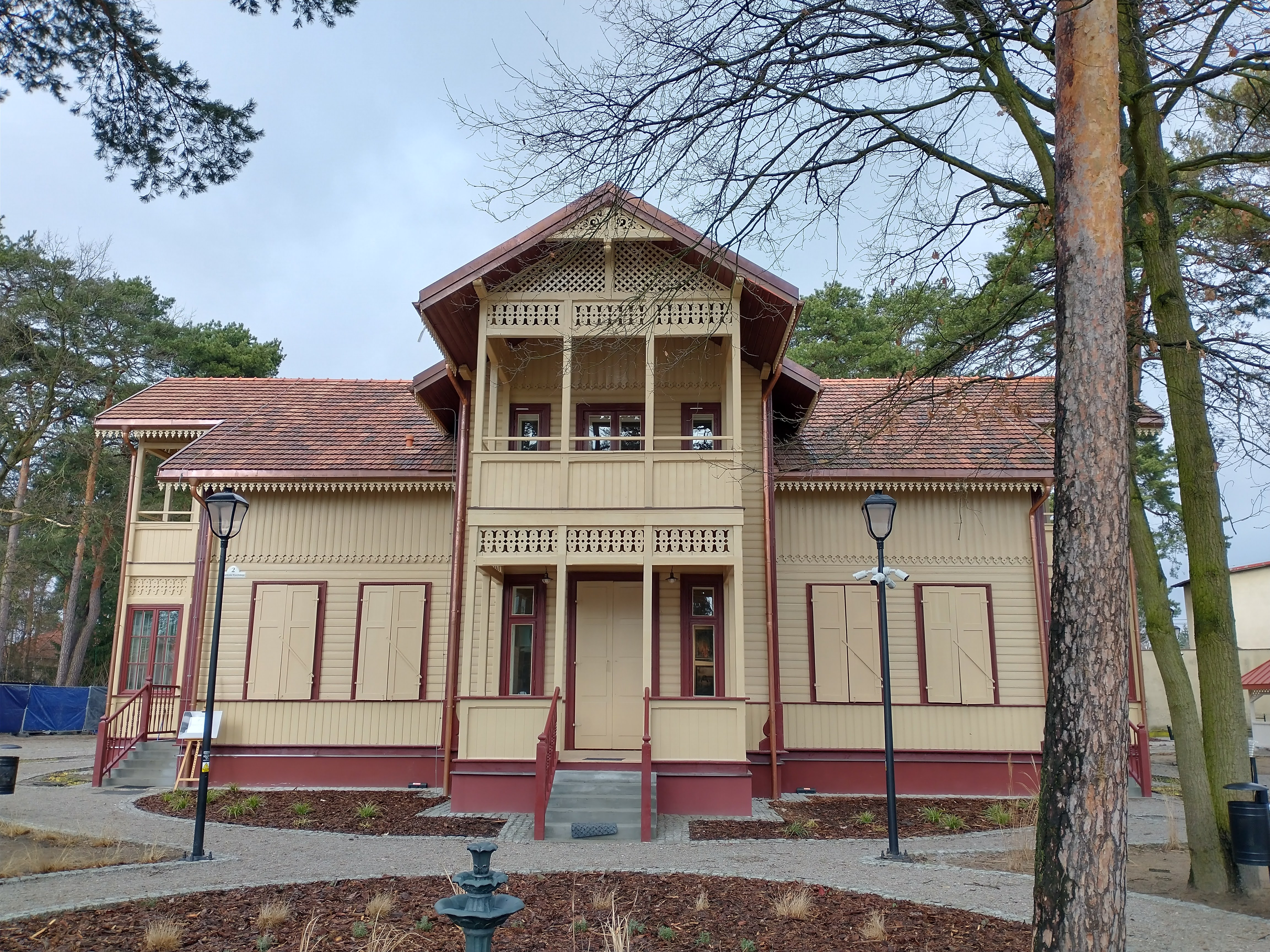
- Świdermajer style villa in Józefów

- Flag Coat of arms

- Location within Poland
- Coordinates: 52°8′8″N 21°14′13″E
- Country: Poland
- Voivodeship: Masovian
- County: Otwock
- Gmina: Józefów (urban gmina)
- Town rights: 1962

Government
  - Mayor: Marek Banaszek

Area
  - Total: 23.92 km^{2} (9.24 sq mi)
- Elevation: 94 m (308 ft)

Population (2019)
  - Total: 20,605
  - Density: 861.4/km^{2} (2,231/sq mi)
- Time zone: UTC+1 (CET)
  - Summer (DST): UTC+2 (CEST)
- Postal code: 05-420, 05-410
- Area code: +48 22
- Car plates: WOT
- Website: http://jozefow.pl

Józefów (Polish pronunciation: [juˈzɛfuf]) is a town in east-central Poland, located in Masovian Voivodeship, in Otwock County, in the Warsaw metropolitan area. Located on a picturesque confluence of Vistula and Świder rivers, it is home to one landscape reserve and three natural reservation zones. As of 2006 it had 18,157 inhabitants.

The town is known for its abundance of historic houses and villas in the unique local Świdermajer style.

== Gallery ==
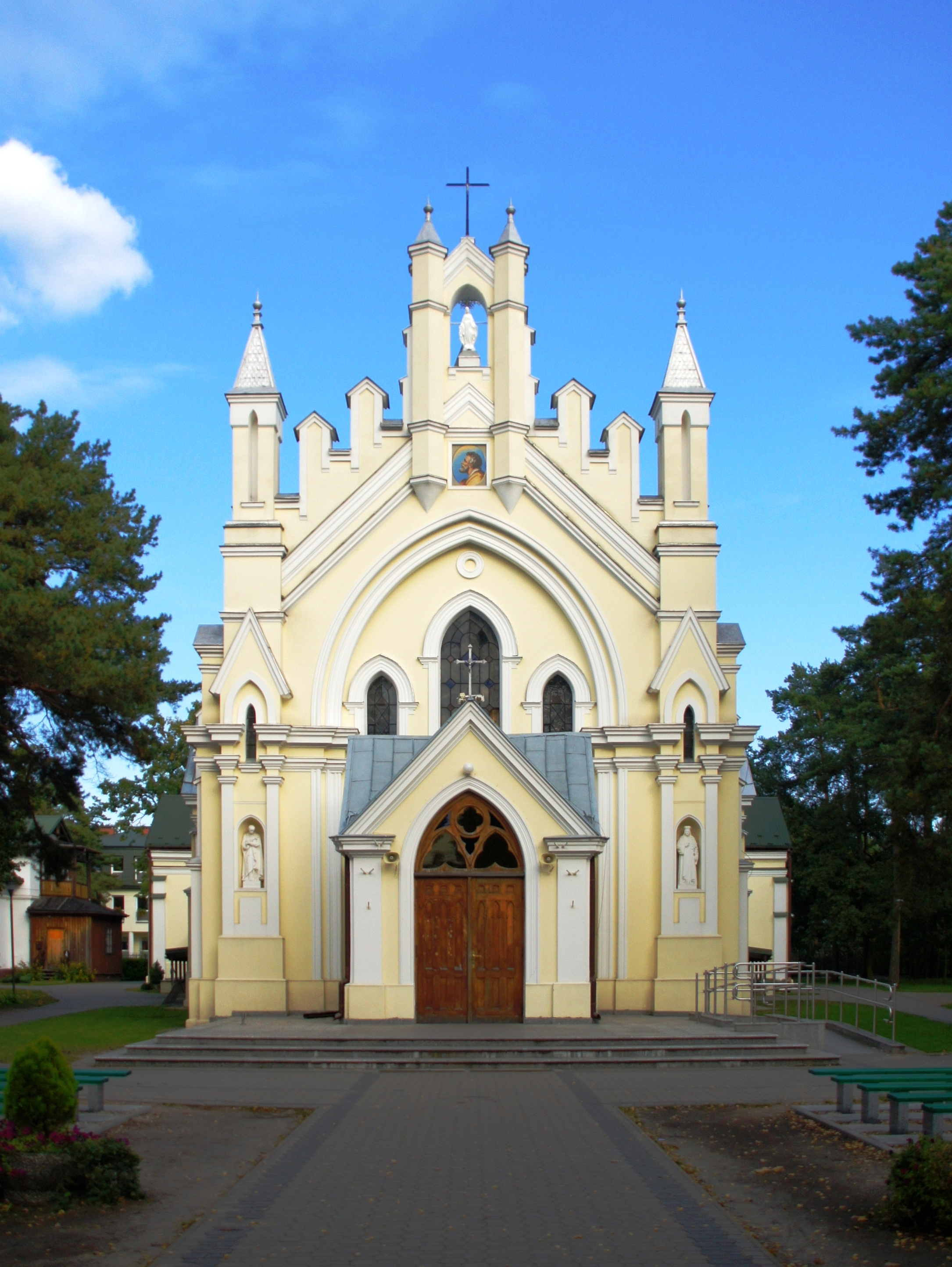
Church of the Black Madonna of Częstochowa

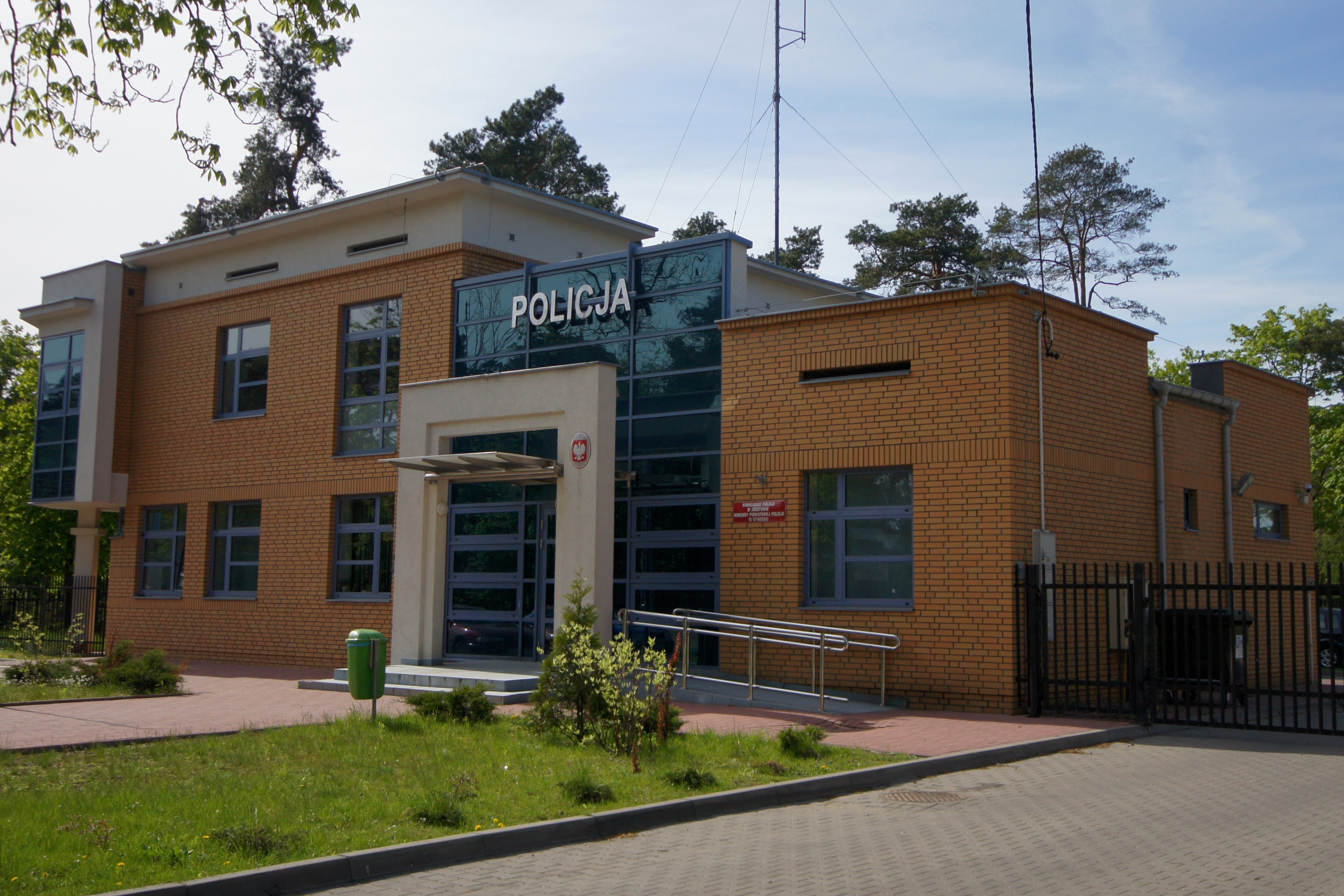
Police station

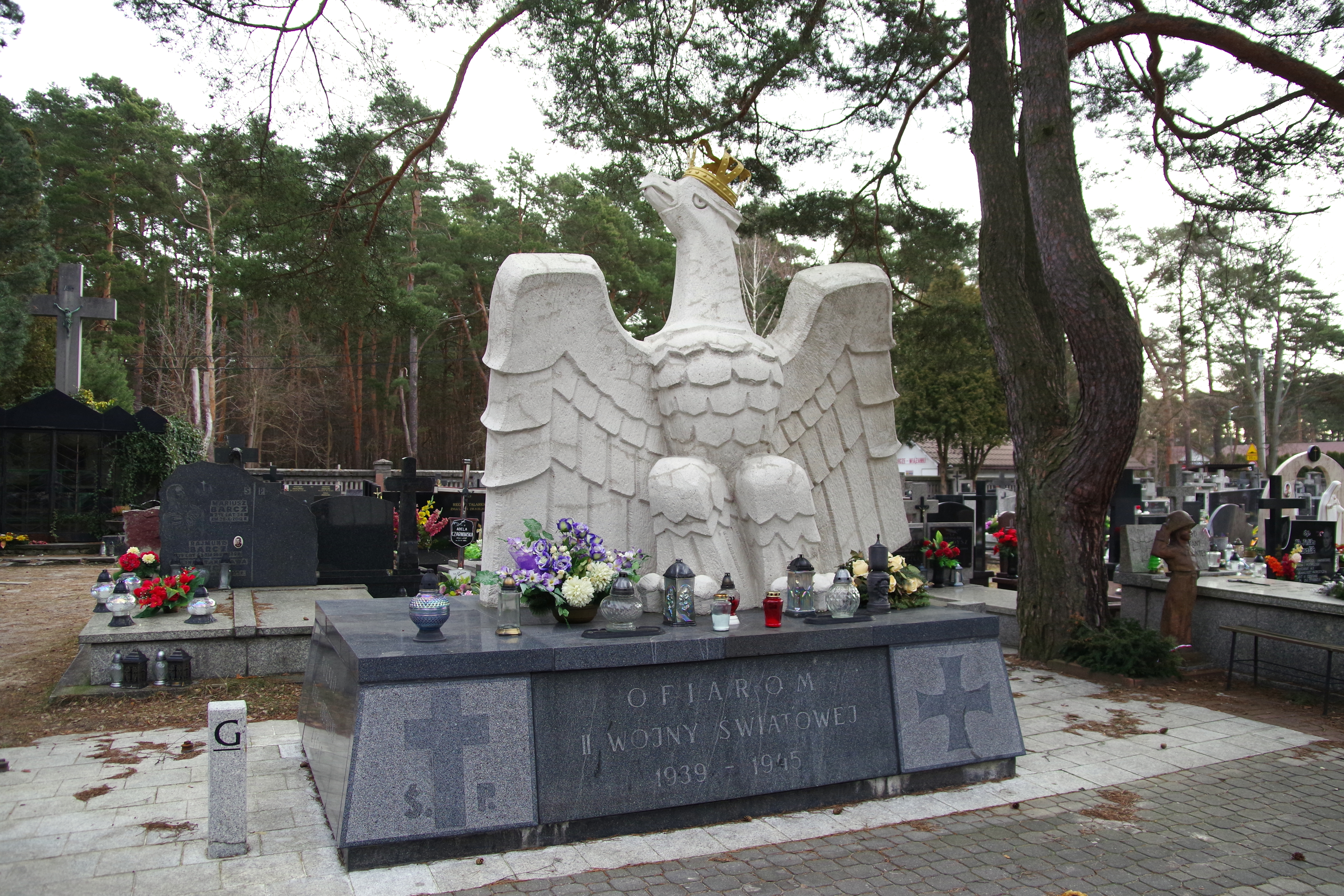
Second World War Victims Monument
