= Świdermajer =

Style of architecture unique to Warsaw, Józefów and Otwock in Poland

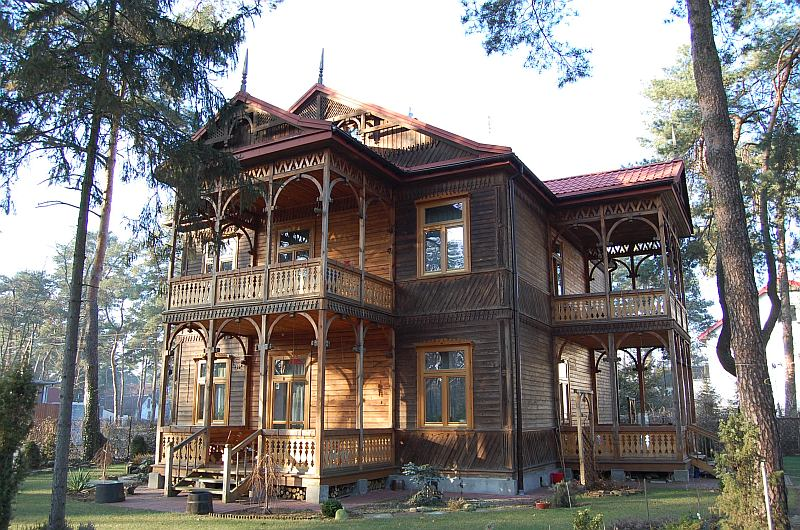
- Villa Lodusieńka in Radość, Warsaw
- Location: Warsaw, Józefów and Otwock in Poland
- Major figures: Michał Elwiro Andriolli
- Influences: Biedermeier

Świdermajer (pronounced [ɕfidɛrˈmajɛr]) is a distinct Polish architectural style developed in late 19th and early 20th century in Masovia along the railroad linking Warsaw with Otwock. The style was applied almost exclusively to wooden villas of the middle classes. The buildings are located in right-bank Warsaw, Józefów and Otwock.

== Origins ==
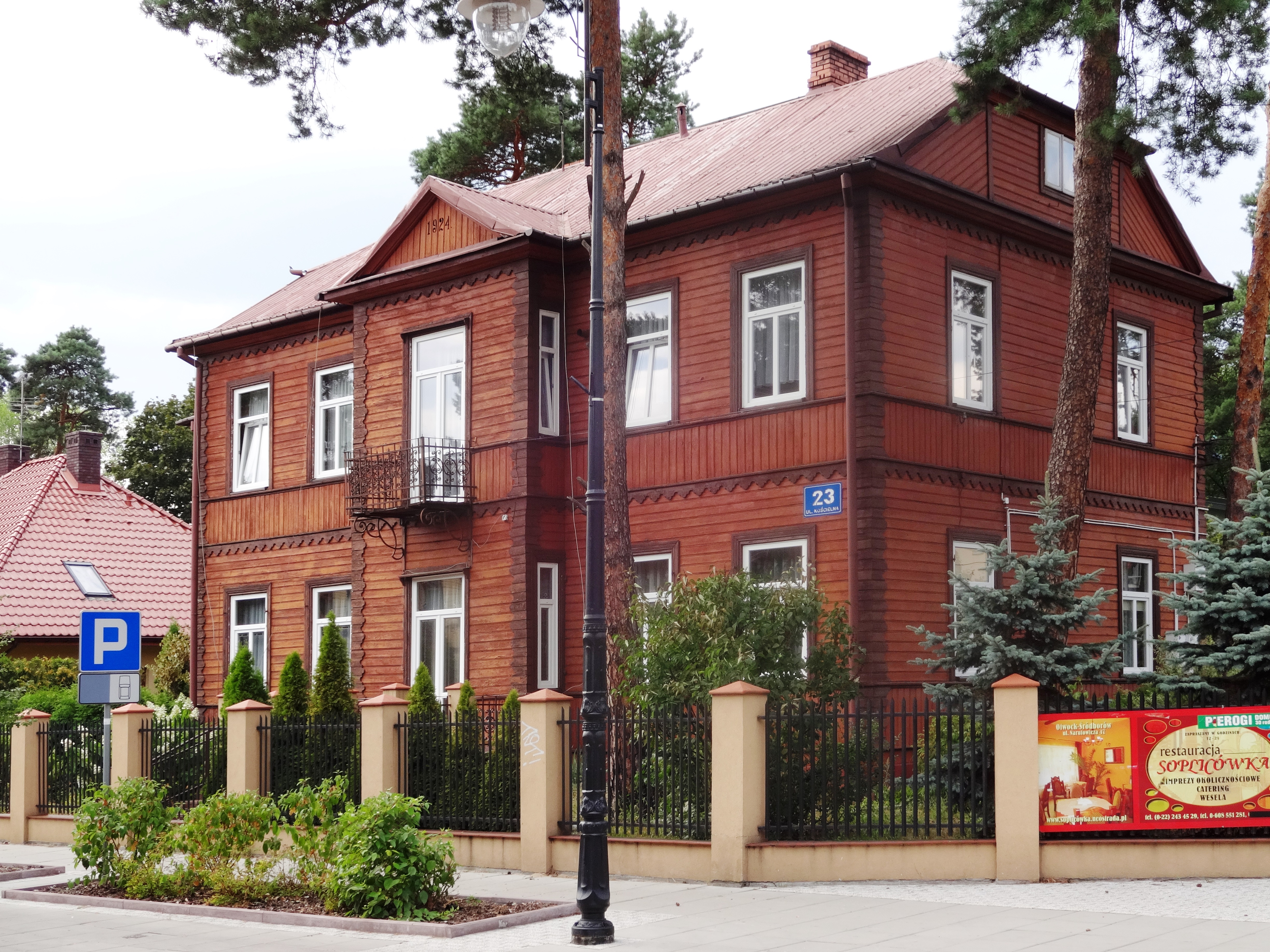
Pension in Otwock

The name Świdermajer was a play on the words "Biedermeier" and "Świder", the latter being the name of both a river along which a number of villas were built and a village between Warsaw and Otwock considered the 'Świdermajer capital'. As a local neologism, the word was popularized by Konstanty Ildefons Gałczyński in an epigram called Wycieczka do Świdra.

Developed by Michał Elwiro Andriolli, the style combined traditional elements of local wooden architecture with the Swiss style popular after the world fair in Vienna of 1873 (wide roofs), Russian traditional houses of the common people (wooden porches with windows) and some elements of the decorative art from the Podhale region (Zakopane Style).
