= Hiacynt Alchimowicz =

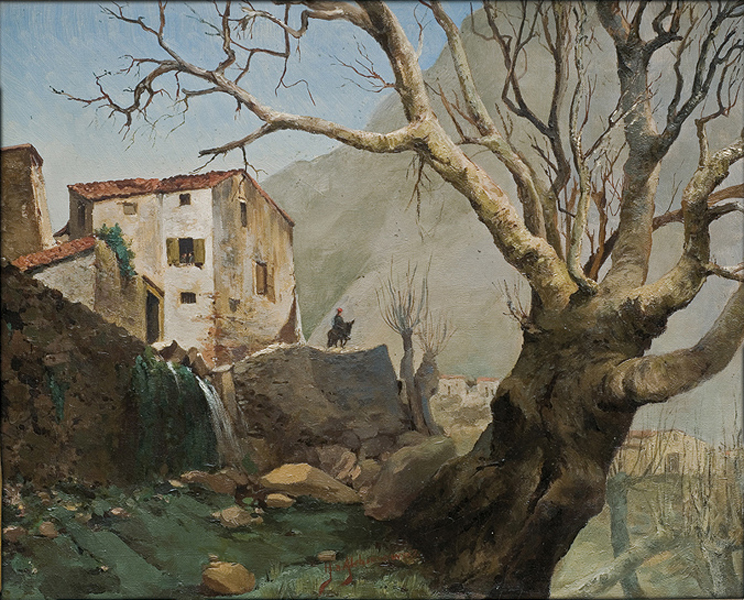
Landscape in the Pyrenees

Hiacynt Alchimowicz (11 September 1841 – after 1897) was a Polish painter in the Classical style who specialized in watercolor landscapes. His older brother was the painter Kazimierz Alchimowicz.

== Biography ==
He was born in Dziembrów, Vilna Governorate. He began his artistic studies in Vilnius with Kanuty Rusiecki. Together with Kazimierz, he participated in the January Uprising. His brother was exiled to Siberia for six years, but he was able to escape to France and settled in Perpignan, where he initially supported himself by working as a construction draftsman for a railway company.

In 1872, when the construction work ended, he resumed his studies. In 1876, he became a drawing teacher at the Polytechnic School and the women's lyceum. Later, he spent some time studying in Paris, where he made the acquaintance of Michał Elwiro Andriolli, who helped him obtain work doing some illustrations. In 1892, he was awarded the Ordre des Palmes Académiques.

He exhibited in Paris and throughout southern France. As of 1897, he was still known to be living in Perpignan. He apparently never returned to Poland, although his works were exhibited there in 1901 and 1904.
