= Radość, Warsaw =

Neighbourhood of Warsaw, Poland

Radość
- City Information System area (neighbourhood)
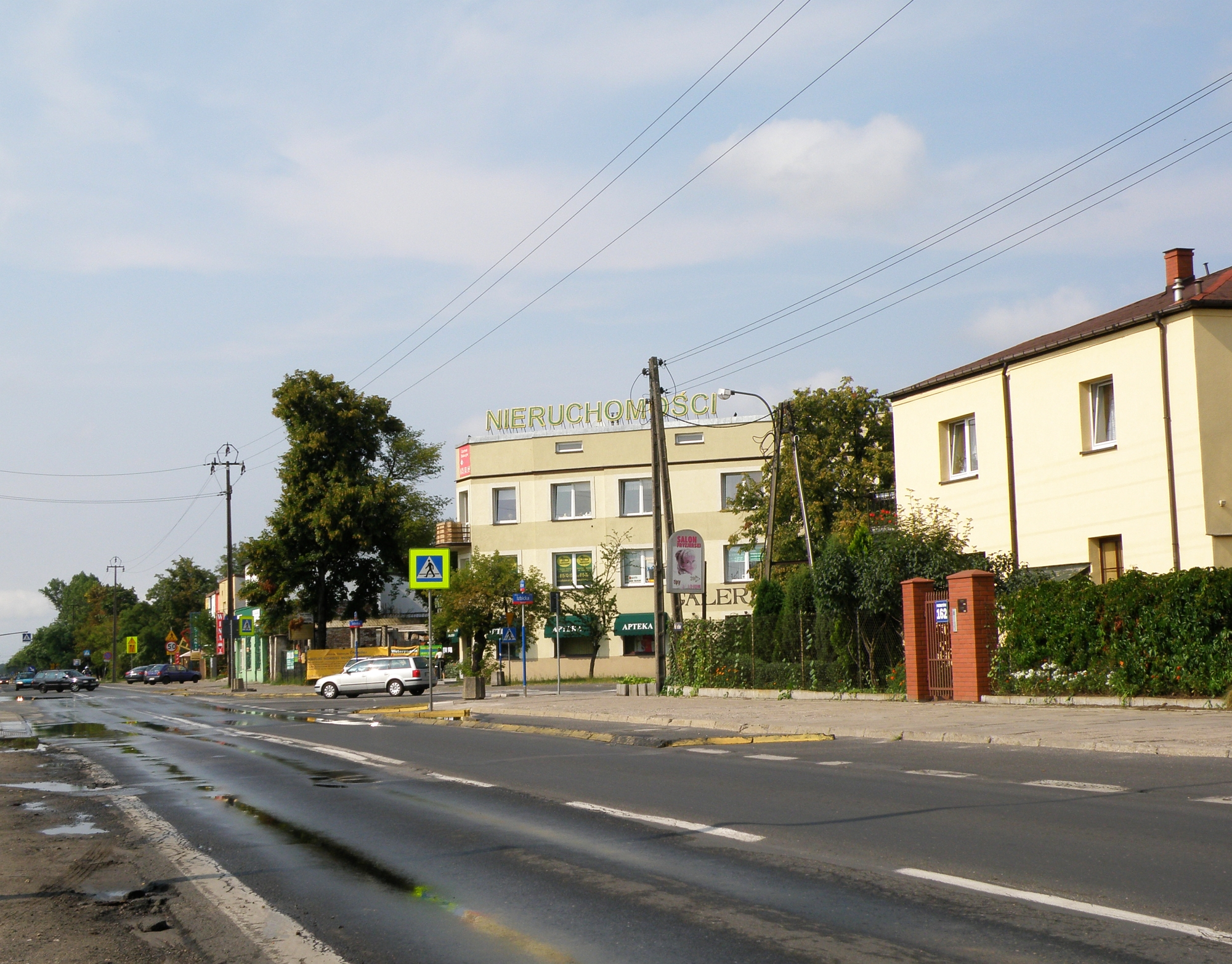
- Patriotów Street in Radość, in 2008.
- Interactive map of Radość
- Coordinates: 52°11′08″N 21°11′14″E
- Country: Poland
- Voivodeship: Masovian
- City and county: Warsaw
- District: Wawer
- Seat: 19 Wilgi Street, Warsaw
- Time zone: UTC+1 (CET)
  - Summer (DST): UTC+2 (CEST)
- Area code: +48 22

Radość (Polish: [ˈra.dɔɕt͡ɕ]) is an administrative neighbourhood and a City Information System area, in Warsaw, Poland, located within the district of Wawer. It is a residential area of single-family housing.

In the 15th century, in this area the villages of Borków, Zagóźdź, and Zbójna Góra. were founded. At the end of the 19th century a small holiday village of Radość near Zbójna Góra was founded. In the early 20th century Nowy Miedzeszyn. was also established. In 1951, the area was incorporated into Warsaw.

== Etymology ==
The name of the neighbourhood comes from Polish word radość, meaning joy. When originally founded, in the late 19th century, it was briefly known as Maciorowe Bagno, with the name coming from a nearby peatland to the east with the same name.

== History ==
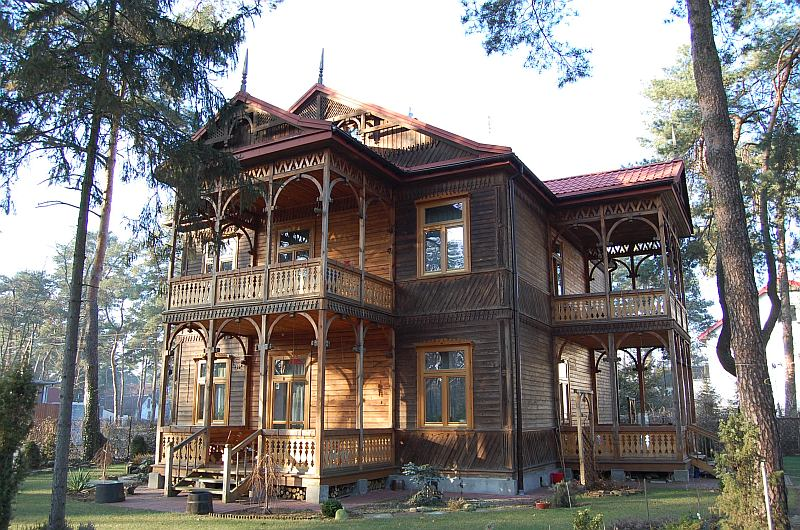
The Lodusieńka Villa, built in 1934, an example of świdermajer style distinct to the area in the early 20th century. Photography made in 2007.

In the 15th century in the area were founded the villages of Borków, Zagóźdź, and Zbójna Góra.

At the end of the 19th century, near Zbójna Góra was founded a small holiday village of Radość, originally also referred to as Maciorowe Bagno. There were constructed several summer houses in the świdermajer style distinct to the local area. This included the Little Rooster Villa at 33 and 35 Junaków Street, opened in 1912, and from 1918, owned by actor Antoni Fertner.

In 1906, there was opened the Warszawa Radość railway station, located at the current Partriotów Street. It was operated as part of the Vistula Railway line. In the late 1910s, there were also opened two narrow-gauge railway stations of the Jabłonna Railway line. They were Radość Wąskotorowa at Mozaikowa Street, opened in 1914, and Borków Warszawski at Mrówcza Street, opened in 1918. Both were closed in 1951.

In 1921, Zbójna Góra and Radość together had a population of 294 people. By 1921 to the east was also founded the holiday village of Nowy Miedzeszyn.

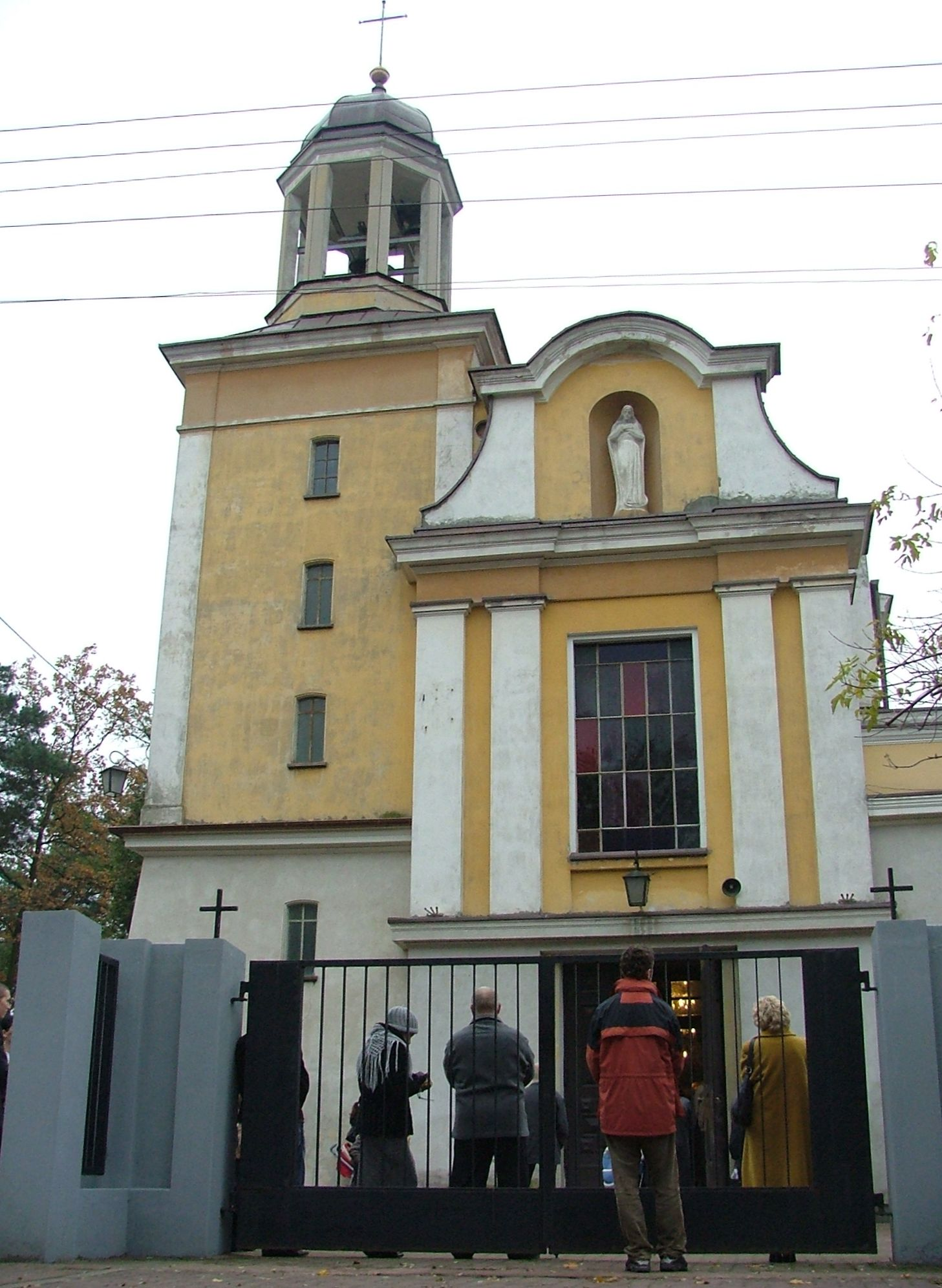
The Catholic Church of Our Lady of the Angels in Radość, constructed in 1931. Photography made in 2007.

Between 1922 and 1931, at 14 Wilgi Street was constructed the Catholic Church of Our Lady of the Angels. In 1932, nearby at Izbicka Street was opened the Radość Cemetery operated by the parish. Additionally, at Kwitnącej Akacji Street was also the Radość Jewish Cemetery, which remained open until 1937.

Overtime Zbójna Góra and Radość begun merging into one settlement, and by 1932, the entire area was referred to as Radość.

In 1934, at 6 Herbaciana Street was also constructed the Lodusieńka Villa. In 1936, the Vistula Railroad was electrified, and the Warszawa Radości railway station was rebuilt in the modernist style. In the village were also a primary school, post office and police station.

In 1943, during the Second World War, in Radość was operated a radio communication station of the Polish Workers' Party. After the war, it stopped being a holiday village, and developed into a residential area.

On 14 May 1951, the area was incorporated into the city of Warsaw.

In 2004, the district of Wawer was subdivided into the areas of the City Information System, with Radość becoming one of them. It also included Borków, Nowy Miedzeszyn, Zagóźdź, and Zbójna Góra.

== Characteristics ==
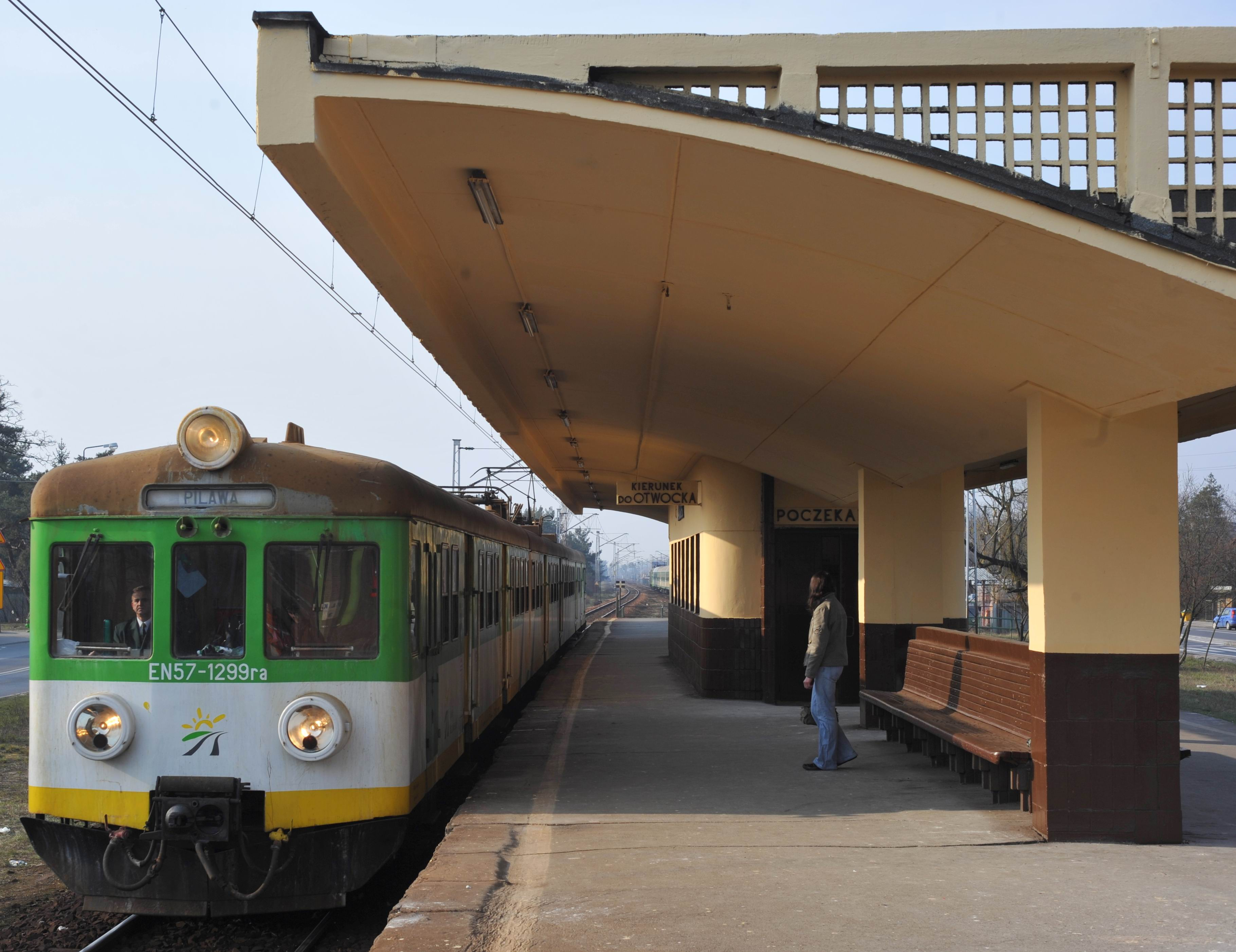
The Warszawa Radość railway station in 2008.

Radość is a residential area of single-family housing. It is an administrative neighbourhood, governed by a neighbourhood council. Its seat is located at 19 Wilgi Street. It also includes neighbourhoods of Borków, Nowy Miedzeszyn, Zagóźdź, and Zbójna Góra.

One of the oldest historical buildings in the neighbourhood is the Little Rooster Villa at 33 and 35 Junaków Street, which, dating to 1912, was one of the first brick buildings constructed there. At 6 Herbaciana Street is also located the Lodusieńka Villa from 1934, which is an example of the świdermajer architectural style, which has developed in the area, at the turn of the 20th century.

At Partriotów Street is located the Warszawa Radość railway station. Its building, constructed in 1936 in the modernist style, has the status of cultural property.

At 14 Wilgi Street is locatef the constructed the Catholic Church of Our Lady of the Angels, dating to 1931. There are also located the Radość Cemetery at Izbicka Street, and Radość Jewish Cemetery at Kwitnącej Akacji Street. Additionally, at 35 and 39 Szczytnowska Street is placed the Warsaw Baptist Theological Seminary.
