= Kazimierz Alchimowicz =

Lithuanian-born Polish romantic painter

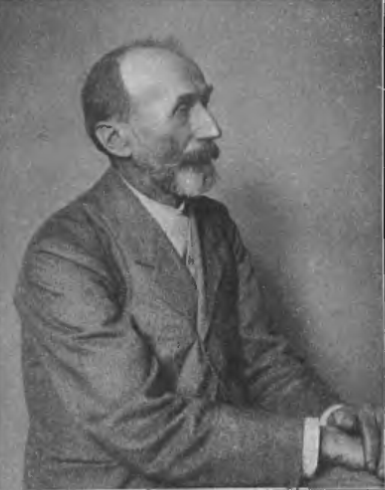
- Kazimierz Alchimowicz; from Tygodnik Illustrowany
- Born: Kazimierz Alchimowicz; 1840; Dziembrów, Vilna Governorate, Russian Empire
- Died: 1916 (aged 75–76); Warsaw
- Known for: Painter

Kazimierz Alchimowicz (December 20, 1840 – December 31, 1916) was a Polish romantic painter born in the Vilna Governorate of the Russian Empire (present-day Belarus). He is considered one of the last major artists of the Romantic tradition in Polish painting.

== Biography ==
He was born in Dziembrów, Vilna Governorate, and was raised and educated in Vilnius. He originally worked as an estate manager near Kyiv and was banished to Siberia for six years of hard labor for his participation in the January Uprising (1863) in Lithuania. He was sent beyond the Urals to Verkhoturye, where he began drawing to relieve the monotony and later sold drawings with nature motifs and religious themes to support himself. After his return (1869), he enrolled in a drawing class in Warsaw, taught by Wojciech Gerson and sponsored by the Imperial Academy of Arts. During this time, he was awarded two silver medals by the Academy. From 1873 to 1875 he studied art in Munich at the Academy of Fine Arts, Munich, in the studio of Alexander von Wagner.

From 1876 to 1878, he lived in Paris and exhibited at the Salon (and in Ghent). For a time, he worked as the head of a studio in Fontainebleau, where he painted porcelain and faience, but he soon resigned and returned to Warsaw, where he established his own studio in 1880. After 1890, he taught drawing at a private school operated by the art pedagogue Bronisława Poświkowa (1855–1902).

His artistic inspiration came mainly from peasant life and history; he was influenced by Gerson and Aleksander Lesser. He painted late-Romantic landscapes of the Vilnius Region, the Tatra Mountains, and France, as well as historical and legendary scenes connected with Lithuania. He also produced portraits, religious paintings and polychrome murals, and worked in clay and wood sculpture, porcelain and faience painting, and mural decoration. He exhibited in Kraków (1873–1902), Warsaw (1874–1912), Paris (1881–1900), Vienna (1882 International Art Exhibition), Vilnius (1888–1915), Odessa, and Munich. His painting Funeral of Grand Duke of Lithuania Gedyminas (1888) won awards twice.

The grave of Kazimierz Alchimowicz at the Old Powązki cemetery in Warsaw

Among his most noted works is a tableau of scenes entitled Goplana, inspired by the play Balladyna by Juliusz Słowacki (exhibited in Kraków in 1894 to enthusiastic critical reception). He also created a tableau of twelve drawings and later a series of twelve paintings (1898) and graphics (1903) based on the Polish historical poem Pan Tadeusz, by Adam Mickiewicz. In addition to his painting, he created religious murals—including the polychromy (1908–1910) in the Stara Błotnica sanctuary of the Church of the Nativity of the Blessed Virgin Mary, and works such as Najświętsza Maria Panna for a church in Zakopane and Święta Trójca for Lublin Cathedral—and tried his hand at wood carving (e.g. a crucifix for the church in Brzeziny). His works were highly popular at home and abroad; a large collection of his work is held by the National Museum in Warsaw.

His younger brother, Hiacynt (1841–1897), who lived in France, was also a painter.

Alchimowicz died on December 31, 1916, in the Hospital of the Infant Jesus, Warsaw, and is buried at Powązki Cemetery (quarter 172, row 3, grave 24). A street in Grodno is named after him.

== Gallery ==
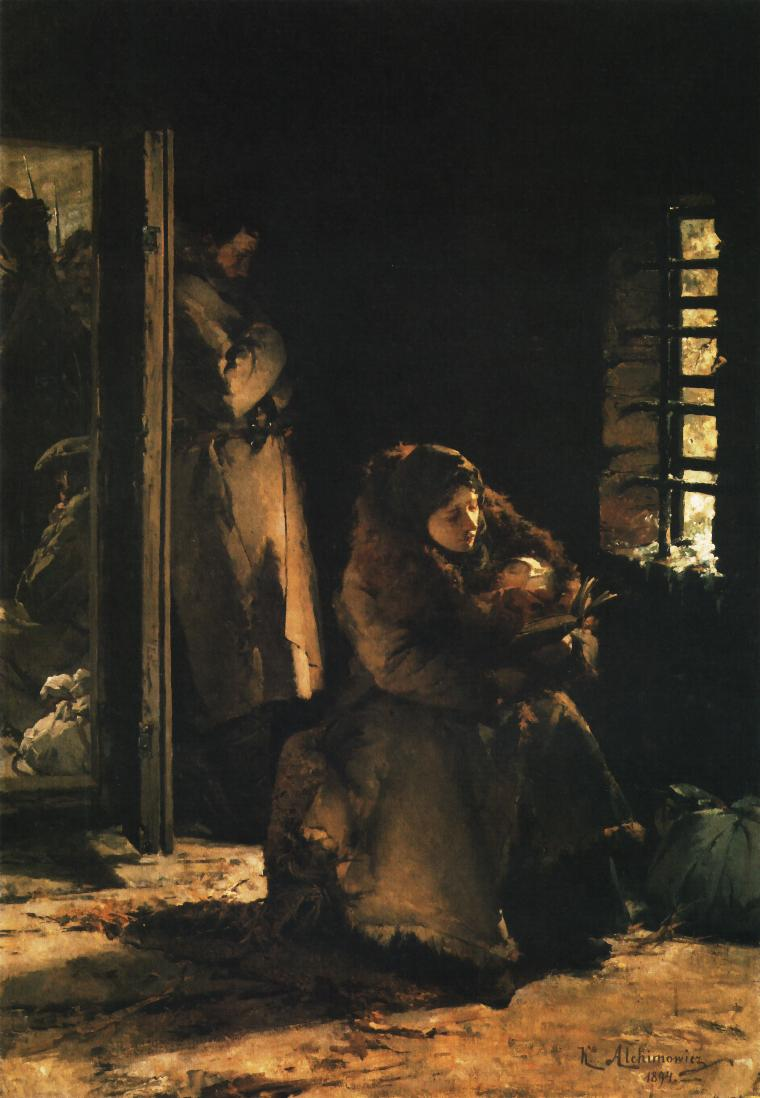
The Halting Place (1894)

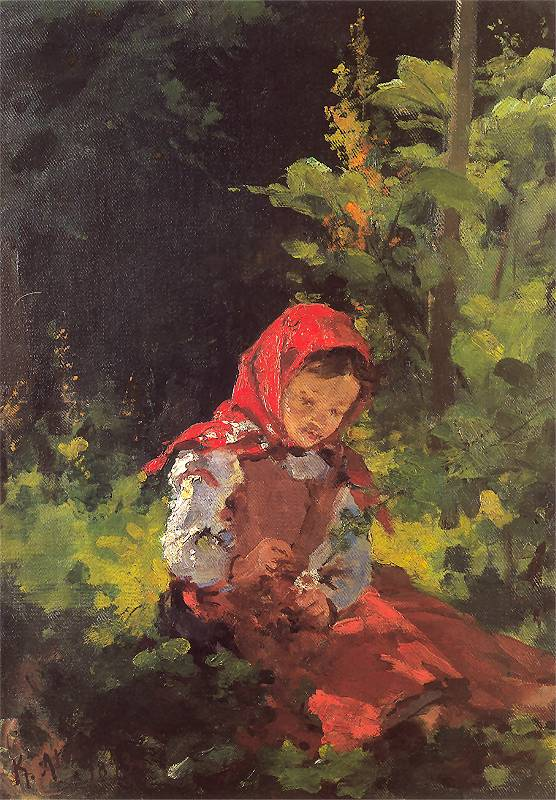
The Girl in the Woods

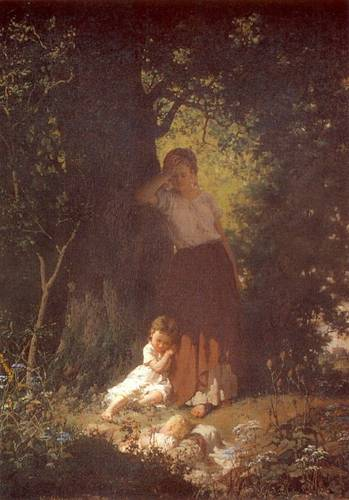
Summer Day

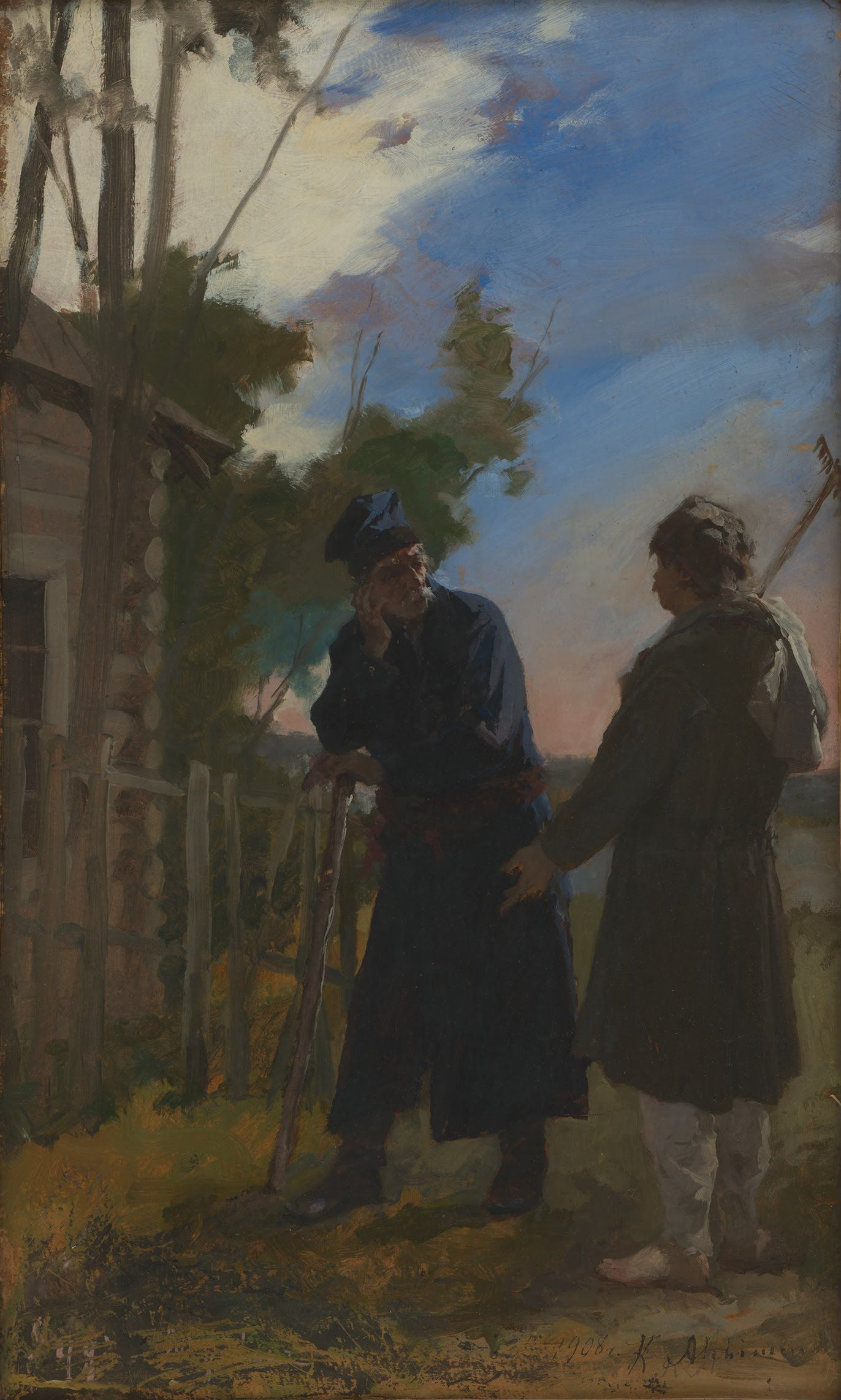
The Nobleman and the Peasant (1908)

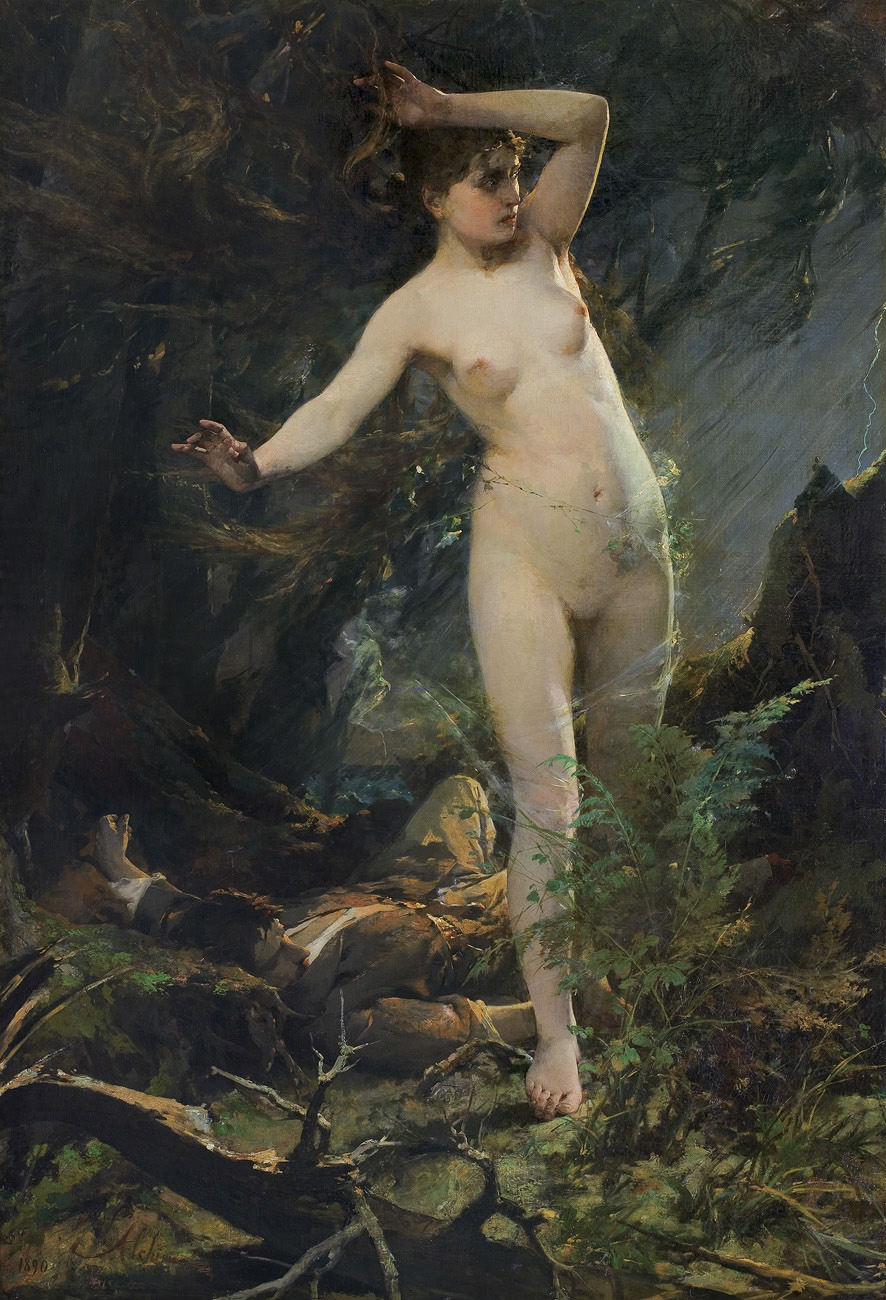
Milda (1890)

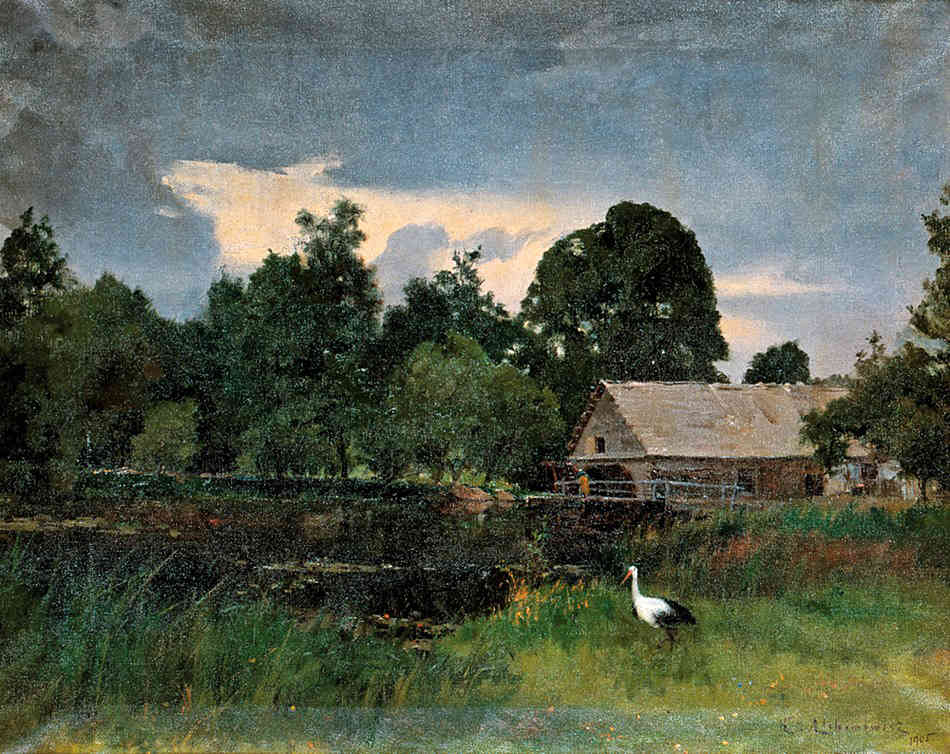
Landscape with a Stork

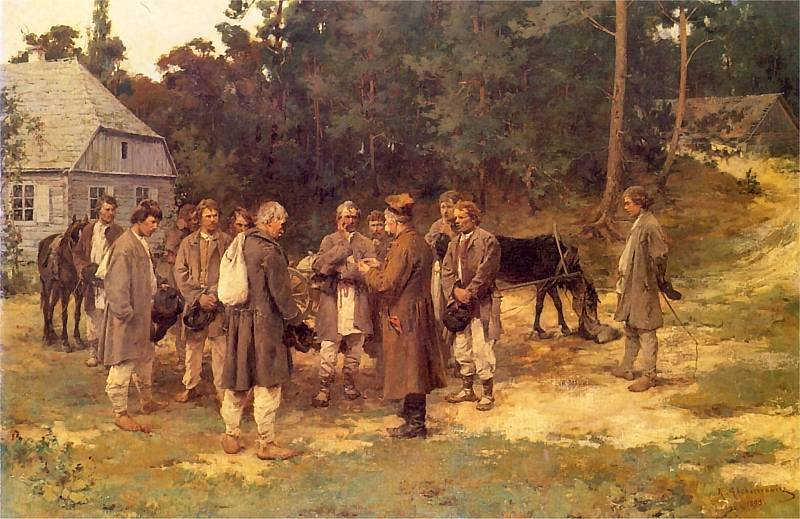
Hiring Workers

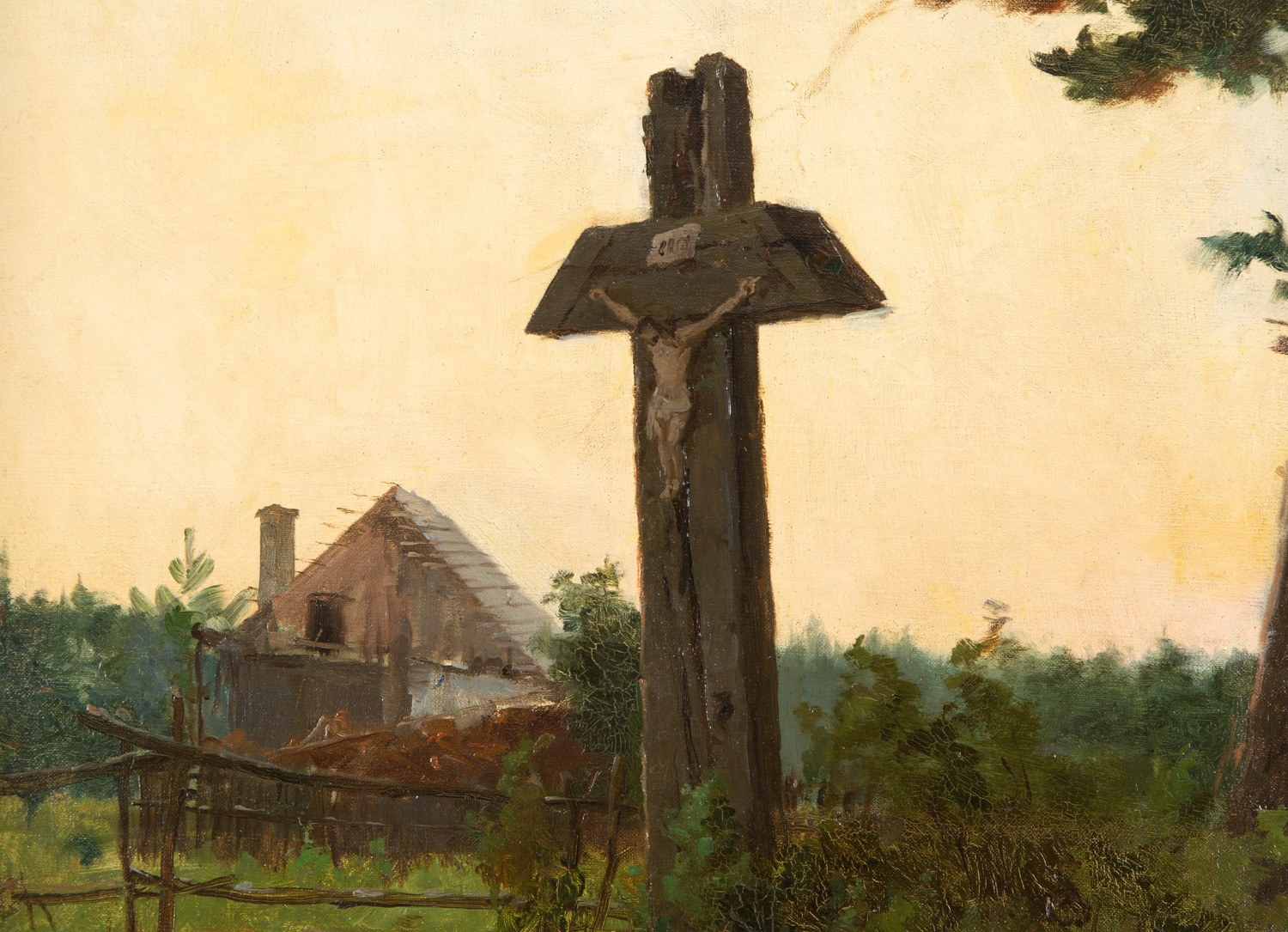
Wayside cross

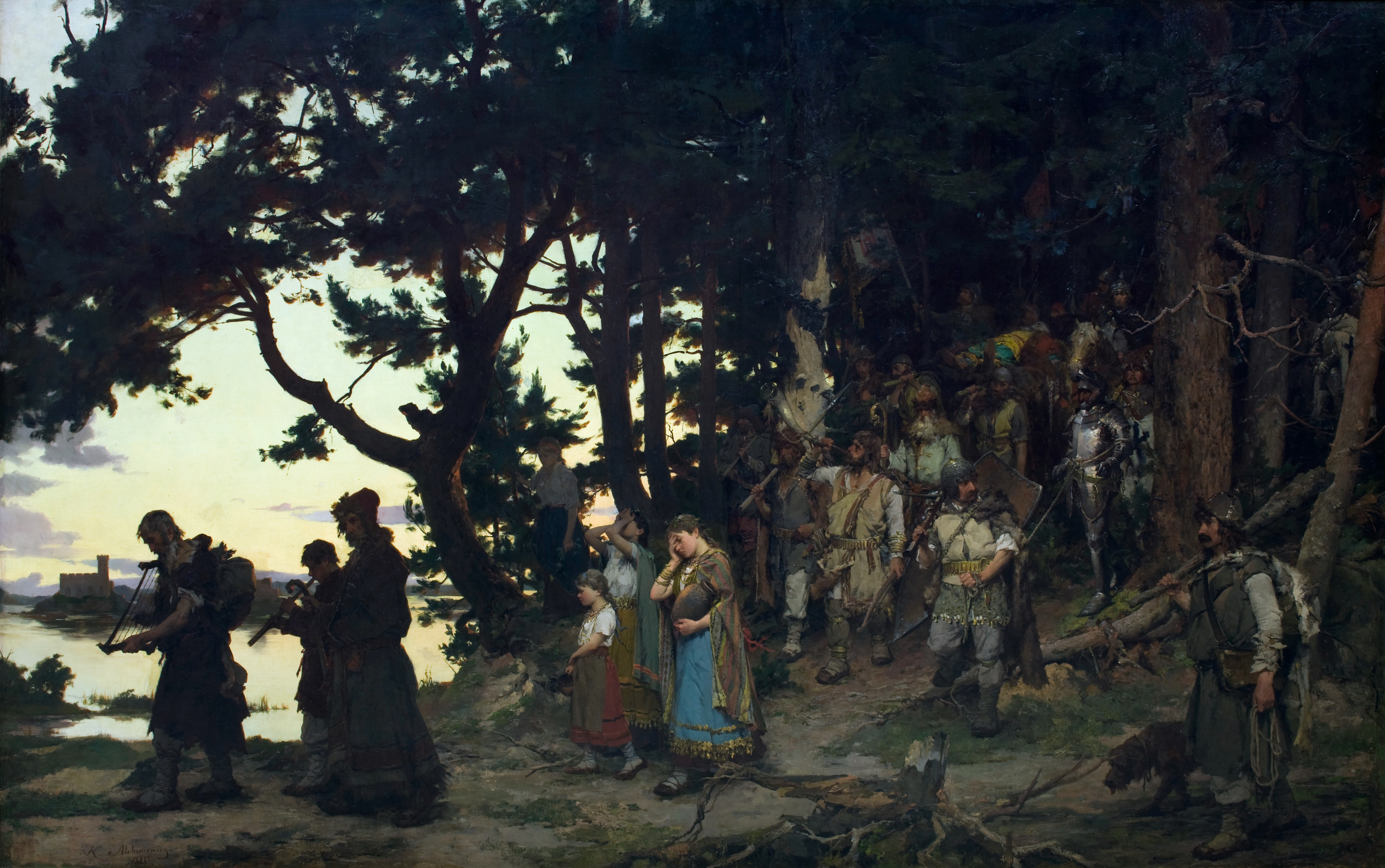
Funeral of Grand Duke of Lithuania Gediminas (1888)

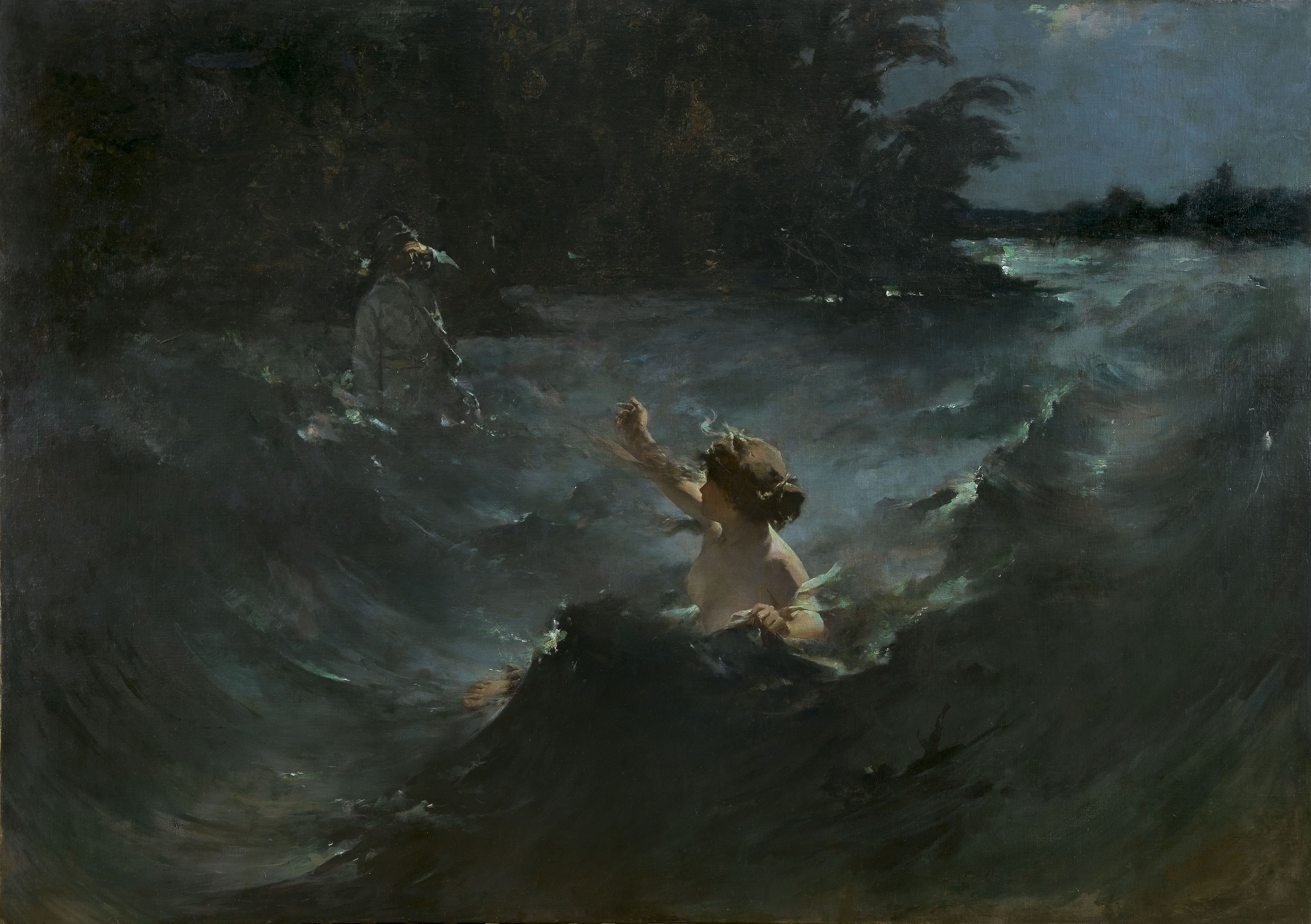
Water nymph
