= Borków, Warsaw =

Neighbourhood of Warsaw, Poland

Borków
- Neighbourhood
- Interactive map of Borków
- Coordinates: 52°11′19″N 21°10′19″E
- Country: Poland
- Voivodeship: Masovian
- City and county: Warsaw
- District: Wawer
- City Information System area: Radość
- Municipal neighbourhood: Radość
- Time zone: UTC+1 (CET)
  - Summer (DST): UTC+2 (CEST)
- Area code: +48 22

Borków (Polish: [ˈbɔr.kuf]) is a neighbourhood in Warsaw, Poland, within the district of Wawer. It is a part of the municipal neighbourhood and the City Information System area of Radość. It is a residential area of single-family housing.

== History ==
Borków was founded in the 15th century, as a small farming community.

In 1918, at the current Mrówcza Street, was opened the Borków Warszawski railway station. It was part of the Jabłonna Railroad narrow-gauge line. The station was closed in 1951.

On 14 May 1951, Borków was incorporated into the city of Warsaw.

In 2004, the district of Wawer was subdivided into the areas of the City Information System, with Borków becoming part of the area of Radość.
