= Aurimas Vertelis =

Lithuanian footballer

Personal information
- Date of birth: 6 September 1986 (age 40)
- Place of birth: Lithuanian SSR, Soviet Union
- Height: 1.75 m (5 ft 9 in)
- Position: Left winger

Senior career*
Years	Team	Apps	(Gls)
2002–2004	FK Mažeikiai	21	(13)
2005–2006	FK Vetra-2	21	(15)
- FK Alytis
- FK Mažeikiai
2009–2010	FBK Kaunas	34	(24)
2010–2013	FK Ekranas	75	(16)
2014	Botoșani	9	(0)

International career
2004–2005	Lithuania U19	6	(1)
- * Club domestic league appearances and goals as of 20 October 2014

Aurimas Vertelis (born 6 September 1986) is a Lithuanian footballer who plays as a left winger.

In January 2014, he joined FC Botoșani in the Romanian Liga I.

== Honours ==
=== Club ===
FK Ekranas

- A Lyga: 2011, 2012
- Lithuanian Football Cup: 2010–11
