= Stanisław Gudowski =

Polish Army officer

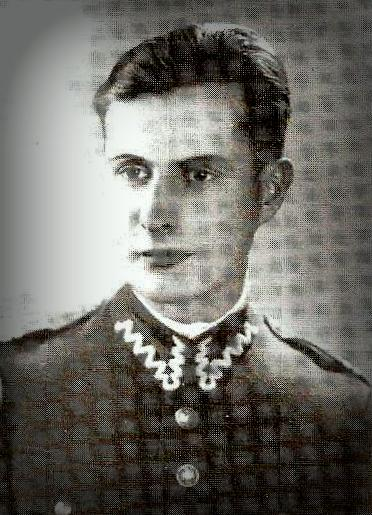
Stanisław Gudowski

Stanisław Gudowski (4 June 1918, Vilnius – 26 May 2011) was one of the tank commanders of General Maczek's 1st Armoured Division. He took part in the Normandy campaign (Operation Overlord), the Falaise-Chambois operation as well as the French, Dutch and Belgian campaigns and was awarded the Cross of Valour (Poland). In later years, he served his local community as Chairman of the Croydon branch of the Association of Polish Combatants in Great Britain. He died in London in 2011.
