= Ludwik Narbutt =

Polish noble

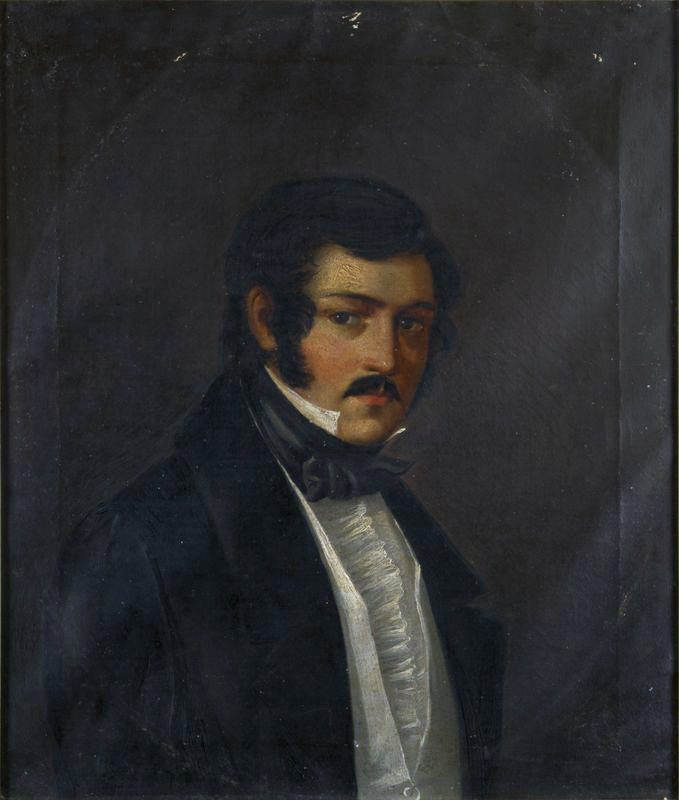
Ludwik Narbutt

Ludwik Narbutt (Lithuanian: Liudvikas Narbutas) (26 August 1832 – 5 May 1863) was a Polish-Lithuanian noble and a notable military commander during the January Uprising. Son of Teodor Narbutt, he led a large unit of Polish insurgents in the region of the town of Lida, from the start of the uprising till his death in combat on 5 May 1863.

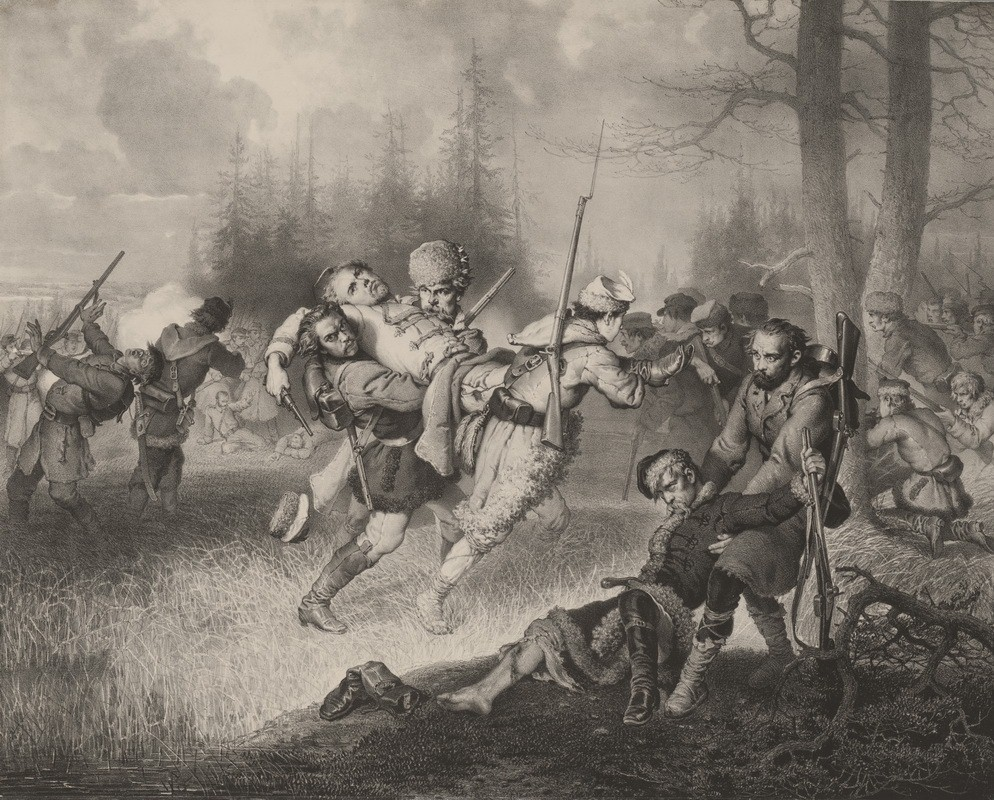
Michał Elwiro Andriolli. Death of Ludwik Narbutt in Dubichi (Russian Empire). National Museum of Lithuania.
