= Auksė Treinytė =

Lithuanian sport shooter (born 1952)

Personal information
- Full name: Auksė Treinytė
- Born: 30 July 1952 (age 73) Vilnius, Lithuanian SSR, Soviet Union

Sport
- Sport: Pistol
Medal record
Representing Soviet Union
World Championships
Gold medal – first place	1982 Caracas	Team Pistol
Gold medal – first place	1982 Caracas	Team Air Pistol
Silver medal – second place	1982 Caracas	Air Pistol
European Championships
Silver medal – second place	1982 Rome	25m Pistol
Silver medal – second place	1983 Bucharest	25m Pistol

Auksė Treinytė-Dauderienė (born 30 July 1952 in Vilnius) is a Lithuanian former sport shooter who competed for the Soviet Union. Former world record holder.
