= Aurimas Taurantas =

Lithuanian politician (born 1956)

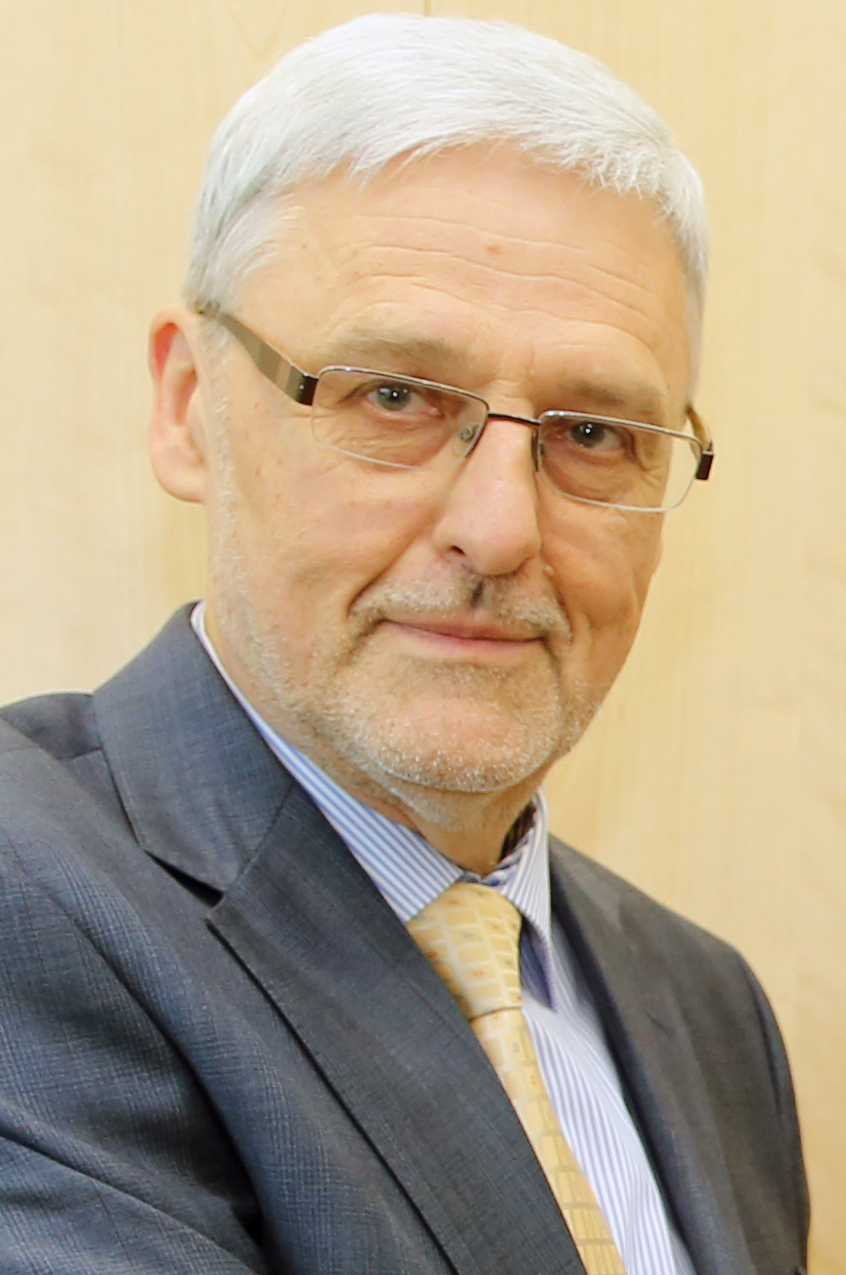
Aurimas Taurantas in 2017

Aurimas Taurantas (born 7 February 1956 in Vilnius) is a Lithuanian politician. In 1990 he was among those who signed the Act of the Re-Establishment of the State of Lithuania.

Seimas
New constituency	Member of the Seimas for Kalniečiai; 1990-1992	Succeeded by Povilas Katilius
