= Jacob Liboschütz =

Russian physician (1741–1827)

Jacob Liboschütz (1741–1827) was a Russian medical doctor.

== Biography ==
He was born in 1741.

After studying at the University of Halle he went to St. Petersburg. His religious belief, however, rendered it impossible for him to settle there, and he established himself at Vilna, where he became celebrated. When the famous physician Professor Frank was leaving Vilna and was asked in whose charge he had left the public health, he answered, "In the charge of God and the Jew" ("Deus et Judeus," meaning "God and Liboschütz"). Liboschütz was celebrated also as a diplomat and philanthropist (Fuenn, Kiryah Ne'emanah, p. 260, Vilna, 1860).

He died in Vilna on 10 February 1827.
