= Michał Elwiro Andriolli =

Polish artist (1836–1893)

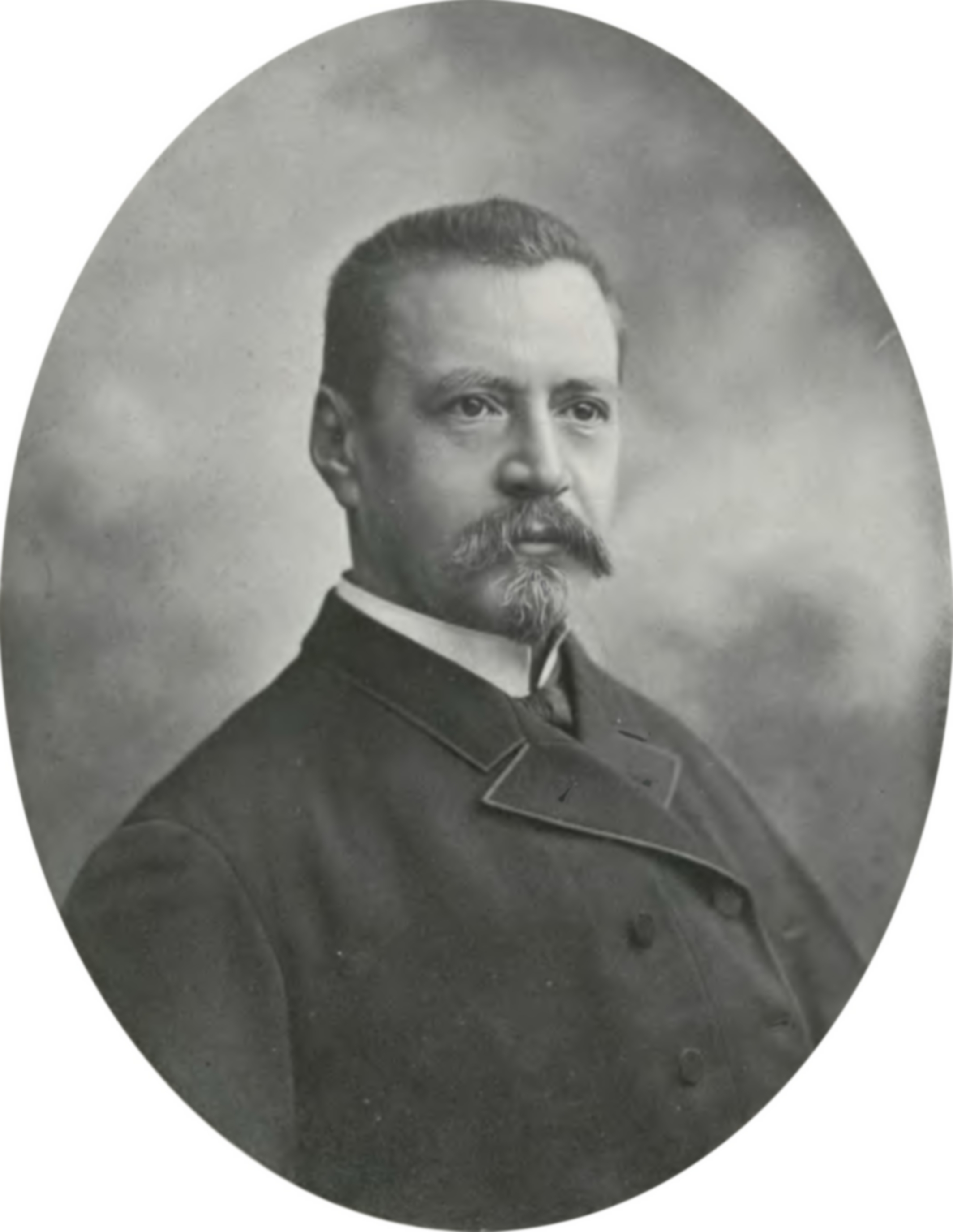
- Born: 2 November 1836; Vilna, Russian Empire (now Vilnius, Lithuania)
- Died: 23 August 1893 (aged 56); Nałęczów, Congress Poland
- Known for: Painting, drawing, architecture
- Movement: History painting

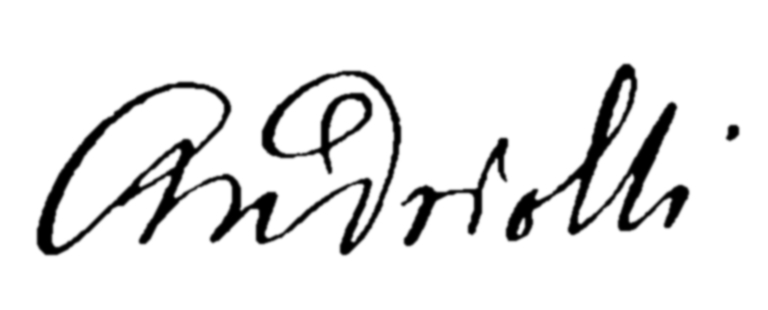
Personal signature of Andriolli

Michał Elwiro Andriolli (Lithuanian: Mykolas Elvyras Andriolis, Italian: Elviro Michele Andriolli; 2 November 1836 – 23 August 1893) was a Polish illustrator, painter and architect of Italian descent. He is notable for his illustrations to Mickiewicz's Pan Tadeusz, as well as a distinctive style of villas built outside Warsaw. He was probably most well known for his architecture – Świdermajer. This was a regional architectural style common in the Otwock, Poland region. These structures were wooden in construction and were popularized from the turn of the 19th and 20th centuries. Its creator was Michał Elwiro Andriolli. It is characterized by gazebos and decorations above the windows, some of the houses also had turrets. Pine trees were planted together with the buildings as part of the composition.

== Life ==
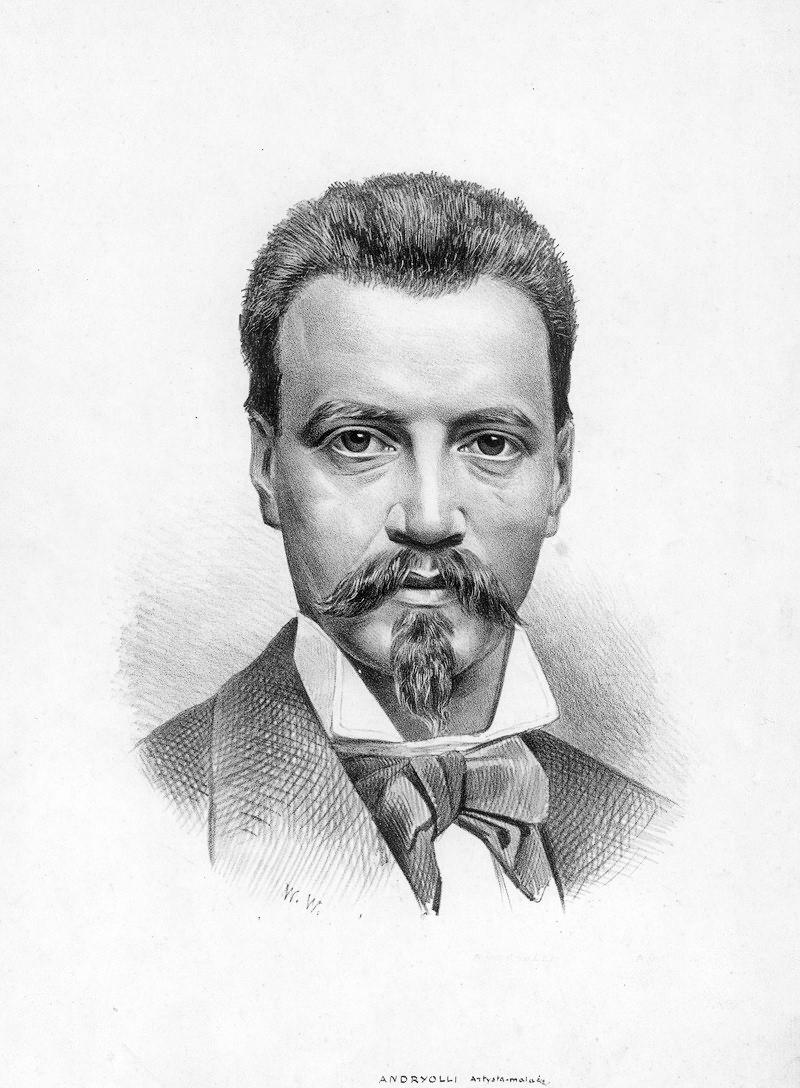
Portrait of Michał Elwiro Andriolli by Władysław Walkiewicz, lithograph, 19th century, National Museum of Lithuania

Andriolli was born on 2 November 1836 in Vilnius, then under the Russian Empire's rule. He was the son of Francesco Andriolli, an Italian veteran of the Napoleon Bonaparte's Grande Armée, and a Polish noblewoman Petronella Gośniewska de Nowina. His first given name was to honour his maternal grandfather, Michał Gośniewski. In 1855, Androlli went to Moscow, where he started his studies at the School of Painting and Sculpture. In 1858 he graduated from the Imperial Academy of Art in Petersburg. Andriolli received a scholarship and in 1861 he went to Rome, where he continued his studies at the Accademia di San Luca. He returned to Vilnius and took part in the January Uprising against Russian rule. Arrested by the tsarist authorities, he managed to escape from Kaunas Prison and reach London and then Paris.

An emissary of the Committee of Polish Emigration, he returned to Russian-held Poland, but was again arrested in 1866. Tried for his part in the Uprising, he was deported to Vyatka. Pardoned in 1871, Andriolli returned to Poland and settled in Warsaw. There he started his career as an illustrator for various newspapers, notably the Tygodnik Illustrowany, Kłosy and Biesiada Literacka. His work for various Warsaw-based newspapers made him one of the most renown illustration makers of the time and Andriolli was hired to illustrate some of the classic works of Polish literature, notably the works by Adam Mickiewicz, Juliusz Słowacki and Józef Ignacy Kraszewski. His pictures for the first editions of Mickiewicz's Pan Tadeusz and Konrad Wallenrod, prepared between 1879 and 1882, are regarded as icons of Polish literature even now.

In March 1883, Andriolli visited Paris where he was guest in the home of Władysław Mickiewicz the eldest son of Adam Mickiewicz. Between 1883 and 1886, he lived in Paris, where he worked on illustrating the French language editions of works by William Shakespeare and James Fenimore Cooper. Upon his return he also worked on frescoes in several churches, notably in Kaunas.

In the later years of his life, Andriolli found refuge in a small villa he designed for himself near Anielin in what is now the town of Otwock at the Świder River, close to Warsaw. Apart from his own house, he designed several other villas in the area, creating a distinctive architectural style of Warsaw's suburbs. The świdermajer, as it was later dubbed by Konstanty Ildefons Gałczyński, was an eclectic mixture of traditional Mazovian village wooden architecture with Alpine and Siberian styles. It remains a distinctive feature of many of Warsaw's suburbs. Michał Andriolli died on 23 August 1893 in Nałęczów and is buried at the local cemetery.

== Works ==
Michał Andriolli illustrated many books by Polish authors, including:

- Eliza Orzeszkowa – "Meir Ezofowicz",
- Adam Mickiewicz – Pan Tadeusz,
- Józef Ignacy Kraszewski – Stara Baśń in 1879,
- Antoni Malczewski – "Marya" in 1876,
- Władysław Mickiewicz – "Les Récits d'un vieux gentilhomme polonais" 1866,

== Gallery ==
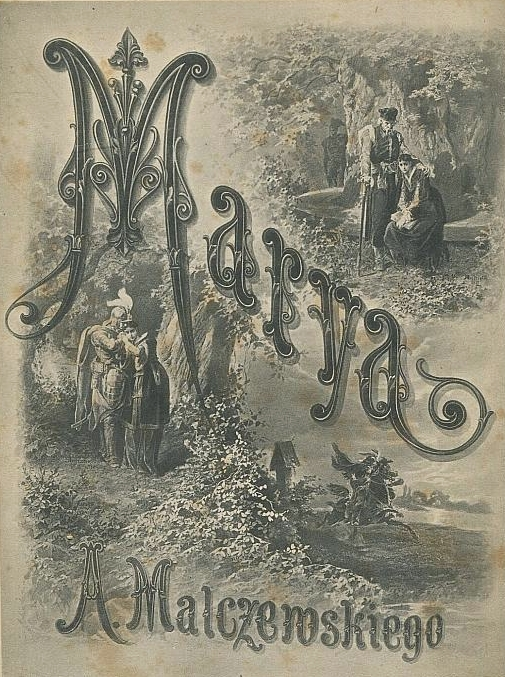
Cover of Antoni Malczewski's book Marya, 1876

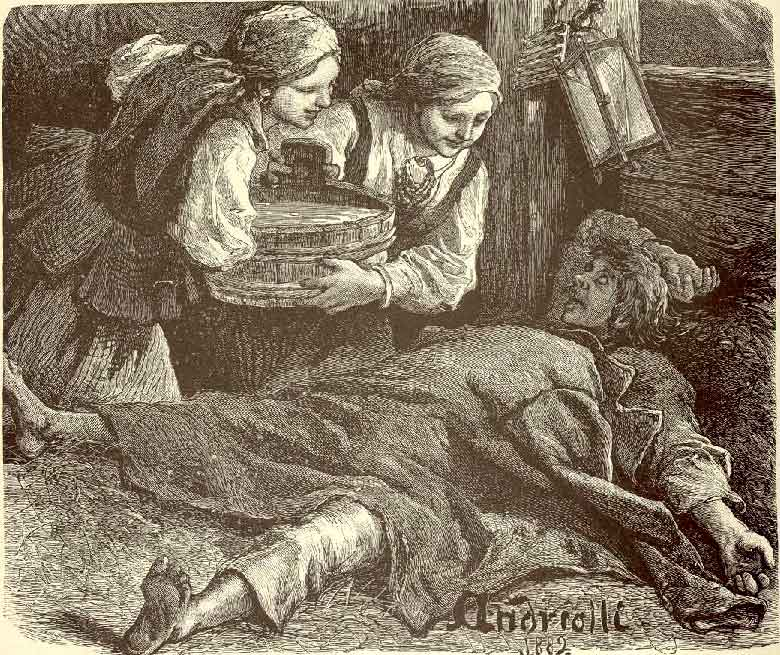
"Śmigus-dyngus"

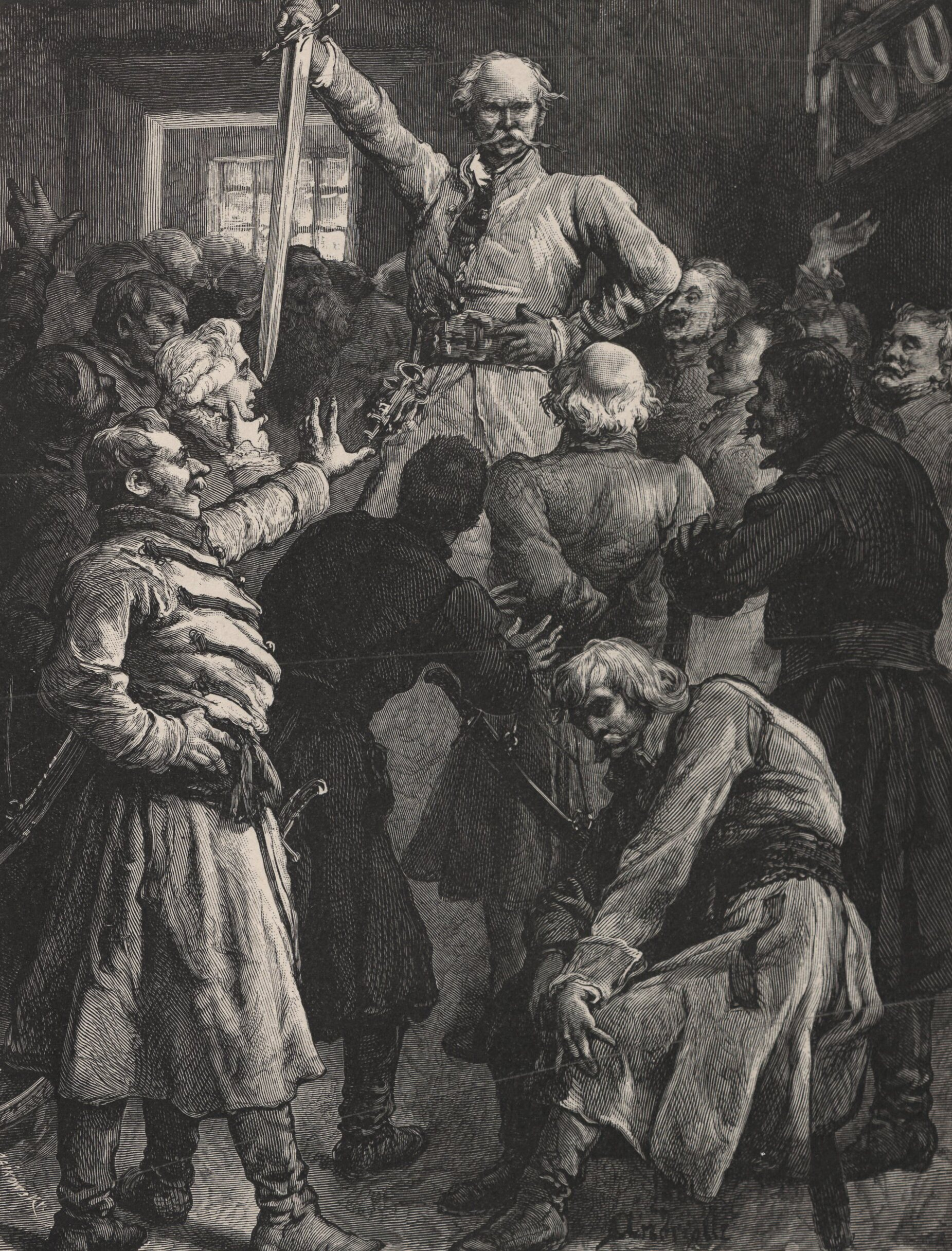
Illustration to Pan Tadeusz

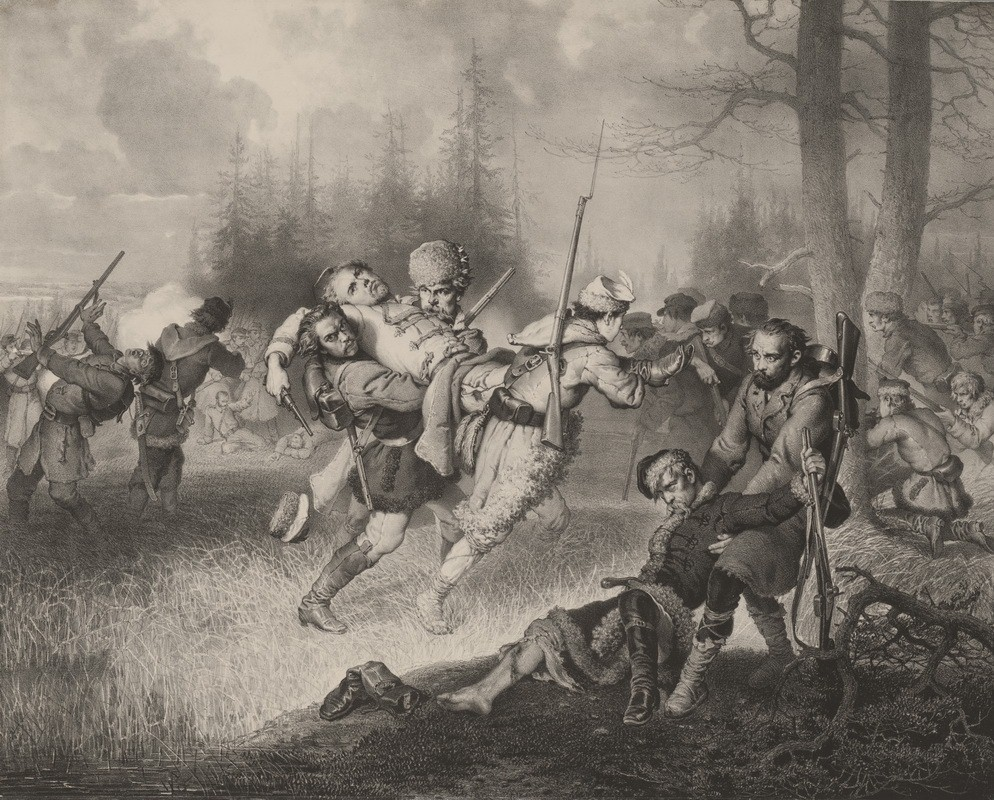
Death of Ludwik Narbutt in Dubičiai, Lithuania. National Museum of Lithuania

== See also ==
- List of Poles
