= Audrius Rubežius =

Lithuanian opera singer (born 1966)

Audrius Rubežius (born 29 June 1966) is a Lithuanian tenor working with the Lithuanian National Opera and Ballet Theatre. He studied at Stasys Šimkus Conservatory in Klaipėda and Lithuanian Academy of Music in Vilnius. In 1996, he won the Beatričė Grincevičiūtė and Kazimieras Banaitis vocalists' contests. For performance of Belmonte's role in Mozart's Die Entführung aus dem Serail Rubežius received Kristoforas award from the Lithuanian Theatre and Cinema Association.
