= Kalniečiai =

Coordinates: 54°55′34″N 23°57′23″E

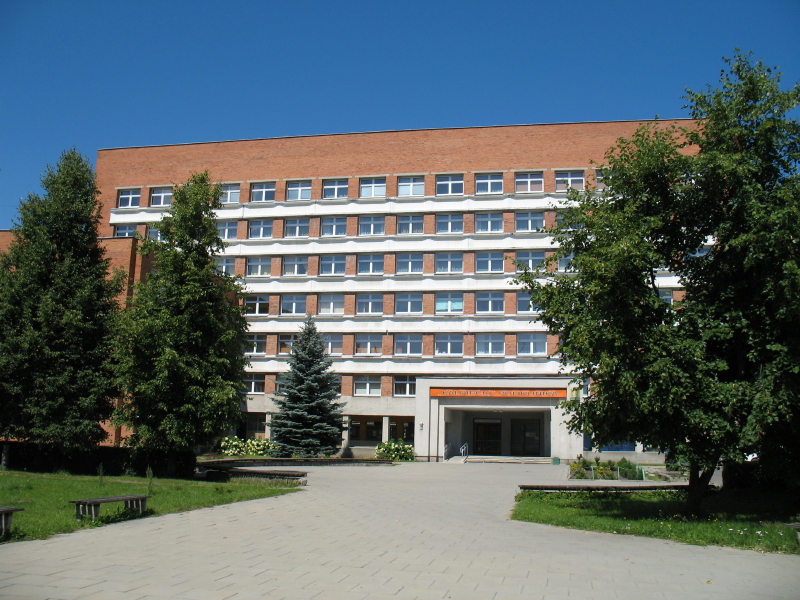
Polyclinic

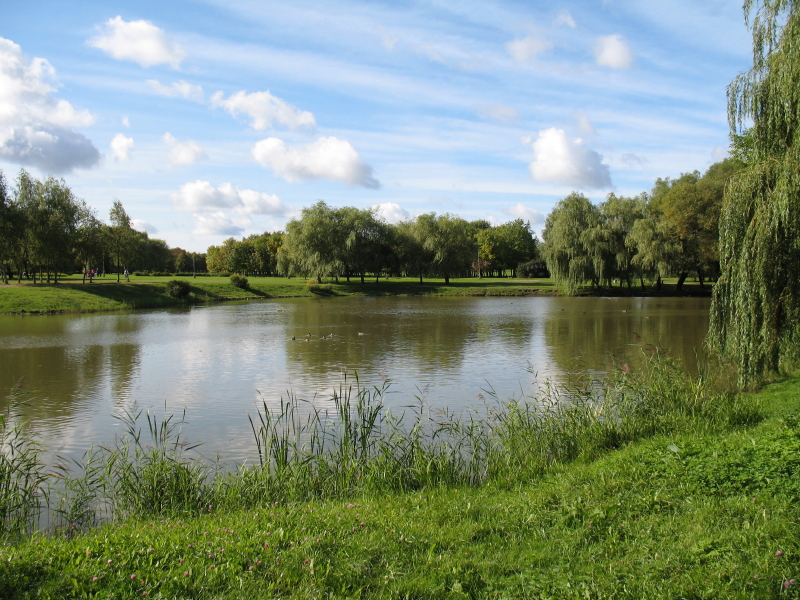
Kalniečiai Park

Kalniečiai is a neighborhood of the Lithuanian city of Kaunas. In 2005, its population was 12,000 in an area of 78,39 ha. In Kalniečiai is a Kaunas VDU Rasos Gymnasium with 110 employees and Polyclinic (VšĮ Kauno Kalniečių Poliklinika) with 415 employees (19/03/2013).

== Literature ==
- Kalniečiai. Visuotinė lietuvių enciklopedija, T. IX (Juocevičius-Khiva). – Vilnius: Mokslo ir enciklopedijų leidybos institutas, 2006. 222 psl.
