= Audrius Dzikaras =

Lithuanian painter

Audrius Dzikaras (born August 14, 1957, in Vilnius) is a Lithuanian painter. He paints in oil, mostly landscapes (Path in 1983, Bridge in 1985, First Snow in 1986, the Dark Landscape in 1988, Temple in 1999 etc.). He paints metaphysically as a means of expression and his works often use dark colors.
