= Świder =

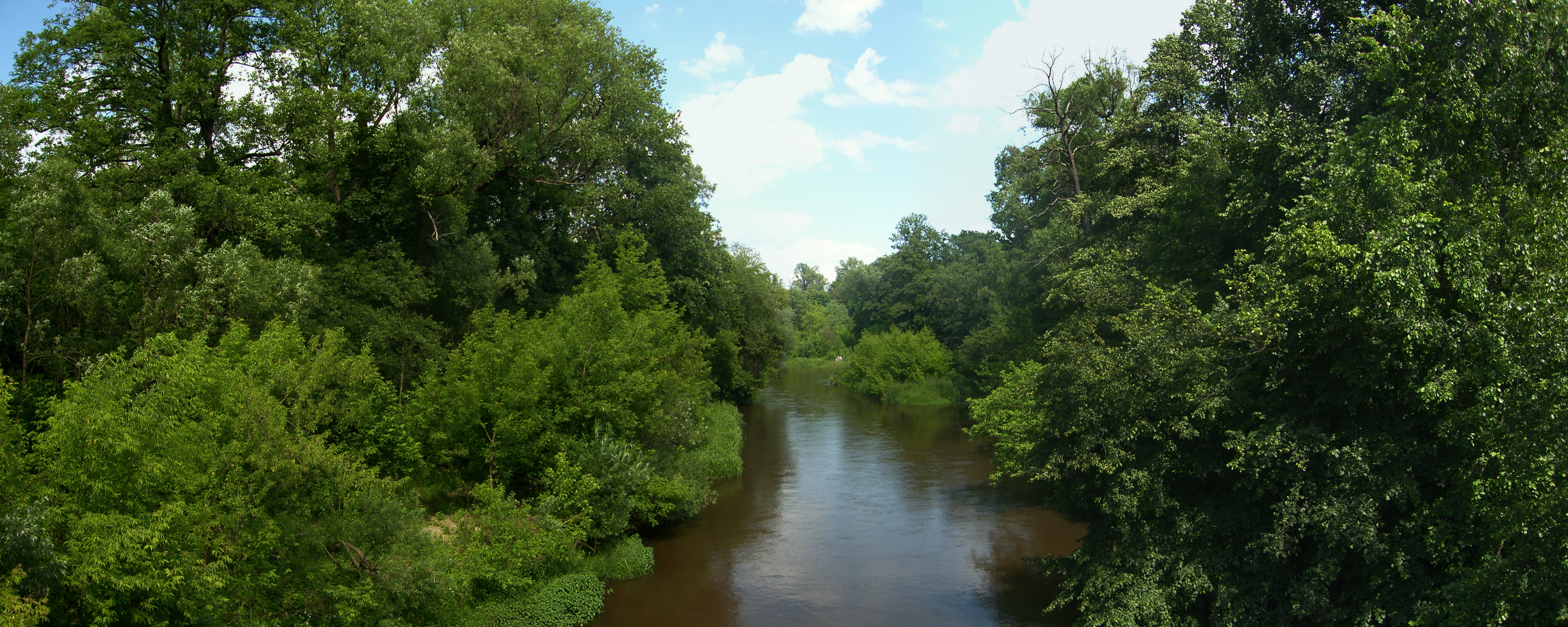
- Świder River in Otwock

Location
- Country: Poland

Physical characteristics
- Mouth
  - location: Vistula
  - coordinates: 52°05′59″N 21°12′53″E

Basin features
- Progression: Vistula→ Baltic Sea

The Świder is a river in Masovia, Poland. It is a tributary to the Vistula near Otwock.
