= Sanna River =

Sanna can refer to the rivers

- Sanna (Inn), a river in Austria, a tributary to the Inn
- Sanna (Vistula), a river in Poland, a tributary to the Vistula
