= Przekop Wisły =

Canal in the Vistula Delta

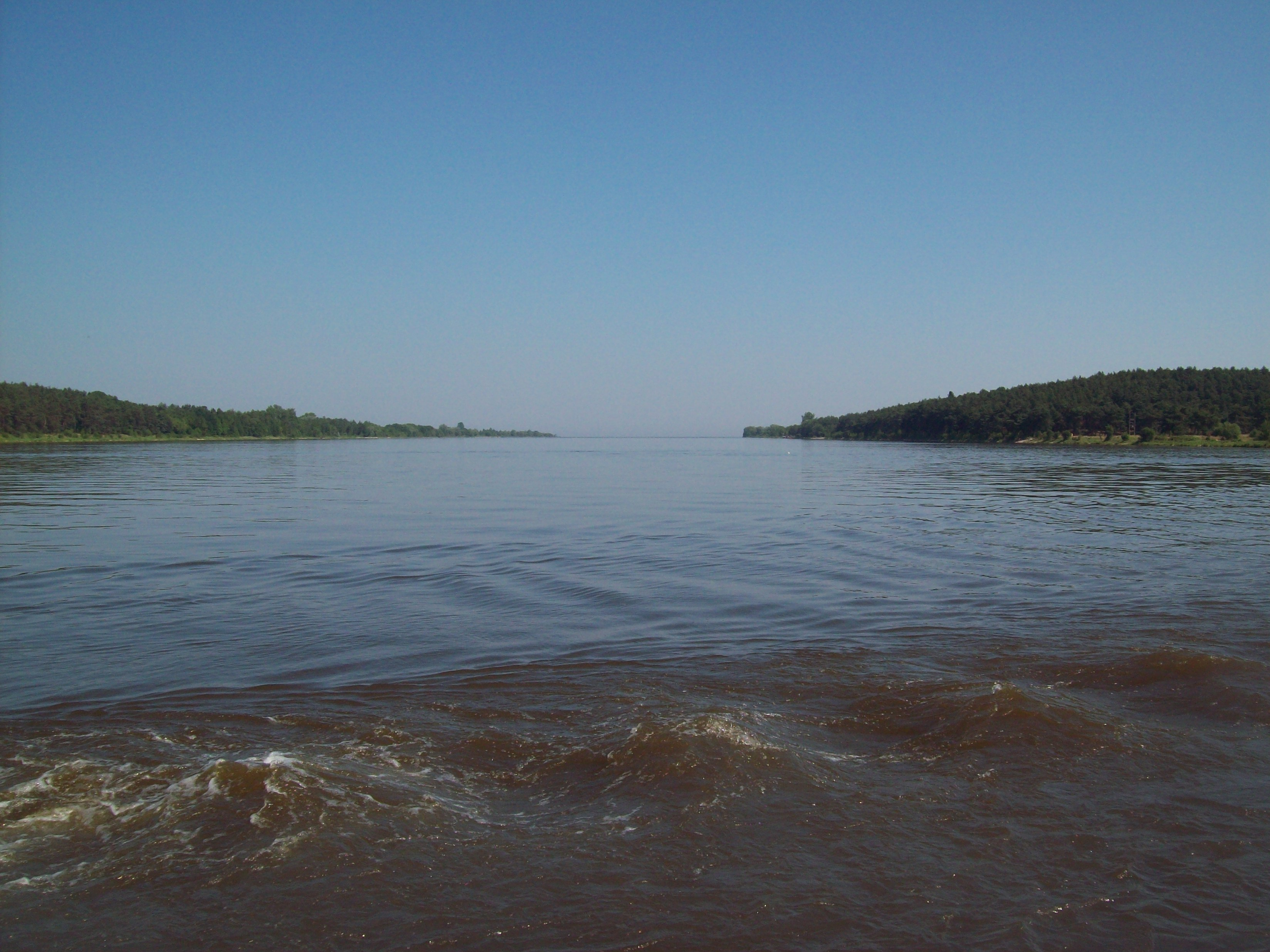
- A view of the Przekop towards its mouth

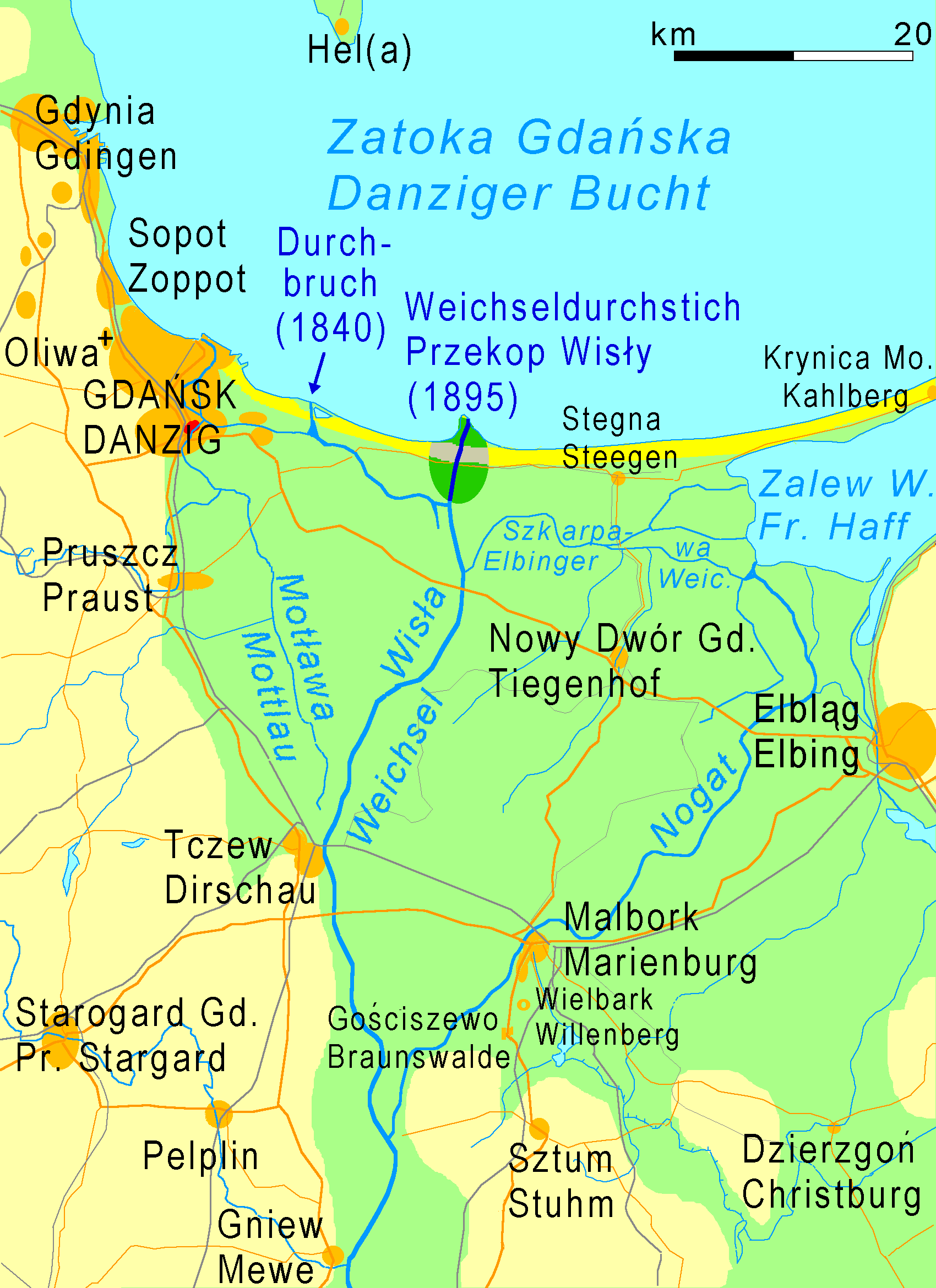

- Location within Pomeranian Voivodeship
- Interactive map of Przekop Wisły
- Location: Between Sobieszewo Island and Gmina Stegna, Pomeranian Voivodeship
- Country: Poland

Specifications
- Length: 7.1 km (4.4 miles)

History
- Former names: Weichseldurchstich
- Modern name: Przekop Wisły
- Construction began: June 1891
- Date completed: March 1895

Geography
- Start point: Mikoszewo or Świbno
- End point: Gdańsk Bay
- Beginning coordinates: 54.3085°N 18.9342°E
- Ending coordinates: 54.3606°N 18.9501°E

The Przekop Wisły (Polish pronunciation: [ˈpʂɛkɔp], often shortened to just Przekop) is a branch of the Vistula river in its delta. It was created artificially in 1895 (hence its Polish name "Przekop" in this case meaning "river cutoff"). Since then, it has formed the most direct route from the Vistula to the Baltic Sea.

== History ==
Work on the Przekop began in June 1891. 1,000 workers and 40 steam machines were dedicated to the project. 7,000,000 cubic metres (250,000,000 cu ft) of dirt was displaced from the construction site. 20 million marks were spent on the project in total. An opening ceremony was not held once the canal was finished—at 3:45 p.m. on 31 March 1895, president of East Prussia Gustav von Goßler was sent a telegraph signal by Wilhelm II, German Emperor, to open the canal. He followed the Emperor's orders and opened it by himself.

== Measurements ==
The Przekop is 7.1 kilometres (4.4 mi) long and 250 to 400 metres (820 to 1,310 ft) wide, with shallows measuring 1 metre (3.3 ft) in depth. In June 2022, the water levels of the Przekop reached 526 centimetres (207 in).

== Geology ==
The deposition of the sediments on the canal's surface is progressing at a fast pace and its surface is mostly made up of coarse sands with leptokurtic distribution.
