= Skrwa =

Skrwa may refer to:

- Skrwa Lewa, a river in Poland, left tributary of the Vistula
- Skrwa Prawa, a river in Poland, right tributary of the Vistula
