= Wilga (Garwolin) =

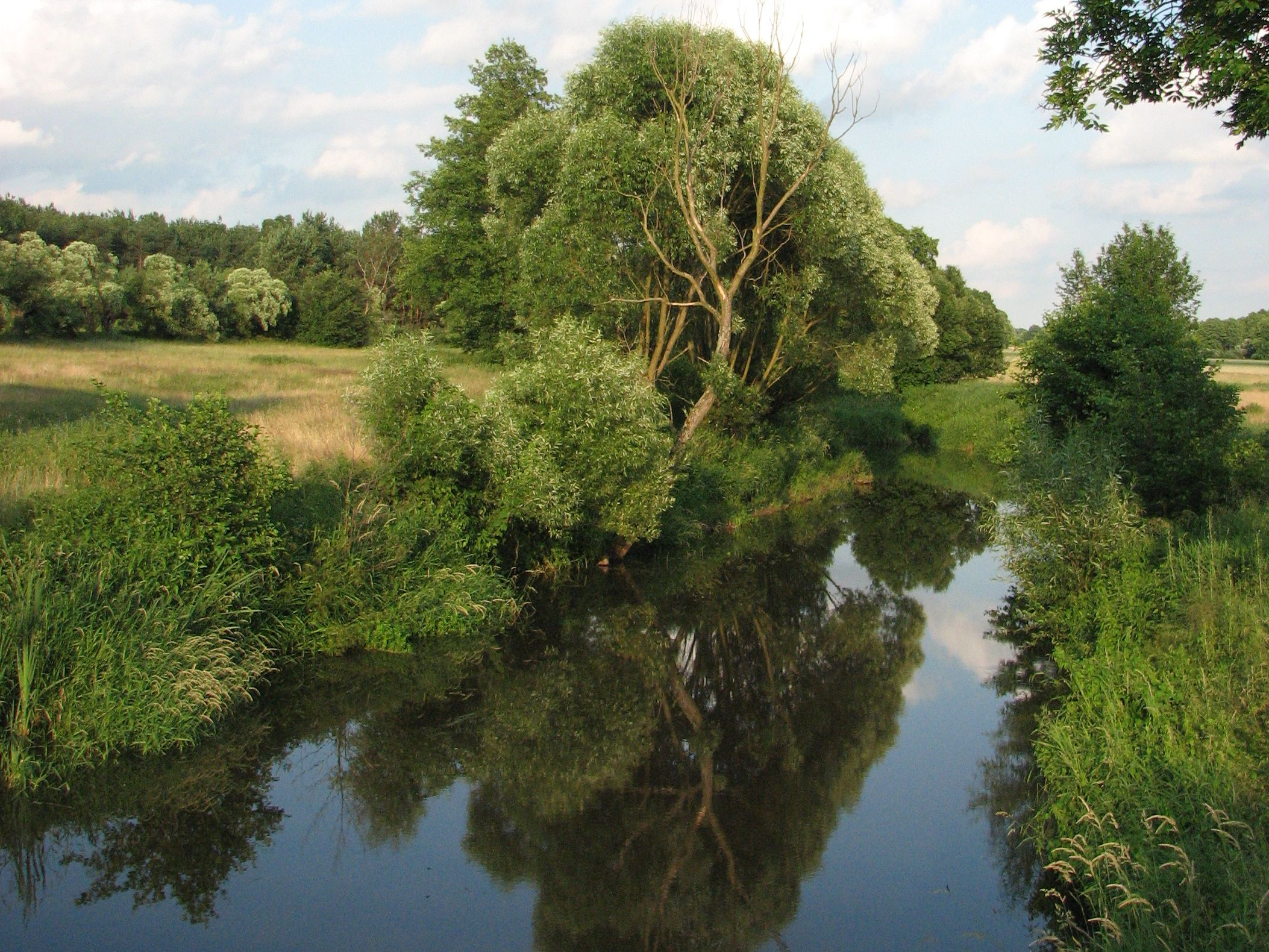

Location
- Country: Poland

Physical characteristics
- Mouth
  - location: Vistula
  - coordinates: 51°50′14″N 21°21′22″E

Basin features
- Progression: Vistula→ Baltic Sea

The Wilga is a river in eastern Poland south of Warsaw and lies in Garwolin County. The 67 kilometre long Wilga is a tributary of Vistula River.
