= Mikoszewo =

- Village
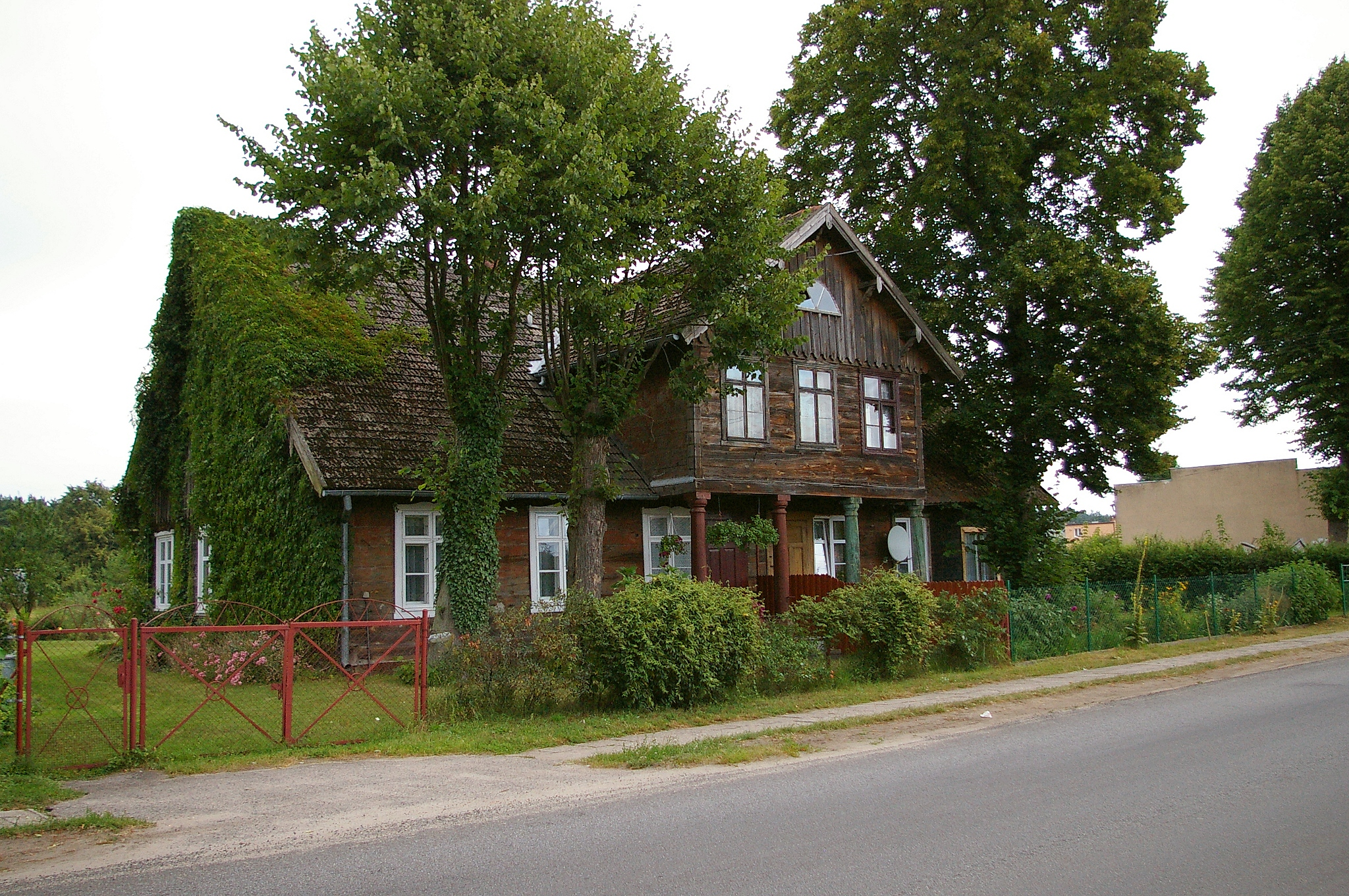
- A house in Mikoszewo

- Location within Poland
- Coordinates: 54°20′2″N 18°57′10″E
- Country: Poland
- Voivodeship: Pomeranian
- County: Nowy Dwór
- Gmina: Stegna
- Elevation: 3 m (9.8 ft)
- Population: 710
- Time zone: UTC+1 (CET)
  - Summer (DST): UTC+2 (CEST)
- Vehicle registration: GND

Mikoszewo [mikɔˈʂɛvɔ] (German: Nickelswalde) is a village in the Gmina Stegna district of the Nowy Dwór County, in the Pomeranian Voivodeship of northern Poland. Mikoszewo is where the longest Polish river, Vistula, empties into the Baltic Sea. It is located within the historic region of Pomerania.

== History ==
The village was part of the Kingdom of Poland, within which it was a possession of the city of Gdańsk (formerly Danzig), located in the Pomeranian Voivodeship, until the Second Partition of Poland in 1793, when it was annexed by Kingdom of Prussia. In 1871 it became part of newly united Germany. Following the German defeat in World War I, it was part of the Free City of Danzig from 1920 to 1939. During World War II, it was part of Nazi Germany. During the war, it was the location of a sub-camp of the Stutthof concentration camp, in which the Germans imprisoned 120 Norwegians as forced labor. Following Germany's defeat in World War II, under border changes promulgated at the Potsdam Conference of July–August 1945, the area became part of Poland.
