= Skrwa Lewa =

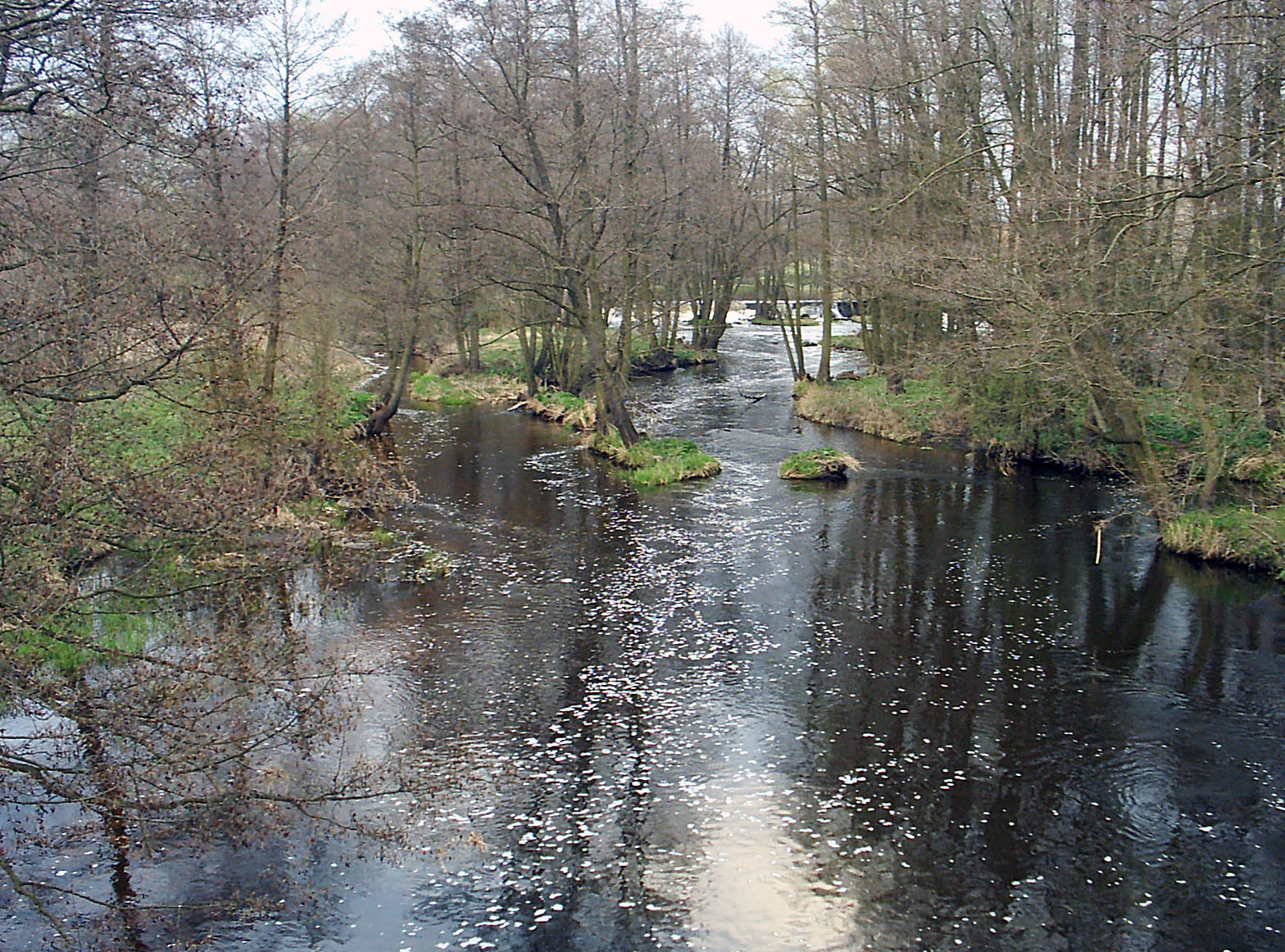

Location
- Country: Poland

Physical characteristics
- Source
  - location: south of Łanięta, Łódź Voivodeship
  - coordinates: 52°20′53″N 19°17′29″E
- Mouth: Vistula
  - location: east of Soczewka, Masovian Voivodeship
  - coordinates: 52°32′53″N 19°34′33″E
  - elevation: 56.9 m (187 ft)
- Length: 45.2 km (28.1 mi)

Basin features
- Progression: Vistula→ Baltic Sea

The Skrwa Lewa (Left Skrwa; in Polish also Skrwa Lewobrzeżna or Skrwa Południowa) is a river of Poland, and a left tributary of the Vistula. It flows through the Gostynin-Włocławek Landscape Park. From the town of Gostynin to its mouth, the Skrwa Lewa is a kayaking area.

Its counterpart, the Skrwa Prawa (Right Skrwa), joins the Vistula about three miles downstream on the opposite bank.
