= Sanna (Vistula) =

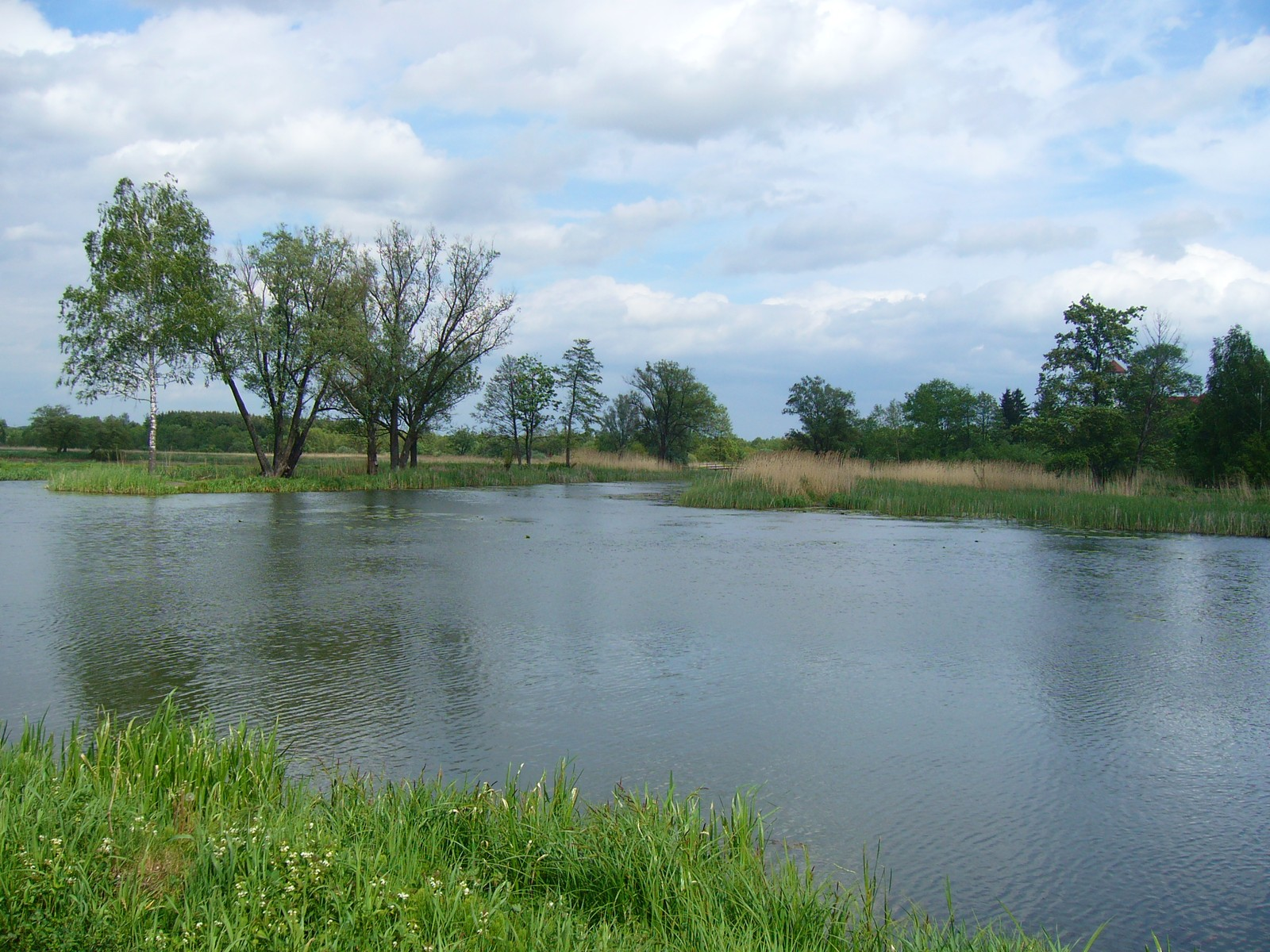

Location
- Country: Poland

Physical characteristics
- Mouth
  - location: Vistula
  - coordinates: 50.8678°N 21.8506°E

Basin features
- Progression: Vistula→ Baltic Sea

The Sanna is a tributary of Vistula River in Poland. Its source is in the village of Wierzchowiska II in Lublin Voivodeship, Galicia. The 50 km long Sanna flows westward through a rural area. Then, it turns northward for a few kilometers until flowing into the Vistula near the city of Annopol.
