= Vistula =

Major river in Central Europe

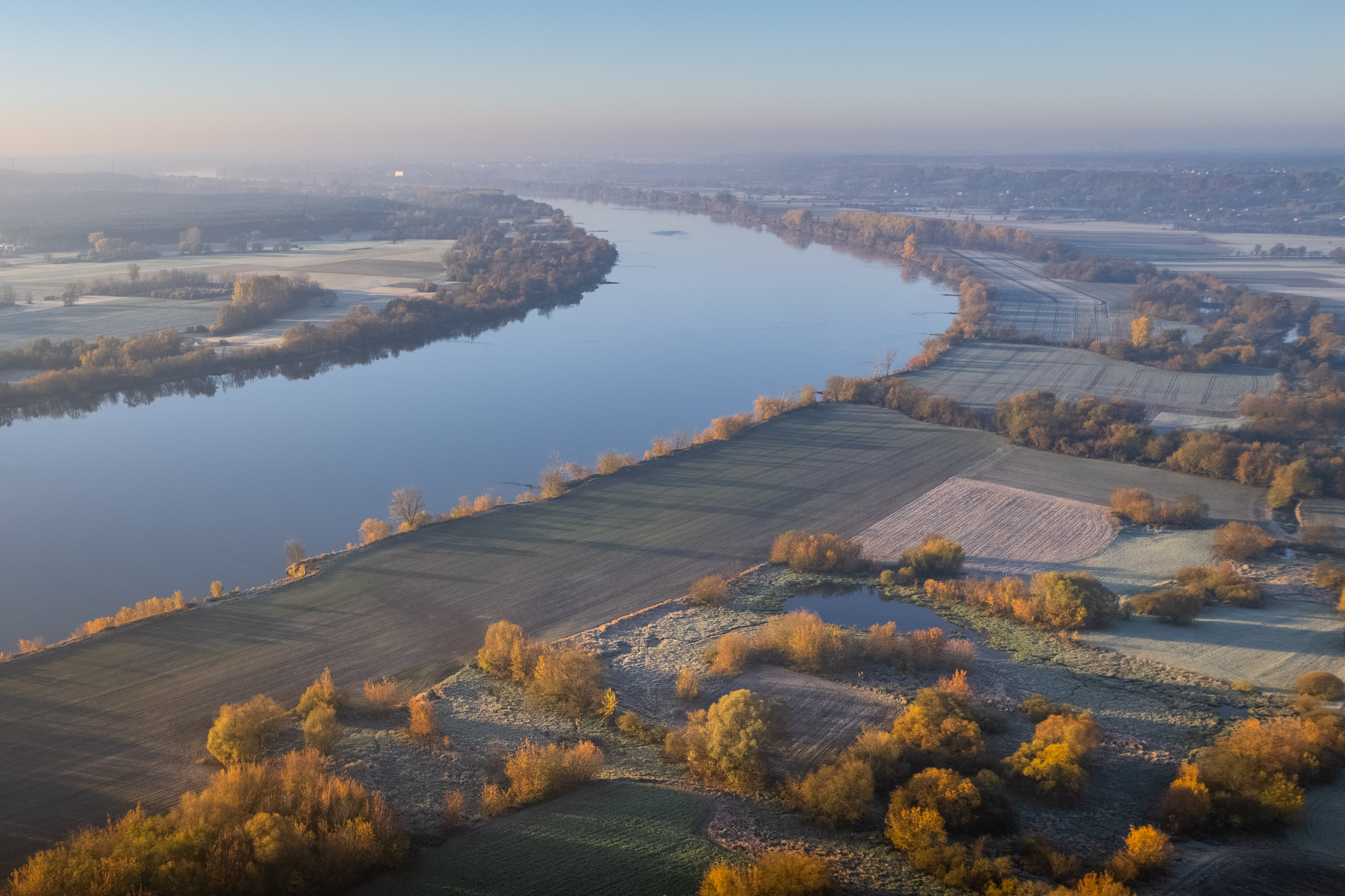
- Vistula in the Polish region of Kuyavia and southern Pomerania

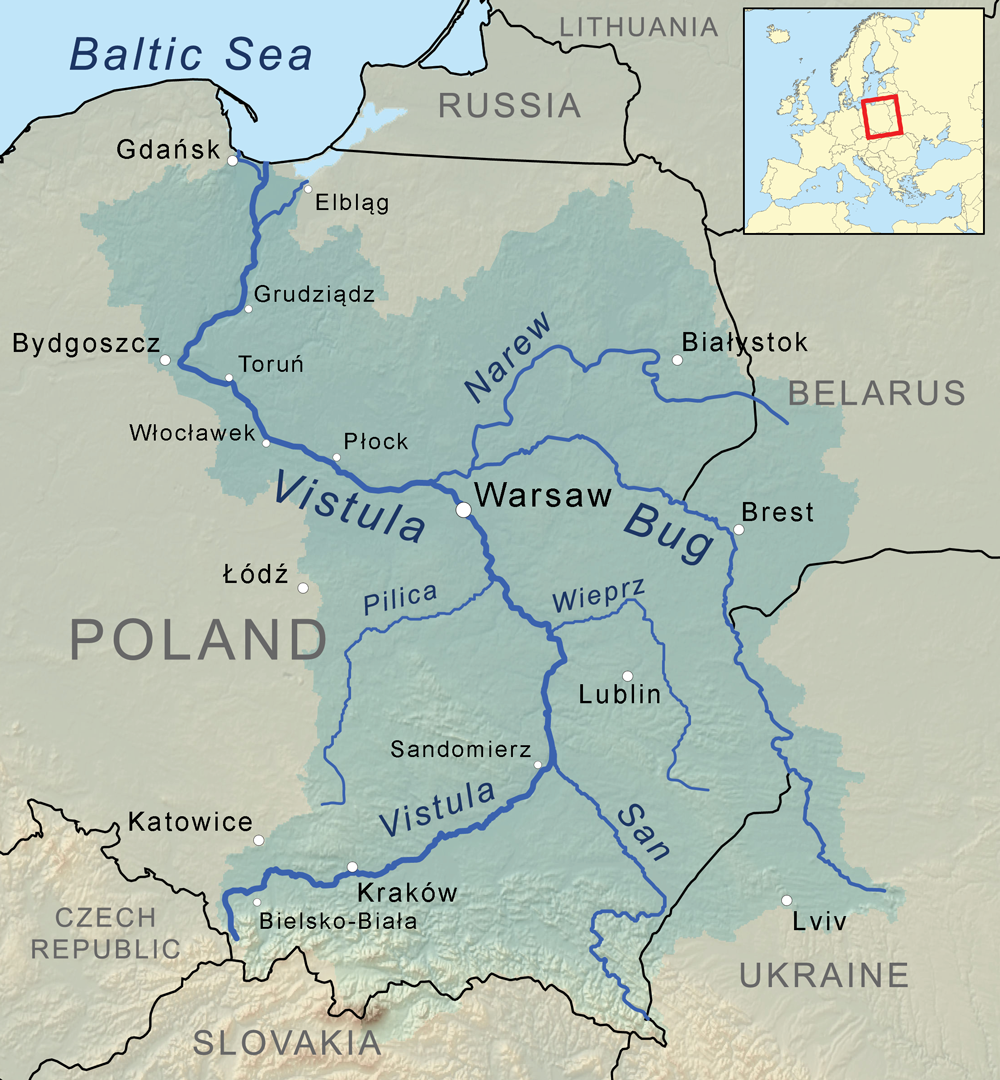
- Vistula River drainage basin in Poland, Belarus, Ukraine, and Slovakia
- Native name: Wisła (Polish)

Location
- Country: Poland
- Towns/Cities: Wisła, Oświęcim, Kraków, Sandomierz, Warsaw, Płock, Włocławek, Toruń, Bydgoszcz, Grudziądz, Tczew, Gdańsk

Physical characteristics
- Source
  - location: Barania Góra, Silesian Beskids
  - coordinates: 49°36′21″N 19°00′13″E
  - elevation: 1,106 m (3,629 ft)
- Mouth
  - location: Mikoszewo, Gdańsk Bay, Baltic Sea, Przekop channel near Świbno, Poland
  - coordinates: 54°21′42″N 18°57′07″E
  - elevation: 0 m (0 ft)
- Length: 1,047 km (651 mi)
- Basin size: 193,960 km^{2} (74,890 sq mi)
- Discharge
  - location: Gdańsk Bay, Baltic Sea, Mikoszewo
  - average: 1,080 m^{3}/s (38,000 cu ft/s)

Basin features
- Tributaries
  - left: Nida, Pilica, Bzura, Brda, Wda
  - right: Dunajec, Wisłoka, San, Wieprz, Narew, Drwęca

The Vistula (/ˈvɪstjʊlə/; Polish: Wisła [ˈviswa]) is the longest river in Poland and the longest river draining into the Baltic Sea, at 1,047 kilometres (651 miles) in length. Its drainage basin, extending into three other countries apart from Poland, covers 193,960 km^{2} (74,890 sq mi), of which 168,868 km^{2} (65,200 sq mi) is in Poland.

The Vistula rises at Barania Góra in the south of Poland, 1,220 meters (4,000 ft) above sea level in the Silesian Beskids (western part of Carpathian Mountains), where it begins with the White Little Vistula (Biała Wisełka) and the Black Little Vistula (Czarna Wisełka). It flows through Poland's largest cities, including Kraków, Sandomierz, Warsaw, Płock, Włocławek, Toruń, Bydgoszcz, Świecie, Grudziądz, Tczew and Gdańsk. It empties into the Vistula Lagoon (Zalew Wiślany) or directly into the Gdańsk Bay of the Baltic Sea with a delta of six main branches (Leniwka, Przekop, Śmiała Wisła, Martwa Wisła, Nogat and Szkarpawa).

The river has many associations with Polish culture, history and national identity. It is Poland's most important waterway and natural symbol, flowing through its two main cities (Kraków and Warsaw), and the phrase "Land on the Vistula" (Polish: kraj nad Wisłą) can be synonymous with Poland. Historically, the river was also important for the Baltic and German (Prussian) peoples.

The Vistula has given its name to the last glacial period that occurred in northern Europe, approximately between 100,000 and 10,000 BC, the Weichselian glaciation.

== Etymology ==
The name Vistula first appears in the written record of Pomponius Mela (3.33) in AD 40. Pliny in AD 77 in his Natural History names the river Vistla (4.81, 4.97, 4.100). The root of the name Vistula is often thought to come from Proto-Indo-European *weys-: 'to ooze, flow slowly' (cf. Sanskrit अवेषन् avēṣan "they flowed", Old Norse veisa "slime"), and similar elements appear in many European river-names (e.g. Svislach (Berezina), Svislach (Neman), Weser, Viešinta).

In writing about the river and its peoples, Ptolemy uses Greek spelling: Ouistoula. Other ancient sources spell the name Istula. Ammianus Marcellinus referred to the Bisula (Book 22) in the 380s. In the sixth century Jordanes (Getica 5 & 17) used Viscla.

The Anglo-Saxon poem Widsith refers to the Wistla. The 12th-century Polish chronicler Wincenty Kadłubek Latinised the river's name as Vandalus, a form presumably influenced by Lithuanian vanduõ 'water'. Jan Długosz (1415–1480) in his Annales seu cronicae incliti regni Poloniae contextually points to the river, stating "of the eastern nations, of the Polish east, from the brightness of the water the White Water...so named" (Alba aqua), perhaps referring to the White Little Vistula (Biała Wisełka).

In the course of history the river has borne similar names in different languages: German: Weichsel; Low German: Wießel; Dutch: Wijsel [ˈʋɛisəl]; Yiddish: ווײַסל, romanized: Vaysl (Polish Yiddish: [ˈvaːsɫ̩], Standard: [ˈvajsl̩]); and Russian: Висла, romanized: Visla.

== Sources ==
The Vistula rises in the southern Silesian Voivodeship close to the tripoint involving the Czech Republic and Slovakia from two sources: Czarna ("Black") Wisełka at altitude 1,107 m (3,632 ft) and Biała ("White") Wisełka at altitude 1,080 m (3,540 ft). Both are on the western slope of Barania Góra in the Silesian Beskids in Poland.

== Geography ==
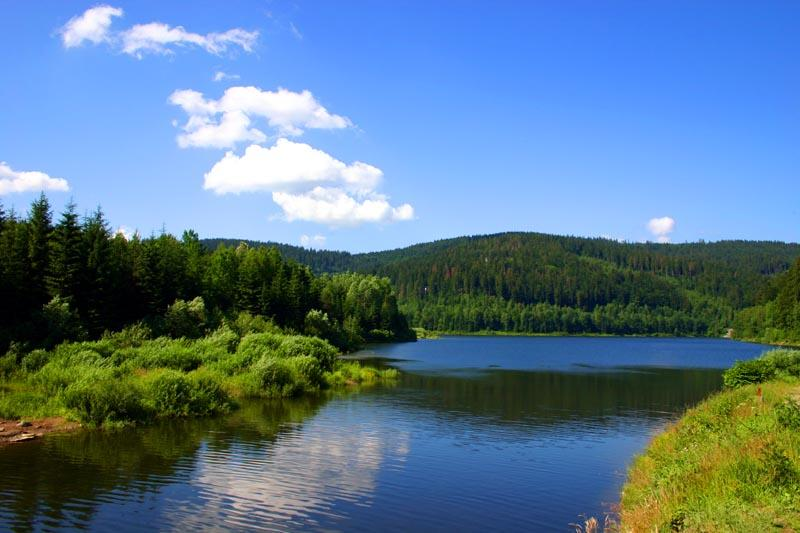
Vistula in southern Poland with the Silesian Beskids

The Vistula can be divided into three parts: upper, from its sources to Sandomierz; central, from Sandomierz to the confluences with the Narew river and the Bug river; and bottom, from the confluence with Narew to the sea.

The Vistula river basin covers 194,424 square kilometres (75,068 square miles) (in Poland 168,700 square kilometres (65,135 square miles)); its average altitude is 270 metres (886 feet) above sea level. In addition, the majority of its river basin (55%) is 100 to 200 m above sea level; over 3/4 of the river basin ranges from 100 to 300 metres (328 to 984 feet) in altitude. The highest point of the river basin is at 2,655 metres (8,711 feet) (Gerlach Peak in the Tatra Mountains). One of the features of the river basin of the Vistula is its asymmetry—in great measure resulting from the tilting direction of the Central European Lowland toward the northwest, the direction of the flow of glacial waters, and considerable predisposition of its older base. The asymmetry of the river basin (right-hand to left-hand side) is 73–27%.

The most recent glaciation of the Pleistocene epoch, which ended around 10,000 BC, is called the Vistulian glaciation or Weichselian glaciation in regard to north-central Europe.

== Major cities ==
Vistula River

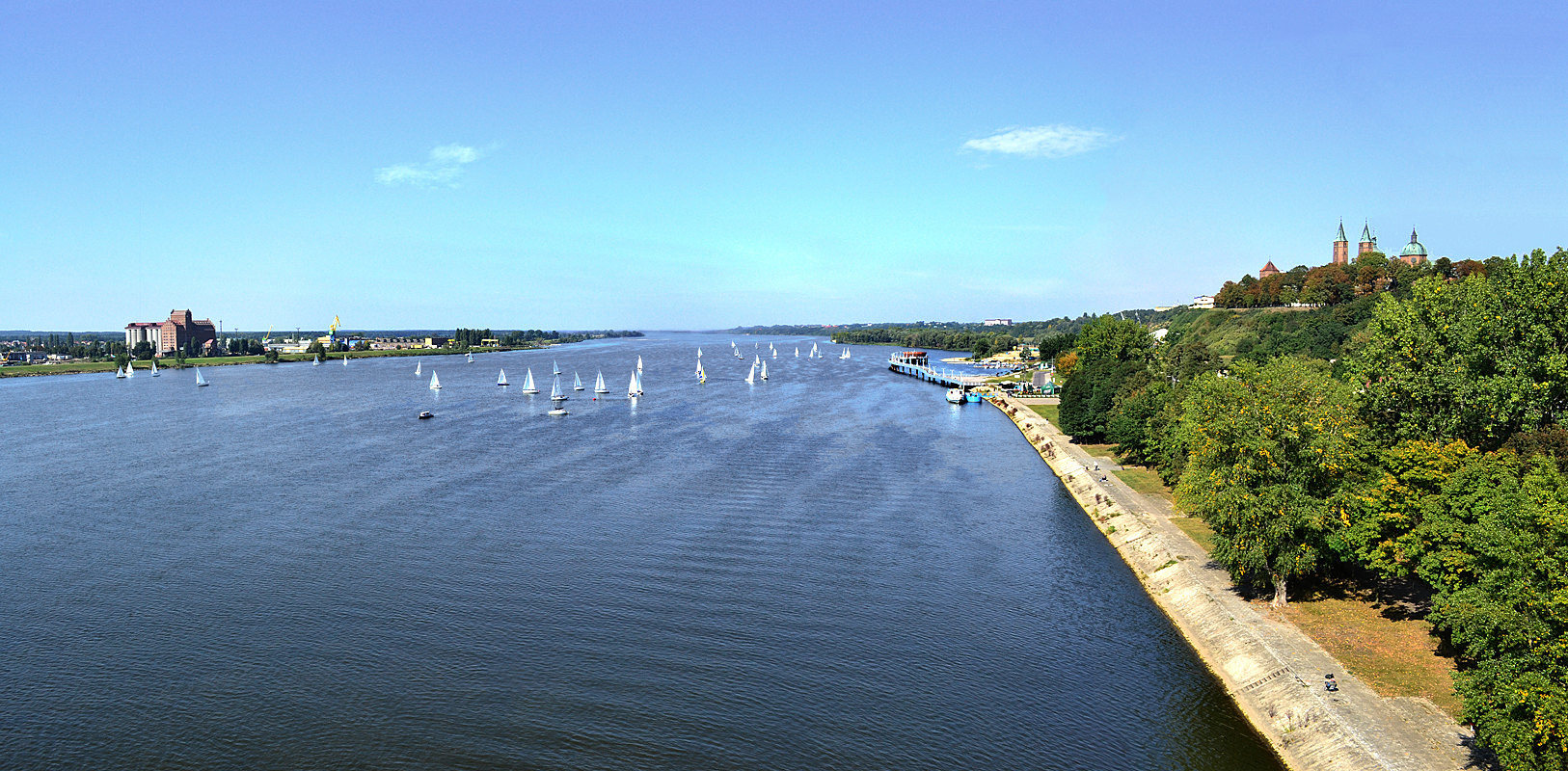
Vistula River in the vicinity of Płock, Poland

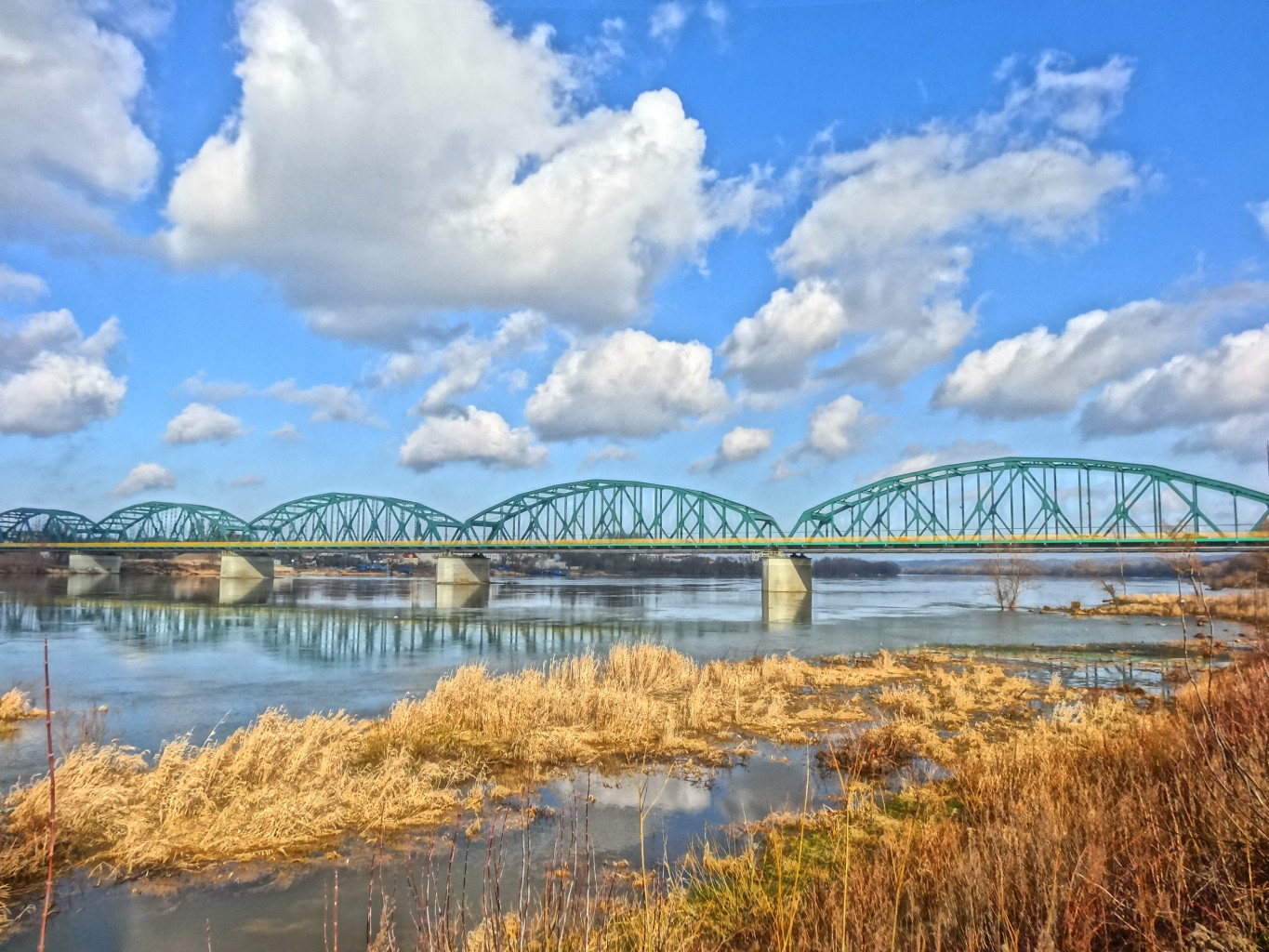
Vistula River near Bydgoszcz, Poland

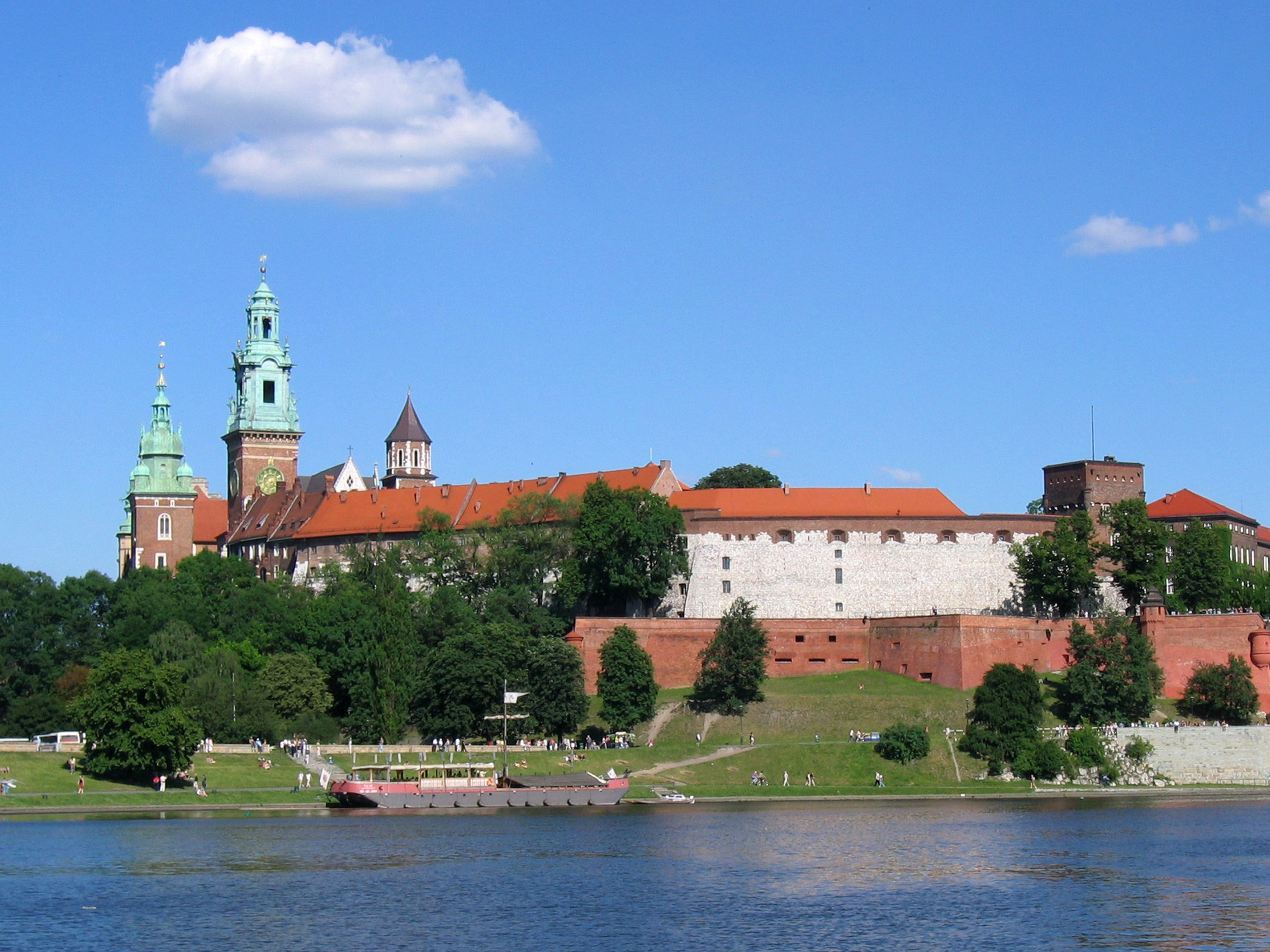
Medieval Wawel Castle in Kraków seen from the Vistula river

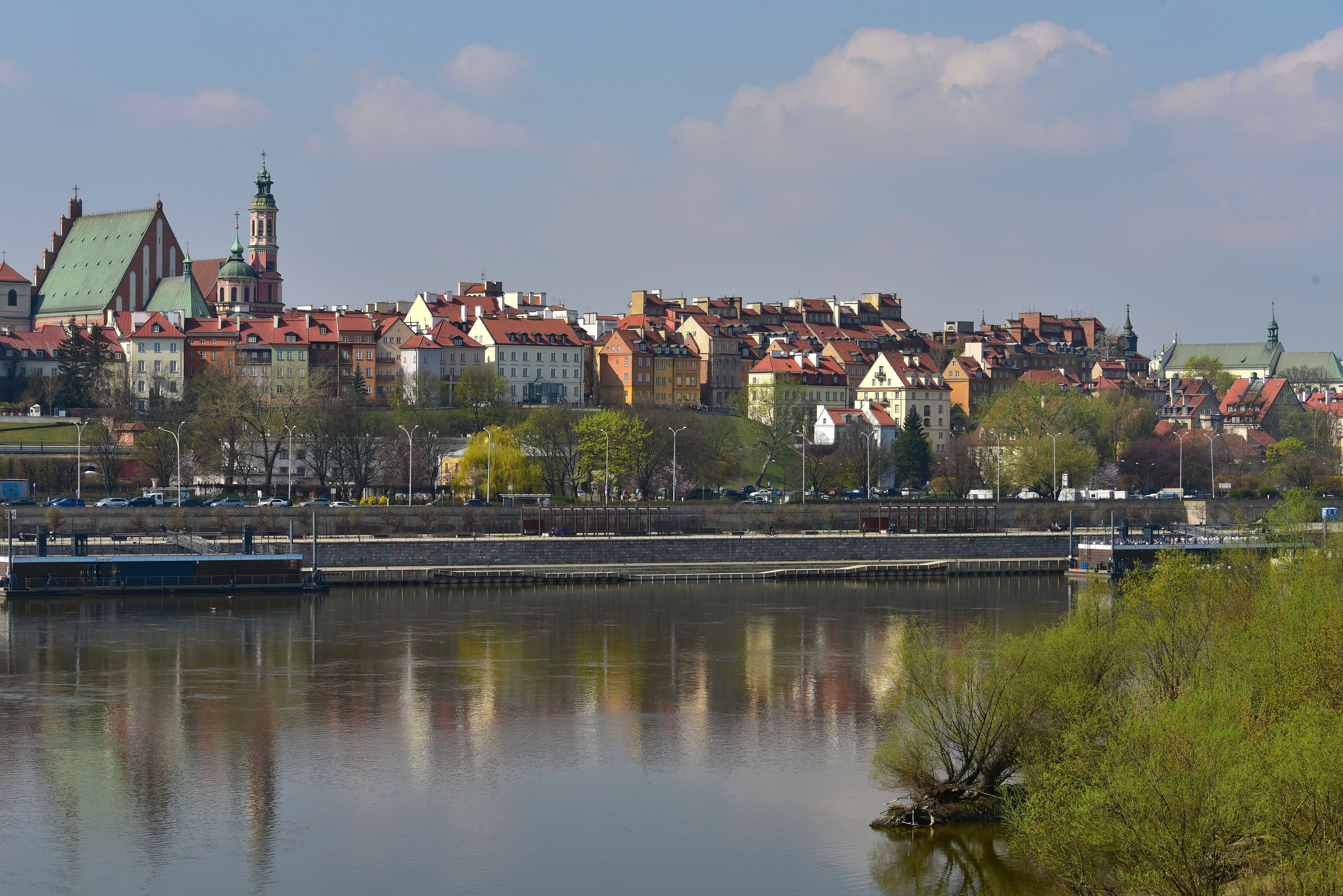
Vistula River and the Warsaw Old Town

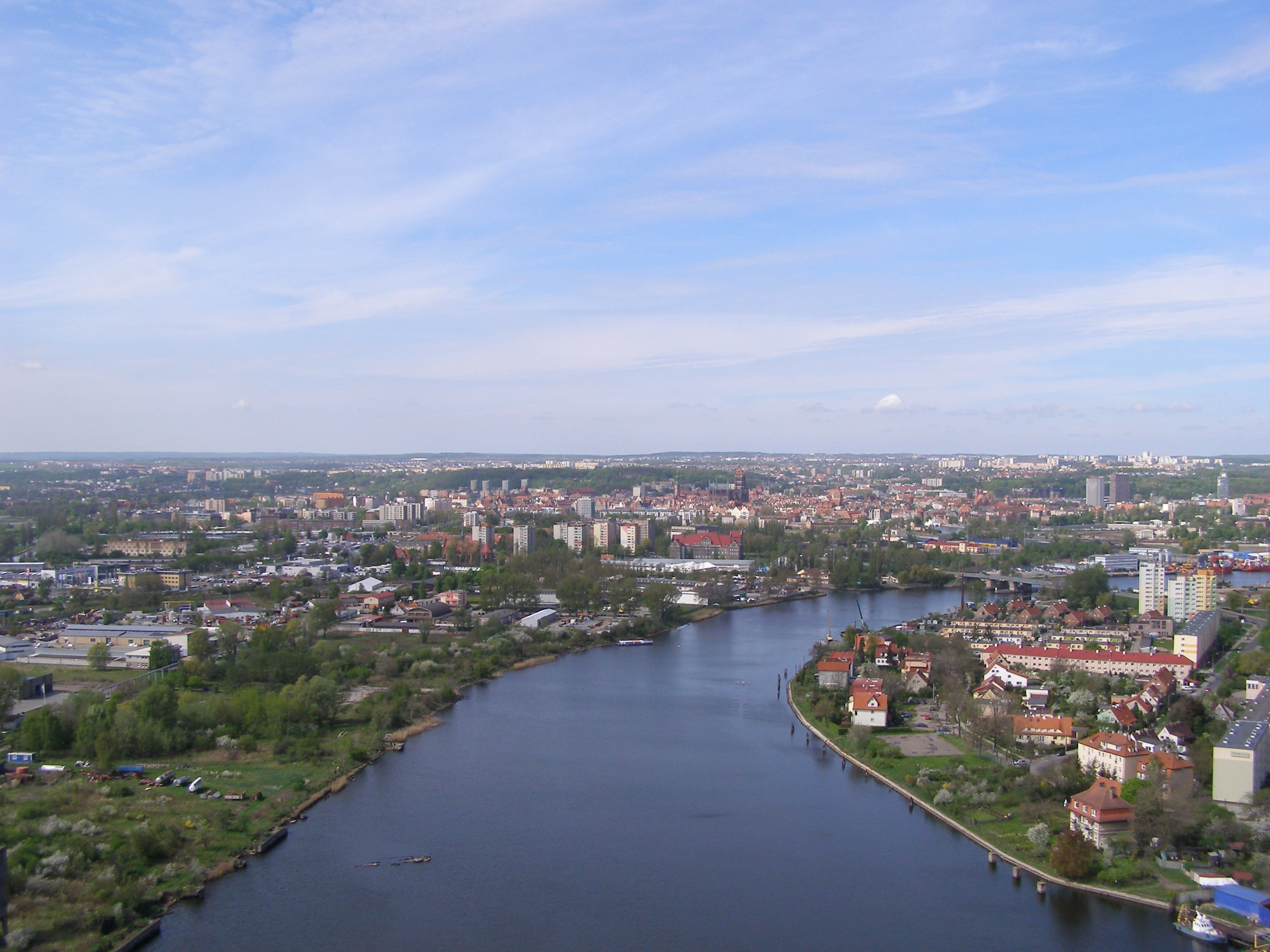
Vistula River and Gdańsk

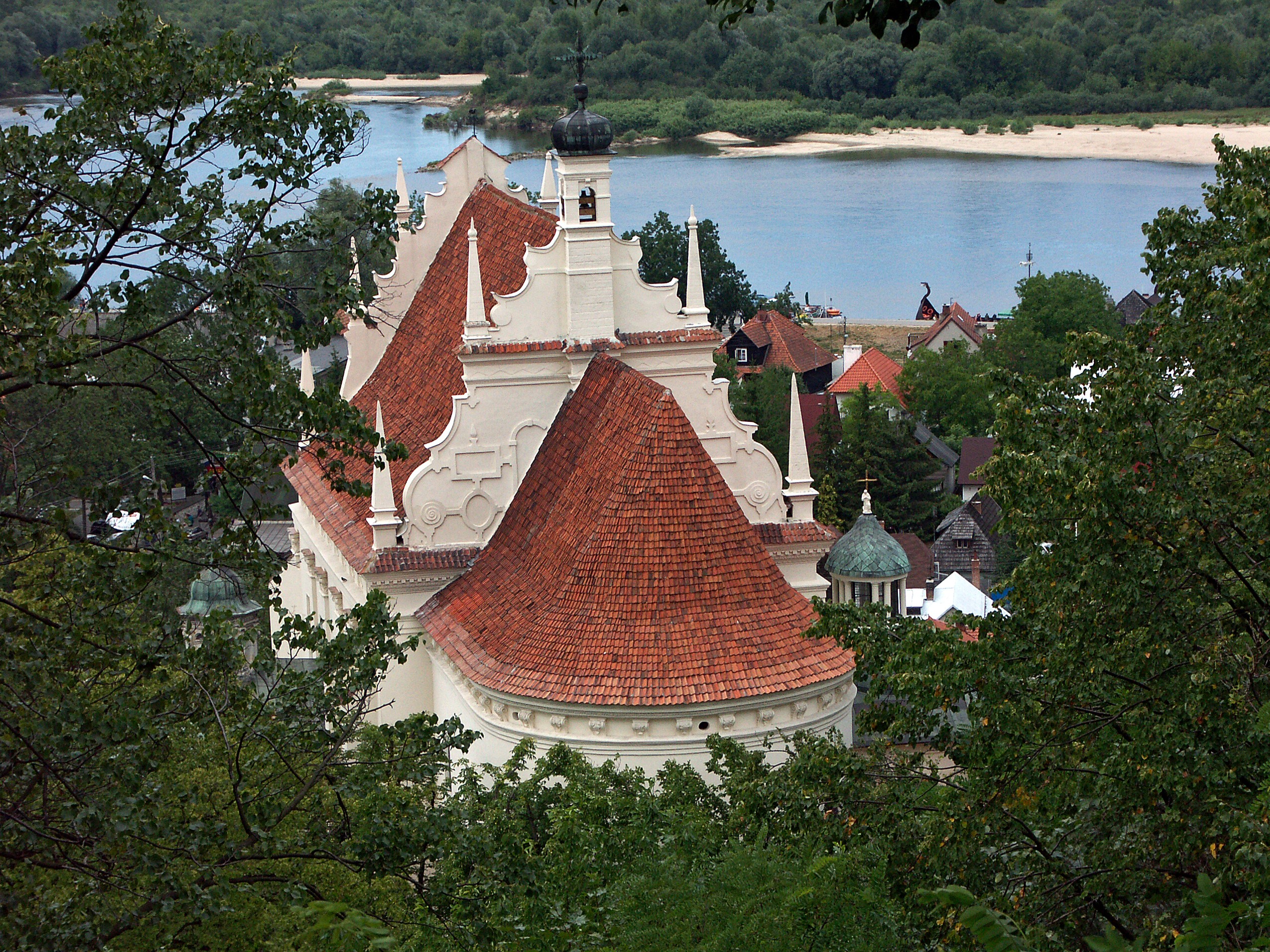
Renaissance town of Kazimierz Dolny overlooking serene Vistula

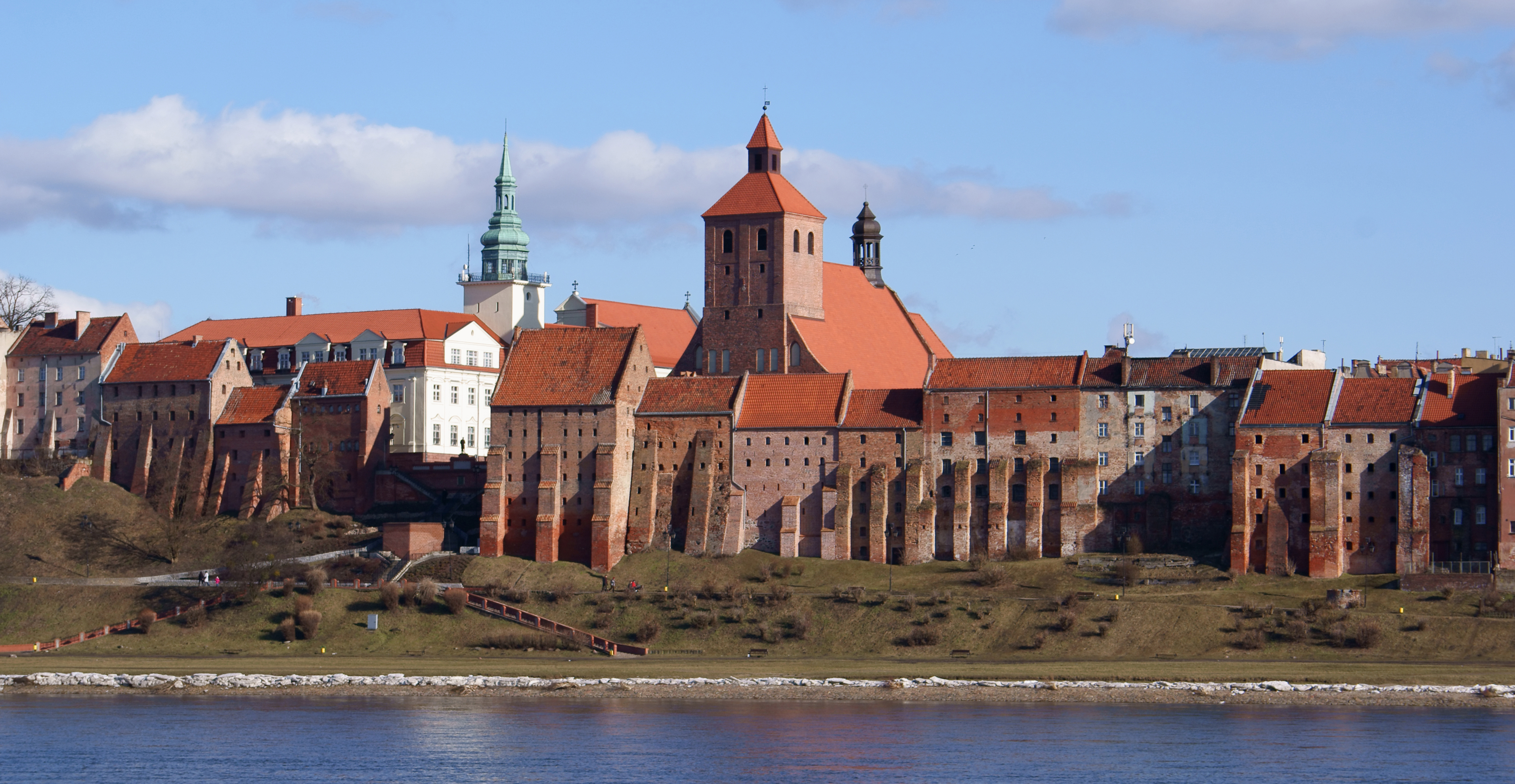
Granaries in Grudziądz seen from the left riverside of the Vistula river, 13th–17th century

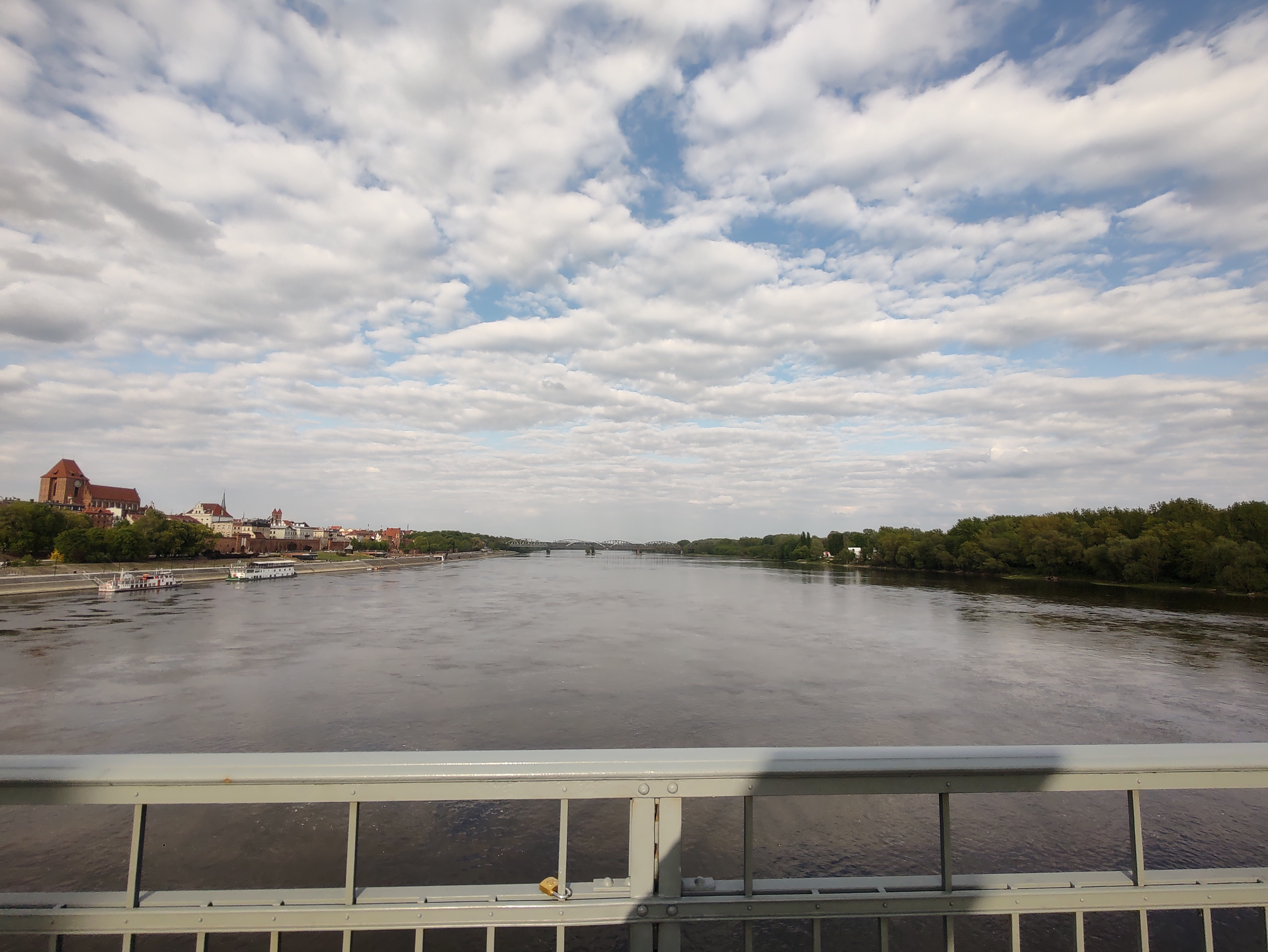
Vistula River seen from The Piłsudski Bridge in Toruń, facing upstream

Agglomeration	Tributary
Wisła (Silesian Voivodeship)	river source: Biała Wisełka and Czarna Wisełka
Ustroń	
Skoczów	Brennica
Strumień	Knajka
Goczałkowice-Zdrój	
Czechowice-Dziedzice	Biała
Brzeszcze	Vistula, Soła
Oświęcim	Soła
Zator	Skawa
Skawina	Skawinka
Kraków (Cracow)	Sanka, Rudawa, Prądnik, Dłubnia, Wilga (most are canalized streams)
Niepołomice	
Nowe Brzesko	
Nowy Korczyn	Nida
Opatowiec	Dunajec
Szczucin	
Połaniec	Czarna
Baranów Sandomierski	Babolówka
Tarnobrzeg	
Sandomierz	Koprzywianka, Trześniówka
Zawichost	
Annopol	Sanna
Józefów nad Wisłą	
Solec nad Wisłą	
Kazimierz Dolny	Bystra
Puławy	Kurówka
Dęblin	Wieprz
Magnuszew	
Wilga	Wilga
Góra Kalwaria	Czarna
Karczew	
Otwock, Józefów	Świder
Konstancin-Jeziorna	Jeziorka
Warsaw	Żerań canal (incl. several smaller streams)
Łomianki	
Legionowo	
Modlin	Narew
Zakroczym	
Czerwińsk nad Wisłą	
Wyszogród	Bzura
Płock	Słupianka, Rosica, Brzeźnica, Skrwa Lewa, Skrwa Prawa
Dobrzyń nad Wisłą	
Włocławek	Zgłowiączka
Nieszawa	Mień
Ciechocinek	
Toruń	Drwęca, Bacha
Solec Kujawski	
Bydgoszcz	Brda (canalized)
Chełmno	
Świecie	Wda
Grudziądz	
Nowe	
Gniew	Wierzyca
Tczew	
Mikoszewo, Gdańsk (Sobieszewo Island)	Szkarpawa, Martwa Wisła

== Delta ==
The river forms a wide delta called Żuławy Wiślane, or the "Vistula Fens" in English. The delta currently starts around Biała Góra near Sztum, about 50 km (31 mi) from the mouth, where the river Nogat splits off. The Nogat also starts separately as a river named (on this map) Alte Nogat (Old Nogat) south of Kwidzyn, but further north it picks up water from a crosslink with the Vistula, and becomes a distributary of the Vistula, flowing away northeast into the Vistula Lagoon (Polish: Zalew Wiślany) with a small delta. The Nogat formed part of the border between East Prussia and interwar Poland. The other channel of the Vistula below this point is sometimes called the Leniwka.

Various causes (rain, snow melt, ice jams) have caused many severe floods of the Vistula over the centuries. Land in the area was sometimes depopulated by severe flooding, and later had to be resettled.

See (Figure 7, on page 812 at History of floods on the River Vistula) for a reconstruction map of the delta area as it was around the year 1300: note much more water in the area, and the west end of the Vistula Lagoon (Frisches Haff) was bigger and nearly continuous with the Drausen See.

=== Channel changes ===
As with some aggrading rivers, the lower Vistula has been subject to channel changing.

Near the sea, the Vistula was diverted sideways by coastal sand as a result of longshore drift and split into an east-flowing branch (the Elbing (Elbląg) Vistula, Elbinger Weichsel, Szkarpawa, flows into the Vistula Lagoon, now for flood control closed to the east with a lock) and a west-flowing branch (the Danzig (Gdańsk) Vistula, Przegalinie branch, reached the sea in Danzig). Until the 14th century, the Elbing Vistula was the bigger.

- 1242: The Stara Wisła (Old Vistula) cut an outlet to the sea through the barrier near Mikoszewo where the Vistula Cut is now; this gap later closed or was closed.
- 1371: The Danzig Vistula became bigger than the Elbing Vistula.
- 1540 and 1543: Huge floods depopulated the delta area, and afterwards the land was resettled by Mennonite Germans, and economic development followed.
- 1553: By a plan made by Danzig and Elbing, a channel was dug between the Vistula and the Nogat at Weissenberg (now Biała Góra). As a result, most of the Vistula water flowed down the Nogat, which hindered navigation at Danzig by lowering the water level; this caused a long dispute about the river water between Danzig on one side and Elbing and Marienburg on the other side.
- 1611: Great flood near Marienburg.
- 1613: As a result, a royal decree was issued to build a dam at Biała Góra, diverting only a third of the Vistula's water into the Nogat.
- 1618–1648 Thirty Years' War and 1655–1661 Second Northern War: In wars involving Sweden the river works at Biała Góra were destroyed or damaged.
- 1724: Until this year the Vistula in Danzig flowed to sea straight through the east end of the Westerplatte. This year it started to turn west to flow south of the Westerplatte.
- 1747: In a big flood the Vistula broke into the Nogat.
- 1772: First Partition of Poland: Prussia got control of the Vistula delta area.
- 1793: Second Partition of Poland: Prussia got control of more of the Vistula drainage area.
- 1830 and later: Cleaning the riverbed; eliminating meanders; re-routing some tributaries, e.g. the Rudawa.
- 1840: A flood caused by an ice-jam formed a shortcut from the Danzig Vistula to the sea (shown as Durchbruch v. J 1840 (Breakthrough of year 1840), on this map), a few miles east of and bypassing Danzig, now called the Śmiała Wisła or Wisła Śmiała ("Bold Vistula"). The Vistula channel west of this lost much of its flow and was known thereafter as the Dead Vistula (German: Tote Weichsel; Polish: Martwa Wisła).
- 1848 or after: In flood control works the link from the Vistula to the Nogat was moved 4 km (2.5 miles) downstream. In the end, the Nogat got a fifth of the flow of the Vistula.
- 1888: A large flood in the Vistula delta.
- 1889 to 1895: As a result, to try to stop recurrent flooding on the lower Vistula, the Prussian government constructed an artificial channel about 12 kilometres (7.5 miles) east of Danzig (now named Gdańsk), known as the Vistula Cut (German: Weichseldurchstich; Polish: Przekop Wisły) (ref map) from the old fork of the Danzig and Elbing Vistulas straight north to the Baltic Sea, diverting much of the Vistula's flow. One main purpose was to let the river easily flush floating ice into the sea to avoid ice-jam floods downstream. This is now the main mouth of the Vistula, bypassing Gdańsk; Google Earth shows only a narrow new connection with water-control works with the old westward channel. The name Dead Vistula was extended to mean all of the old channel of the Vistula below this diversion.
- 1914–1917: The Elbing Vistula (Szkarpawa) and the Dead Vistula were cut off from the new main river course with the help of locks.
- 1944–1945: Retreating WWII German forces destroyed many flood-prevention works in the area. After the war, Poland needed over ten years to repair the damage.

Nogat			Leniwka		
Town	Tributaries	Remarks	Town	Tributaries	Remarks
Sztum			Tczew		
Malbork			Gdańsk	Motława, Radunia, Potok Oliwski	In the city the river divides into several separate branches that reach the Baltic Sea at different points, the main branch reaches the sea at Westerplatte
Elbląg	Elbląg	shortly before reaching Vistula Bay			

=== Tributaries ===
List of right and left tributaries with a nearby city, from source to mouth:

Right tributaries
- Brennica—Skoczów
- Iłownica
- Biała—Czechowice-Dziedzice
- Soła
- Skawa—Zator
- Skawinka—Skawina
- Wilga—Kraków
- Drwinka
- Raba
- Gróbka
- Uszwica
- Kisielina
- Dunajec
- Breń
- Brnik
- Wisłoka
- Babulówka—Baranów Sandomierski
- Trześniówka—Sandomierz
- Łęg—Sandomierz
- San
- Sanna—Annopol
- Wyżnica—Józefów
- Chodelka
- Bystra—Bochotnica
- Kurówka—Puławy
- Wieprz—Dęblin
- Okrzejka
- Promnik
- Wilga—Wilga
- Świder—Otwock, Józefów
- Kanał Żerański—Warsaw
- Narew—Nowy Dwór Mazowiecki
- Motława
- Słupianka—Płock
- Rosica—Płock
- Brzeźnica—Płock
- Skrwa Prawa—Płock
- Mień—Nieszawa
- Drwęca—Toruń
- Bacha—Toruń
- Struga
- Osa—Grudziądz
- Liwa

Left tributaries
- Knajka—Strumień
- Pszczynka
- Gostynia
- Przemsza—Chełmek
- Chech
- Rudno
- Sanka—Kraków
- Rudawa—Kraków
- Prądnik—Kraków
- Dłubnia—Kraków
- Roporek—Nowe Brzesko
- Szreniawa
- Nidzica
- Nida—Nowy Korczyn
- Strumień
- Czarna—Połaniec
- Koprzywianka—Sandomierz
- Opatówka
- Kamienna
- Krępianka—Solec nad Wisłą
- Iłżanka
- Zwoleńka
- Plewka—Janowiec
- Zagożdzonka—Kozienice
- Radomka
- Pilica—Warka
- Czarna—Góra Kalwaria
- Jeziorka—Konstancin-Jeziorna
- Bzura—Wyszogród
- Skrwa Lewa—Płock
- Zgłowiączka—Włocławek
- Tążyna
- Zielona
- Brda—Bydgoszcz
- Wda—Świecie
- Wierzyca—Gniew
- Motława—Gdańsk
- Radunia—Gdańsk

=== Climate change and the flooding of the Vistula delta ===
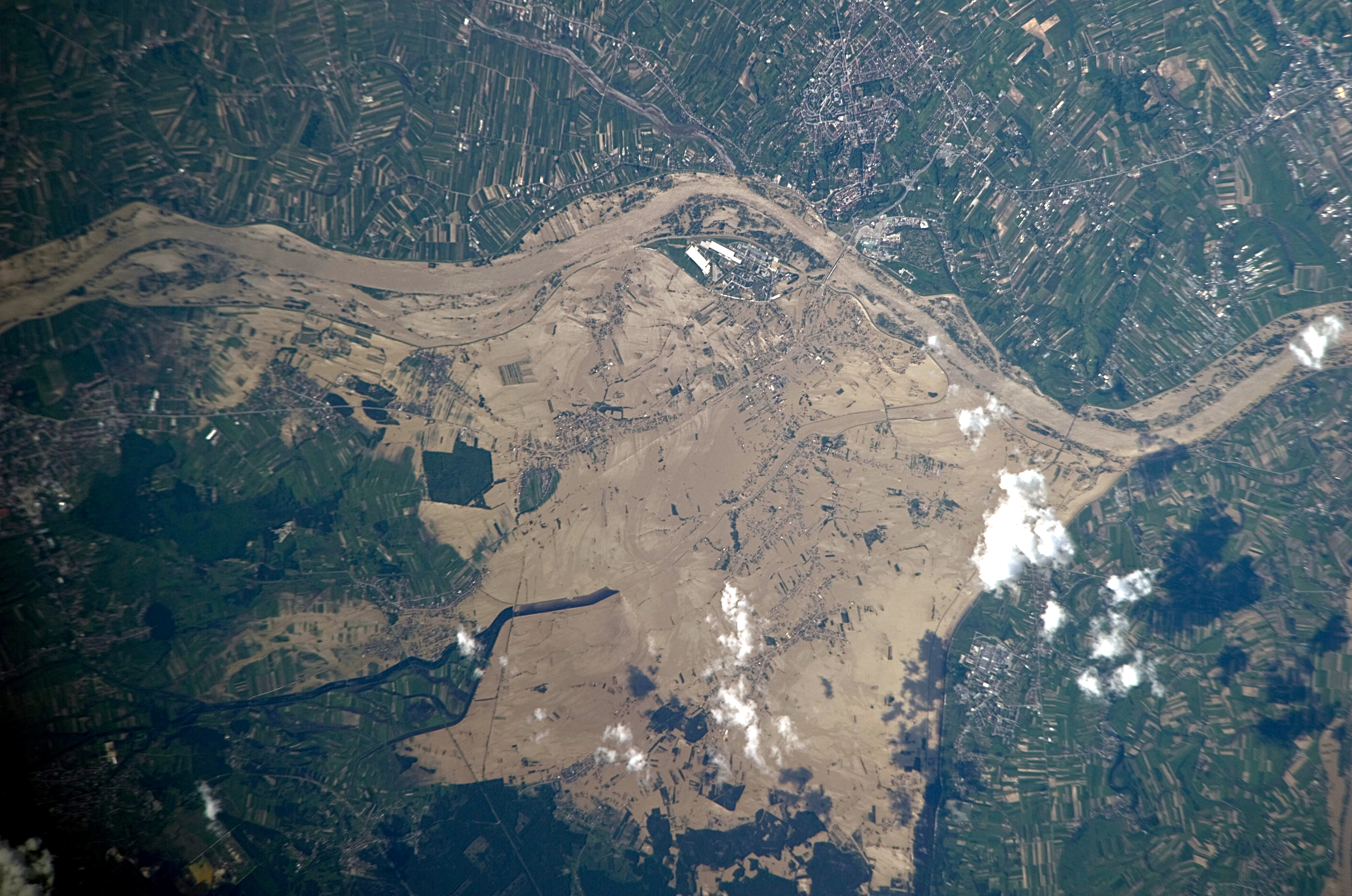
Widespread flooding along the Vistula River in south-eastern Poland

According to flood studies carried out by Zbigniew Pruszak, who is the co-author of the scientific paper Implications of SLR and further studies carried out by scientists attending Poland's Final International ASTRA Conference, and predictions stated by climate scientists at the climate change pre-summit in Copenhagen, it is highly likely most of the Vistula Delta region (which is below sea level) will be flooded due to the sea level rise caused by climate change by 2100.

== Geological history ==
The history of the River Vistula and its valley spans over 2 million years. The river is connected to the geological period called the Quaternary, in which distinct cooling of the climate took place. In the last million years, an ice sheet entered the area of Poland eight times, bringing along with it changes of reaches of the river. In warmer periods, when the ice sheet retreated, the Vistula deepened and widened its valley. The river took its present shape within the last 14,000 years, after the complete recession of the Scandinavian ice sheet from the area. At present, along with the Vistula valley, erosion of the banks and collecting of new deposits are still occurring.

As the principal river of Poland, the Vistula is also in the centre of Europe. Three principal geographical and geological land masses of the continent meet in its river basin: the Eastern European Plain, Western Europe, and the Alpine zone to which the Alps and the Carpathians belong. The Vistula begins in the Carpathian mountains. The run and character of the river were shaped by ice sheets flowing down from the Scandinavian peninsula. The last ice sheet entered the area of Poland about 20,000 years ago. During periods of warmer weather, the ancient Vistula, "Pra-Wisła", searched for the shortest way to the sea—thousands of years ago it flowed into the North Sea somewhere at the latitude of contemporary Scotland. The climate of the Vistula valley, its plants, animals, and its very character changed considerably during the process of glacial retreat.

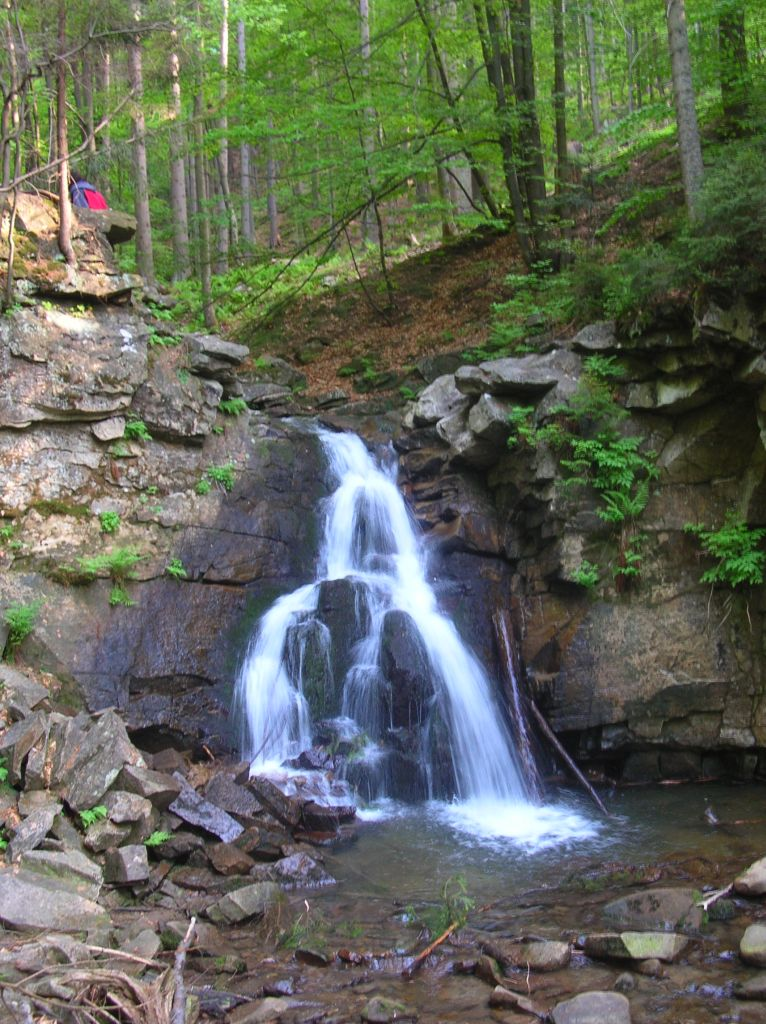
Biała Wisełka

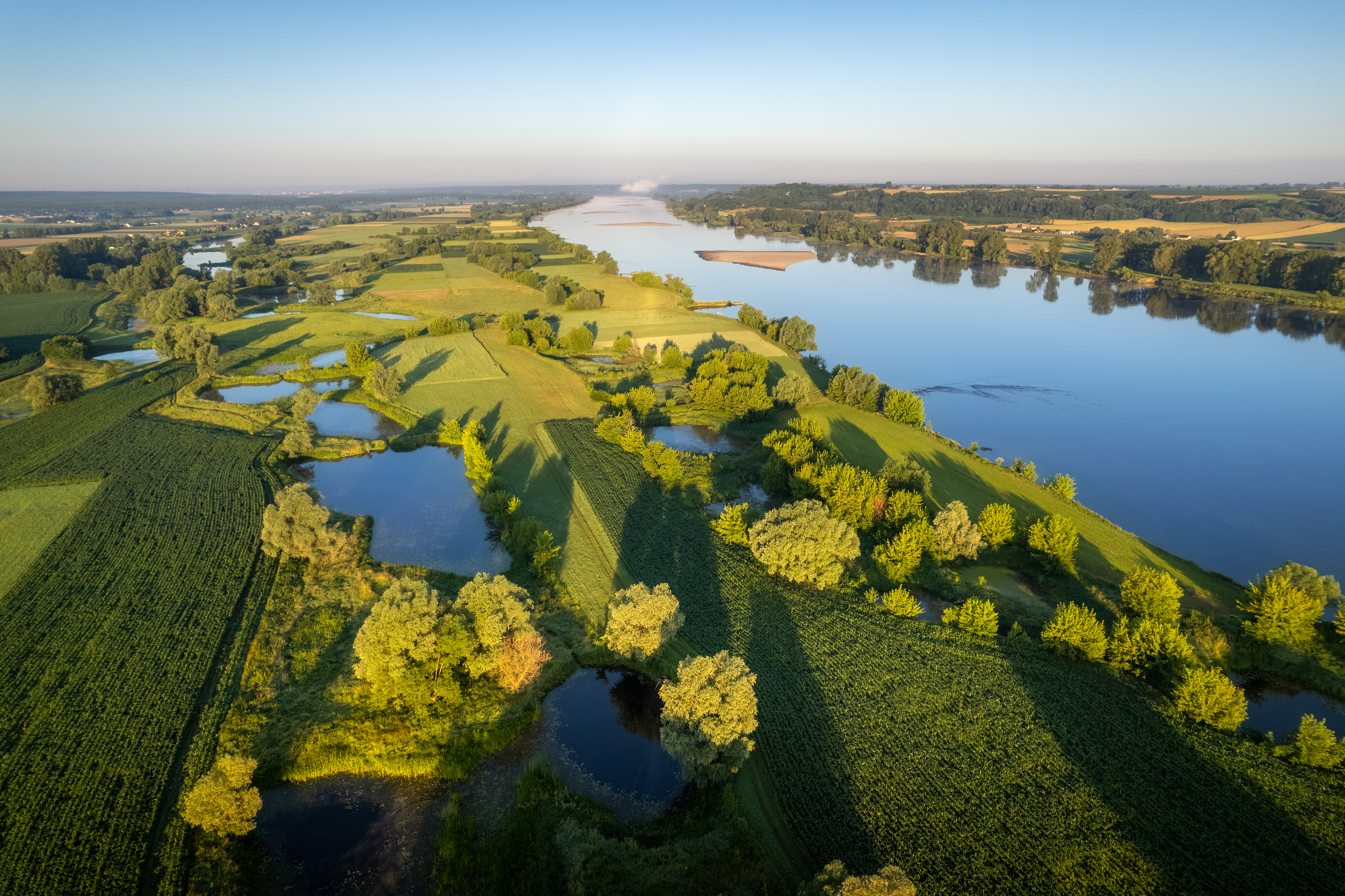
Vistula in northern Poland

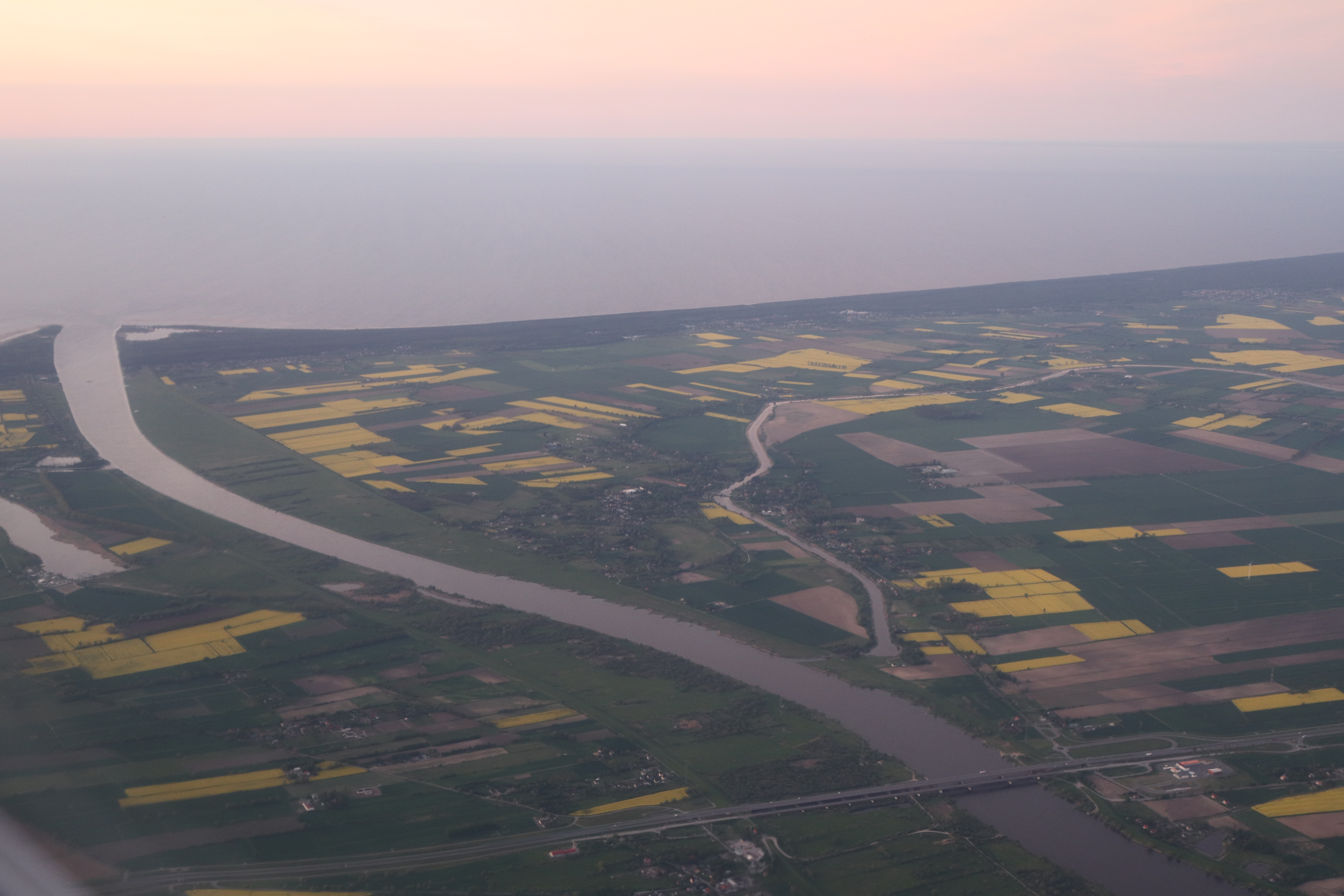
Przekop Wisły

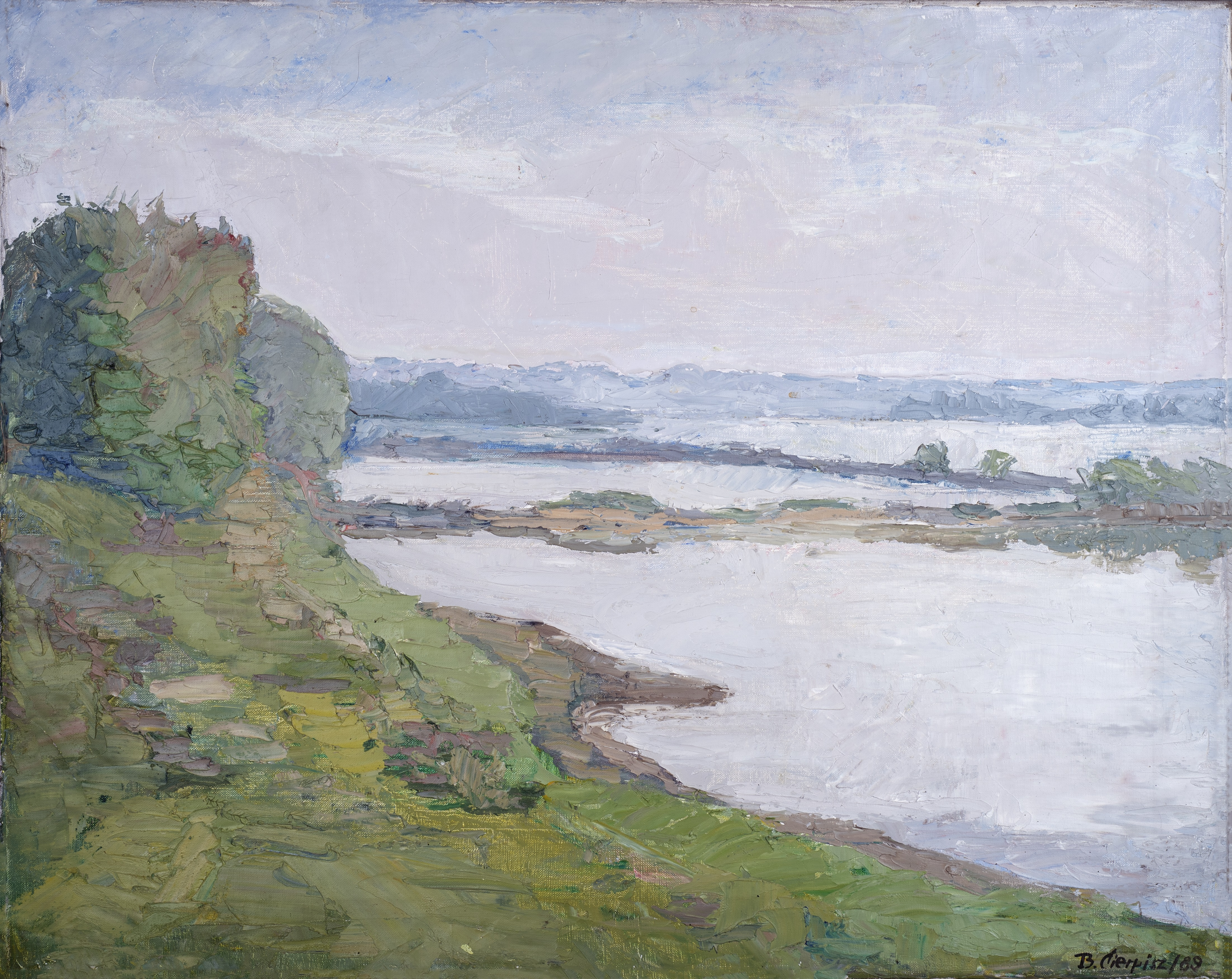
Vistula Shore, painted by Bogdan Cierpisz in 1898, oil on canvas

== Navigation ==
Vistula is navigable from the Baltic Sea to Bydgoszcz (where the Bydgoszcz Canal joins the river). It can accommodate modest river vessels of CEMT class II. Farther upstream the river depth lessens. Although a project was undertaken to increase the traffic-carrying capacity of the river upstream of Warsaw by building a number of locks in and around Kraków, this project was not extended further, so that navigability of the Vistula remains limited. The potential of the river would increase considerably if a restoration of the east–west connection via the Narew–Bug–Mukhovets–Pripyat–Dnieper waterways were considered. The shifting economic importance of parts of Europe may make this option more likely.

Vistula is the northern part of the proposed E40 waterway, continuing eastward into the Bug River, linking the Baltic Sea to the Black Sea.

== 1997 Floods ==
In July 1997, the Vistula River basin was struck by one of the largest floods in modern Polish history, an event commonly referred to as the Great Flood of 1997, or the Millennium Flood (Powódź tysiąclecia). Prolonged heavy rainfall over the Upper Vistula catchment and its tributaries caused extreme discharges and overtopping of embankments. Peak flows on the Upper Vistula reached magnitudes not previously observed in the instrumental record, leading to the breaching and failure of hundreds of kilometres of levees. The flood exposed weaknesses in existing hydraulic infrastructure along the Vistula. Reservoirs in the basin were unable to absorb the extreme inflows, since many had been designed primarily for water supply or power generation rather than flood retention. About 1,100 kilometres of flood embankments were damaged or weakened, particularly in the middle and lower reaches of the river. Inadequate forecasting and limited hydrometric coverage further reduced the effectiveness of warning systems.

The 1997 flood also highlighted long-standing structural vulnerabilities in the embankments of the Lower Vistula. A comprehensive study by Makowski (1998) documented the historical development of levees between Toruń and Biała Góra, presenting hydrological records from 1817–1995 and an assessment of the geotechnical properties of dikes and their foundations. The work emphasised recurring weaknesses such as unsteady seepage and localised failure zones, many of which were reactivated during extreme floods. Following the disaster, recommendations included the modernisation and raising of embankments, the construction of additional flood retention reservoirs and dry polders, and the improvement of forecasting systems using radar and telemetry.

=== Post-flood management works ===
The recommendations arising from the 1997 flood led to a series of large-scale civil engineering and flood management programmes in the Vistula basin. The most significant was the Oder–Vistula Flood Management Project (OVFMP). Preparatory work began in 2013 and the programme was formally launched in 2015 with an estimated budget of €1.2 billion. It was financed through the International Bank for Reconstruction and Development (World Bank), the Council of Europe Development Bank, the EU Cohesion Fund and the Polish state budget. The project’s objective was to increase protection against floods for communities in the Oder River and Upper Vistula river basins and to strengthen the institutional capacity of public administration in flood risk management. Its scope covered the middle and lower Oder, the Nysa Kłodzka valley, and the Upper Vistula including the areas of Kraków, Sandomierz and Tarnobrzeg, alongside tributary catchments such as the Raba and San. Beneficiaries were estimated at over 15 million people, including around 122,000 living in 1-in-100 year flood zones.

The programme includes the construction and modernisation of flood embankments, polders, pumping stations and reservoirs, together with non-structural measures such as improved forecasting and early warning systems. It also integrates active and passive measures, for example combining dikes with overflow areas and dry polders to create “space for the river,” as well as wetland restoration to absorb flood waves and enhance biodiversity.

A key element of the post-1997 strategy was the completion of new multi-purpose reservoirs. The most prominent was the Świnna Poręba Reservoir on the Skawa River, a Vistula tributary, which entered service in 2017 after decades of delay. Operated together with the existing Soła cascade and Dobczyce reservoir, Świnna Poręba provides substantial flood storage as well as water supply and hydropower. In addition to structural works, the flood also accelerated the modernisation of hydrological monitoring and early warning systems in the basin. Automatic telemetry stations, radar-based precipitation measurements, and GIS flood hazard mapping were introduced to improve forecasting and preparedness.

Studies published in 2017 reviewed water resources and management challenges across the river, reporting evidence of more frequent droughts and low-water periods, including record low levels at Toruń in 2015. Studies also noted changes in the river’s seasonal rhythm, with spring high waters arriving earlier and summer flows becoming lower. In the delta, researchers described saltwater moving further inland and changes in river branches such as the Martwa Wisła and Wisła Śmiała, with the conclusion that managing the river now requires balancing the risks of both major floods and recurring drought.

== Historical relevance ==
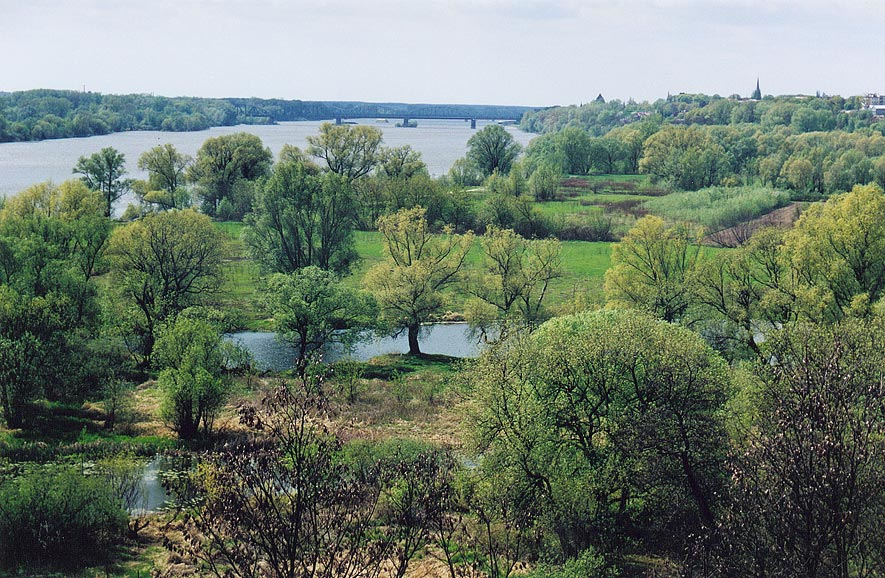
Vistula valley east (upstream) of Toruń

Large parts of the Vistula Basin were occupied by the Iron Age Lusatian and Przeworsk cultures in the first millennium BC. Genetic analysis indicates that there has been an unbroken genetic continuity of the inhabitants over the last 3,500 years. The western part of the Vistula Basin along with the lands of the Rhine, Danube, Elbe, and Oder came to be called Magna Germania by Roman authors of the first century AD. This does not imply that the inhabitants were "Germanic peoples" in the modern sense of the term; Tacitus, when describing the Venethi, Peucini and Fenni, wrote that he was not sure if he should call them Germans, since they had settlements and they fought on foot, or rather Sarmatians since they have some similar customs to them. Ptolemy, in the second century AD, would describe the Vistula as the border between Germania and Sarmatia.

Vistula River used to be connected to the Dnieper River, and thence to the Black Sea via the Augustów Canal, a technological marvel with numerous sluices contributing to its aesthetic appeal. It was the first waterway in Central Europe to provide a direct link between the two major rivers, the Vistula and the Neman. It provided a link with the Black Sea to the south through the Oginski Canal, Dnieper River, Berezina Canal, and Dvina River. The Baltic Sea– Vistula– Dnieper– Black Sea route with its rivers was one of the most ancient trade routes, the Amber Road, on which amber and other items were traded from Northern Europe to Greece, Asia, Egypt, and elsewhere.

The Vistula estuary was settled by Slavs in the seventh and eighth century. Based on archaeological and linguistic findings, it has been postulated that these settlers moved northward along the Vistula River. This however contradicts another hypothesis supported by some researchers saying the Veleti moved westward from the Vistula delta.

A number of West Slavic Polish tribes formed small dominions beginning in the eighth century, some of which coalesced later into larger ones. Among the tribes listed in the Bavarian Geographer's ninth-century document was the Vistulans (Wiślanie) in southern Poland. Kraków and Wiślica were their main centres.

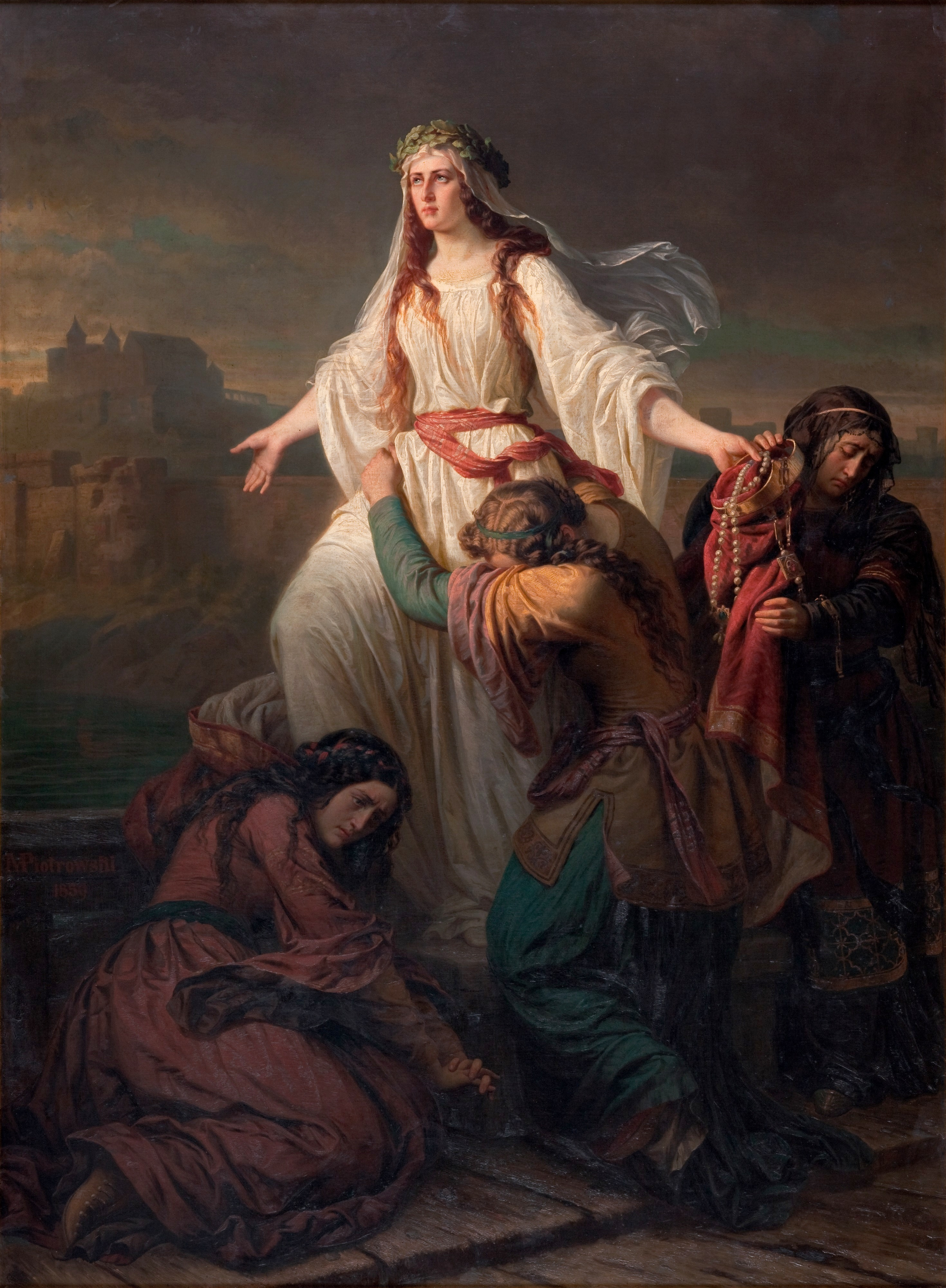
Death of Princess Wanda, by Maximilian Piotrowski, 1859

Many Polish legends are connected with the Vistula river and the beginnings of Polish statehood. One of the most enduring is that about Princess Wanda co nie chciała Niemca (who rejected the German). According to the most popular variant, popularized by the 15th-century historian Jan Długosz, Wanda, daughter of King Krak, became queen of the Poles upon her father's death. She refused to marry a German prince Rytigier (Rüdiger), who took offence and invaded Poland, but was repelled. Wanda however committed suicide, drowning in the Vistula River, to ensure he would not invade her country again.

=== Main trading artery ===
For hundreds of years the river was one of the main trading arteries of Poland, and the castles that line its banks were highly prized possessions. Salt, timber, grain, and building stone were among goods shipped via that route between the 10th and 13th centuries.

In the 14th century the lower Vistula was controlled by the Teutonic Knights Order, invited in 1226 by Konrad I of Masovia to help him fight the pagan Prussians on the border of his lands. In 1308 the Teutonic Knights captured the Gdańsk castle and murdered the population. Since then the event is known as the Gdańsk slaughter. The Order had inherited Gniew from Sambor II, thus gaining a foothold on the left bank of the Vistula. Many granaries and storehouses, built in the 14th century, line the banks of the Vistula. In the 15th century the city of Gdańsk gained great importance in the Baltic area as a centre of merchants and trade and as a port city. At this time the surrounding lands were inhabited by Pomeranians, but Gdańsk soon became a starting point for German settlement of the largely fallow Vistulan country.

Before its peak in 1618, trade increased by a factor of 20 from 1491. This factor is evident when looking at the tonnage of grain traded on the river in the key years of: 1491: 14,000; 1537: 23,000; 1563: 150,000; 1618: 310,000.

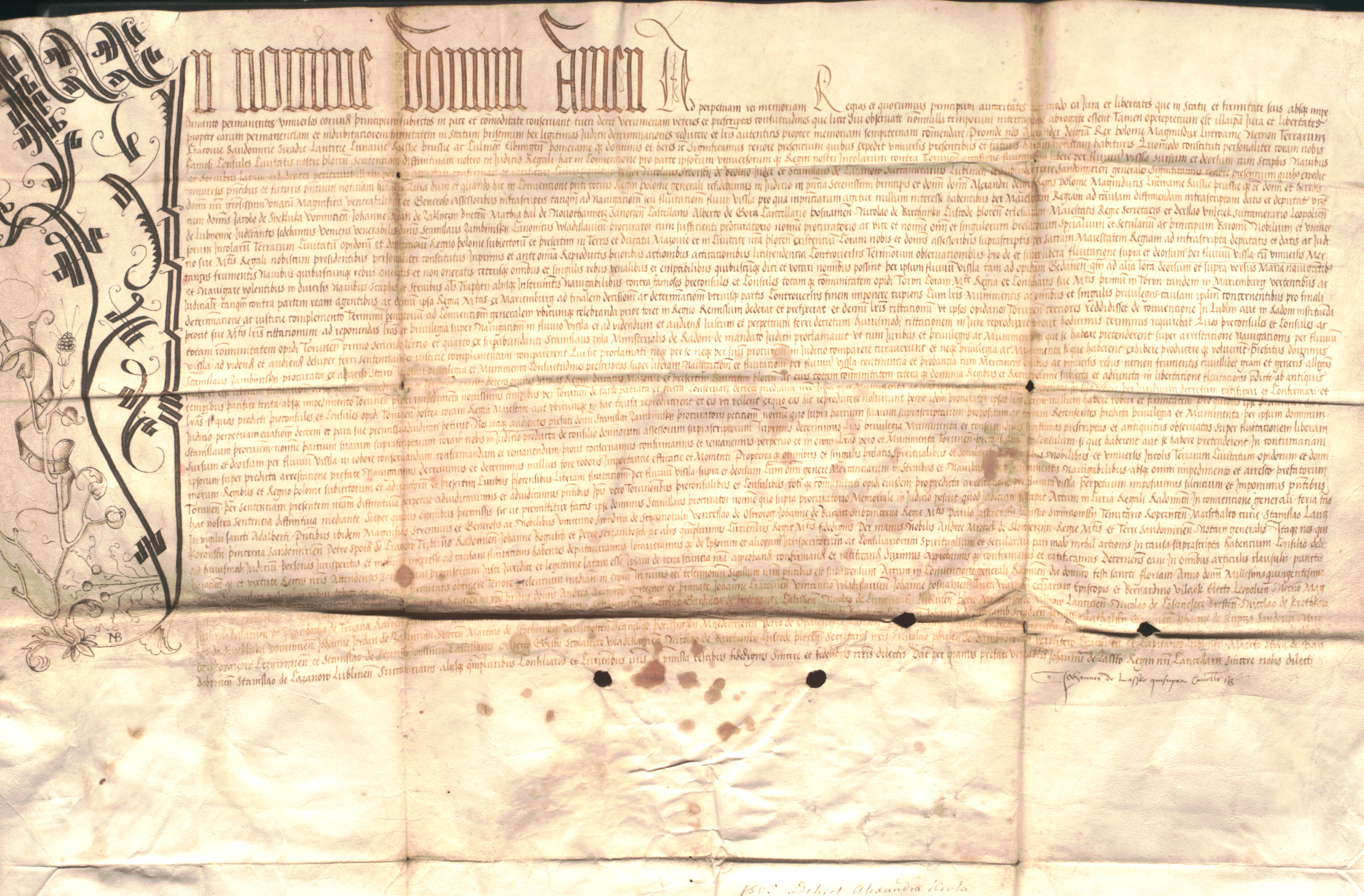
An edict issued by Alexander, King of Poland on 4 May 1505 proclaiming that sailing on the Vistula is unrestricted for all.

In the 16th century most of the grain exported was leaving Poland through Gdańsk, which because of its location at the end of the Vistula and its tributary waterway and of its Baltic seaport trade role became the wealthiest, most highly developed, and by far the largest centre of crafts and manufacturing, and the most autonomous of the Polish cities. Other towns were negatively affected by Gdańsk's near-monopoly in foreign trade. During the reign of Stephen Báthory Poland ruled two main Baltic Sea ports: Gdańsk controlling the Vistula river trade and Riga controlling the Western Dvina trade. Both cities were among the largest in the country. Around 70% the exports from Gdańsk were of grain.

Grain was also the largest export commodity of the Polish–Lithuanian Commonwealth. The volume of traded grain can be considered a good and well-measured proxy for the economic growth of the Commonwealth.

The owner of a folwark usually signed a contract with the merchants of Gdańsk, who controlled 80% of this inland trade, to ship the grain to Gdańsk. Many rivers in the Commonwealth were used for shipping, including the Vistula, which had a relatively well-developed infrastructure, with river ports and granaries. Most river shipping travelled north, with southward transport being less profitable, and barges and rafts often being sold off in Gdańsk for lumber.

In order to arrest recurrent flooding on the lower Vistula, the Prussian government in 1889–95 constructed an artificial channel about 12 kilometres (7 miles) east of Gdańsk (German name: Danzig)—known as the Vistula Cut (German: Weichseldurchstich; Polish: Przekop Wisły)—that acted as a huge sluice, diverting much of the Vistula flow directly into the Baltic. As a result, the historic Vistula channel through Gdańsk lost much of its flow and was known thereafter as the Dead Vistula (German: Tote Weichsel; Polish: Martwa Wisła). German states acquired complete control of the region in 1795–1812 (see: Partitions of Poland), as well as during the World Wars, in 1914–1918 and 1939–1945.

From 1867 to 1917, after the collapse of the January Uprising (1863–1865), the Russian tsarist administration called the Kingdom of Poland the Vistula Land.

Almost 75% of the territory of interbellum Poland was drained northward into the Baltic Sea by the Vistula (total area of drainage basin of the Vistula within boundaries of the Second Polish Republic was 180,300 km^{2} (69,600 sq mi), the Niemen (51,600 km^{2} [19,900 sq mi]), the Oder (46,700 km^{2} [18,000 sq mi]) and the Daugava (10,400 km^{2} [4,000 sq mi]).

In 1920, a decisive engagement of the Polish–Soviet War, the Battle of Warsaw (sometimes referred to as the Miracle on the Vistula), was fought as Red Army forces commanded by Mikhail Tukhachevsky approached the Polish capital of Warsaw and nearby Modlin Fortress by the river's mouth.

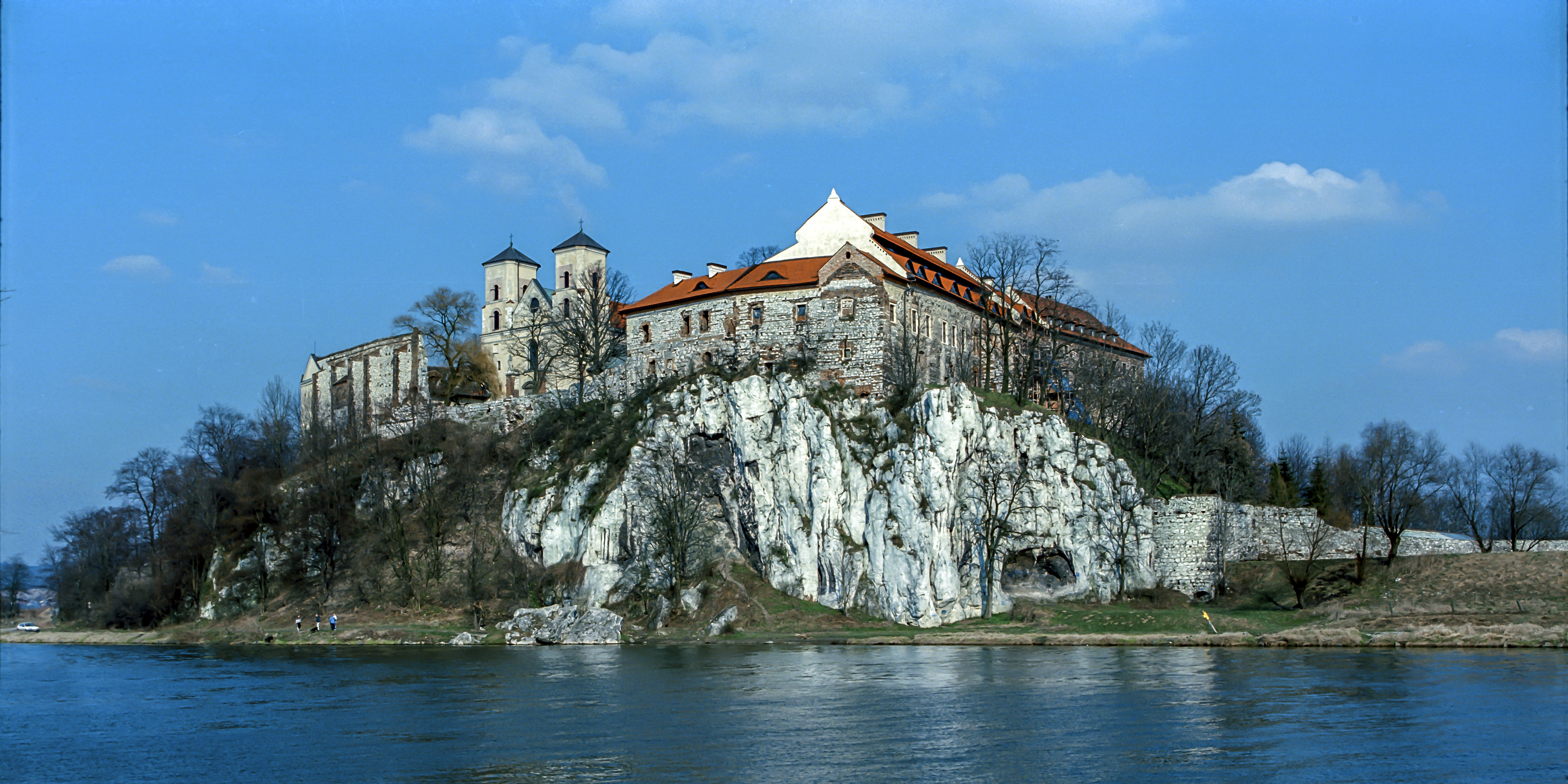
The 11th century Benedictine Abbey in Tyniec overlooks Vistula.

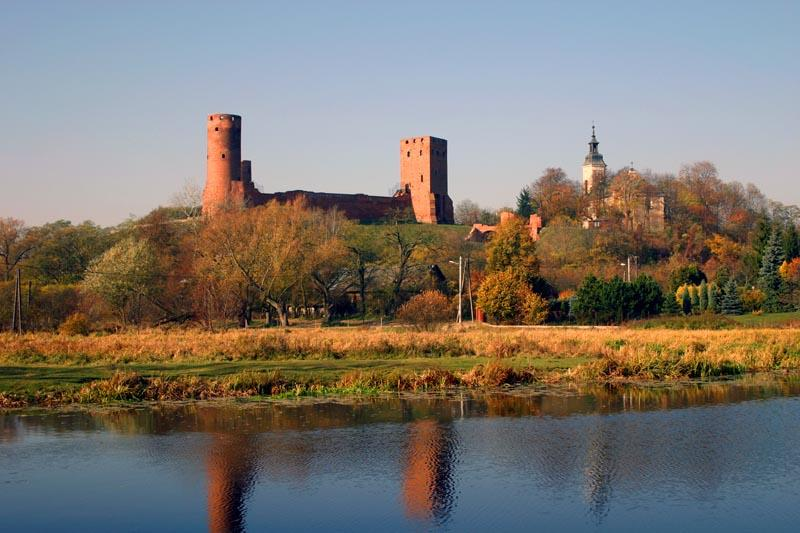
Vistula River near the Duke of Masovia Castle in Czersk

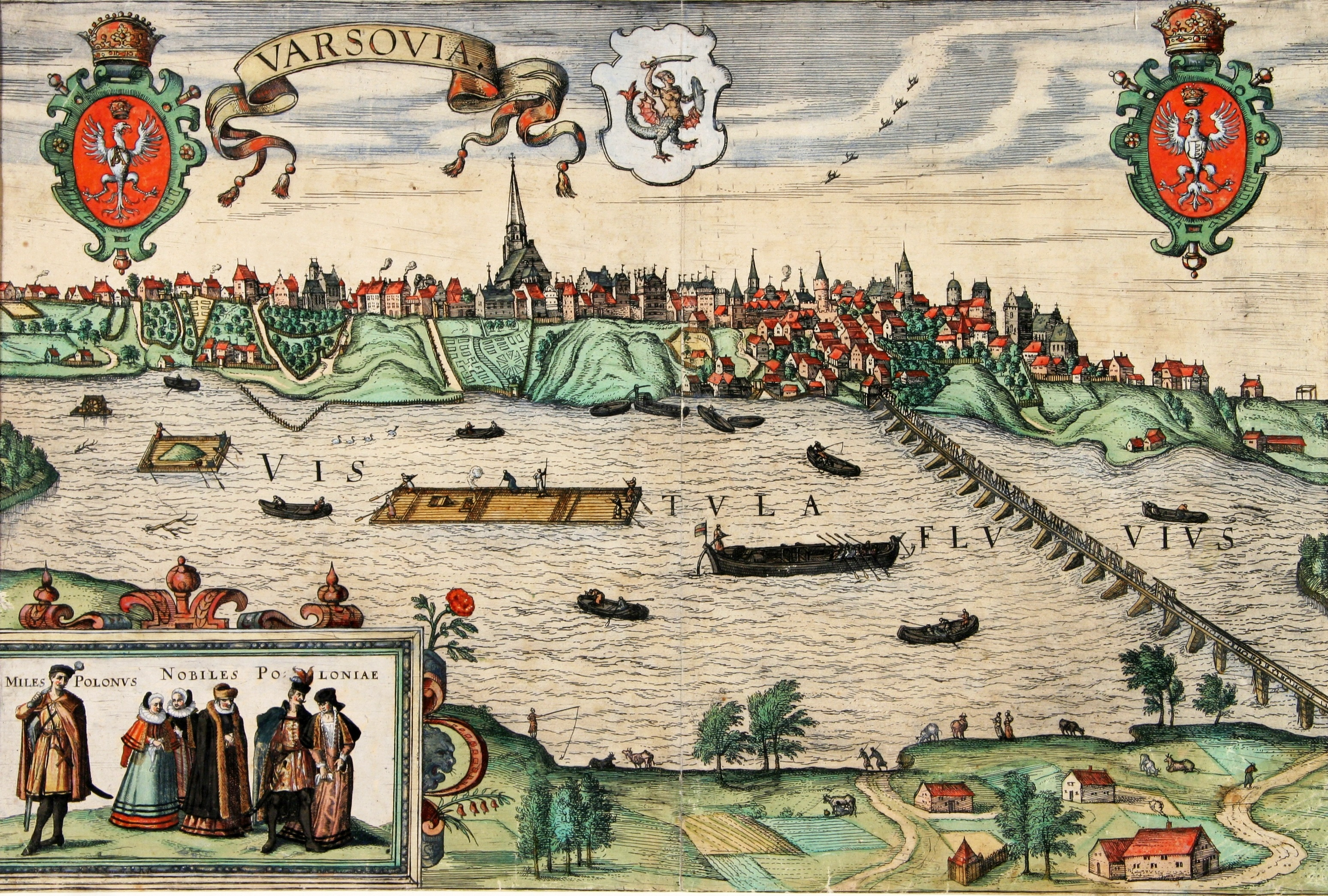
Vistula River in Warsaw near the end of the 16th century. The right side shows the Sigismund Augustus bridge built 1568–1573 by Erazm Cziotko (c. 500 m (1,600 ft) long).

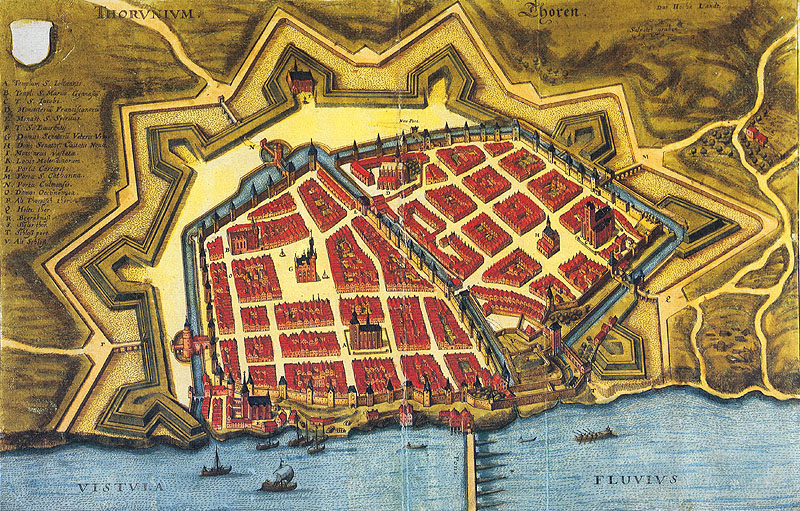
Vistula river (Vistvla fluvivs) in Toruń in 1641

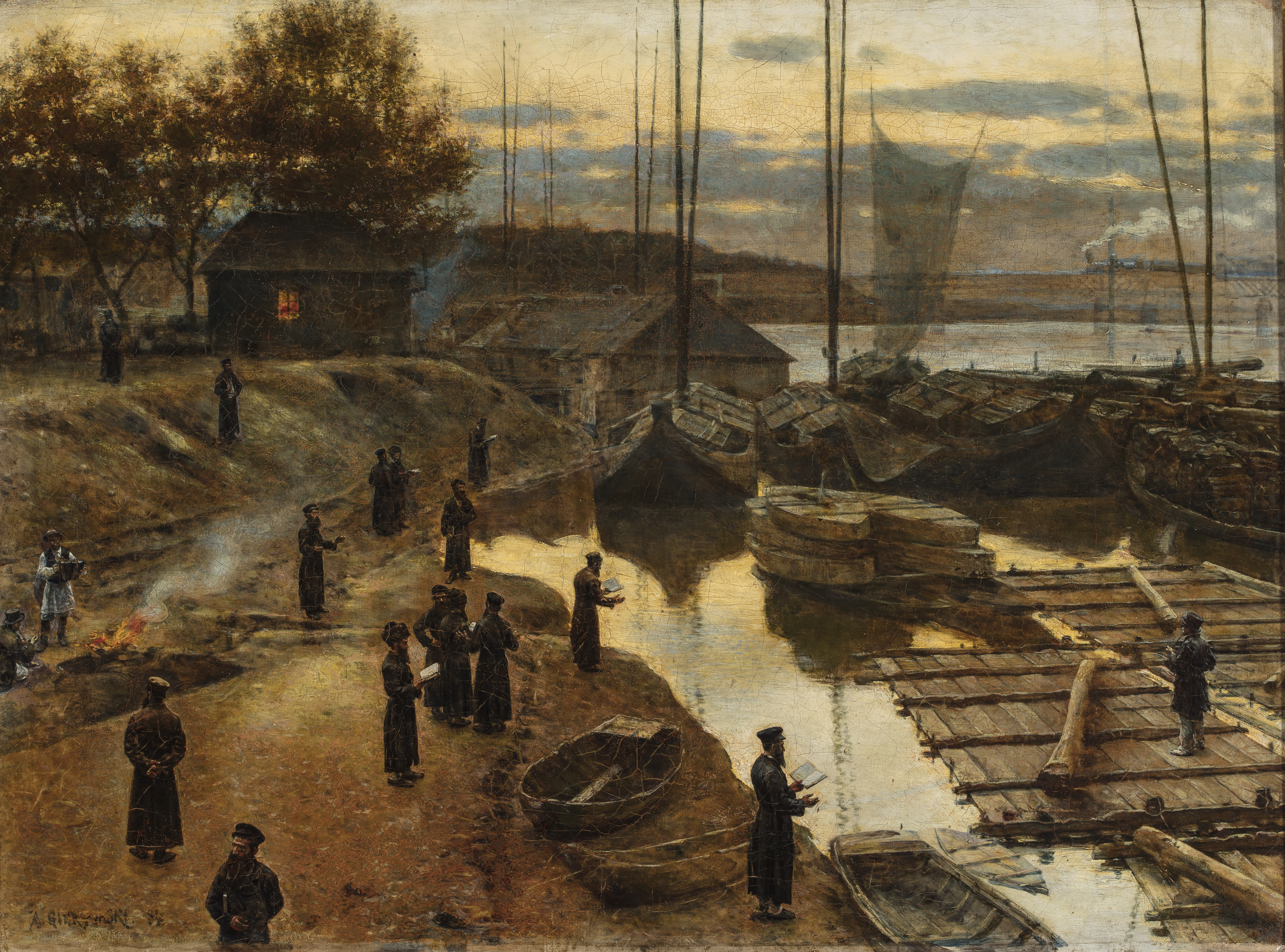
Jewish Feast of Trumpets (Polish: Święto trąbek) at the banks of the Vistula, Aleksander Gierymski, 1884

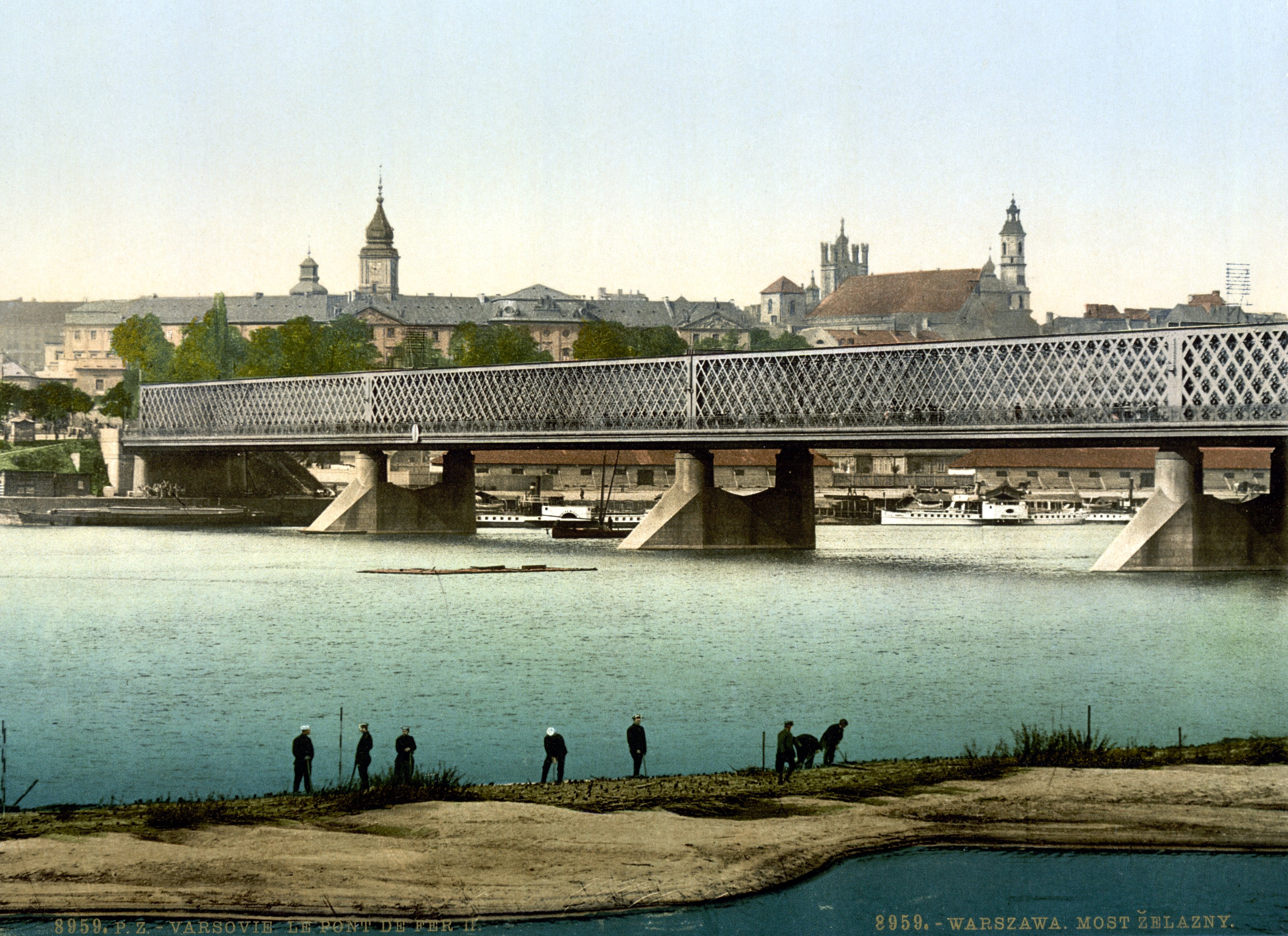
Kierbedź Bridge over the Vistula in Warsaw (c. 1900). This framework bridge was constructed by Stanisław Kierbedź in 1850–1864. It was destroyed by the Germans in 1944.

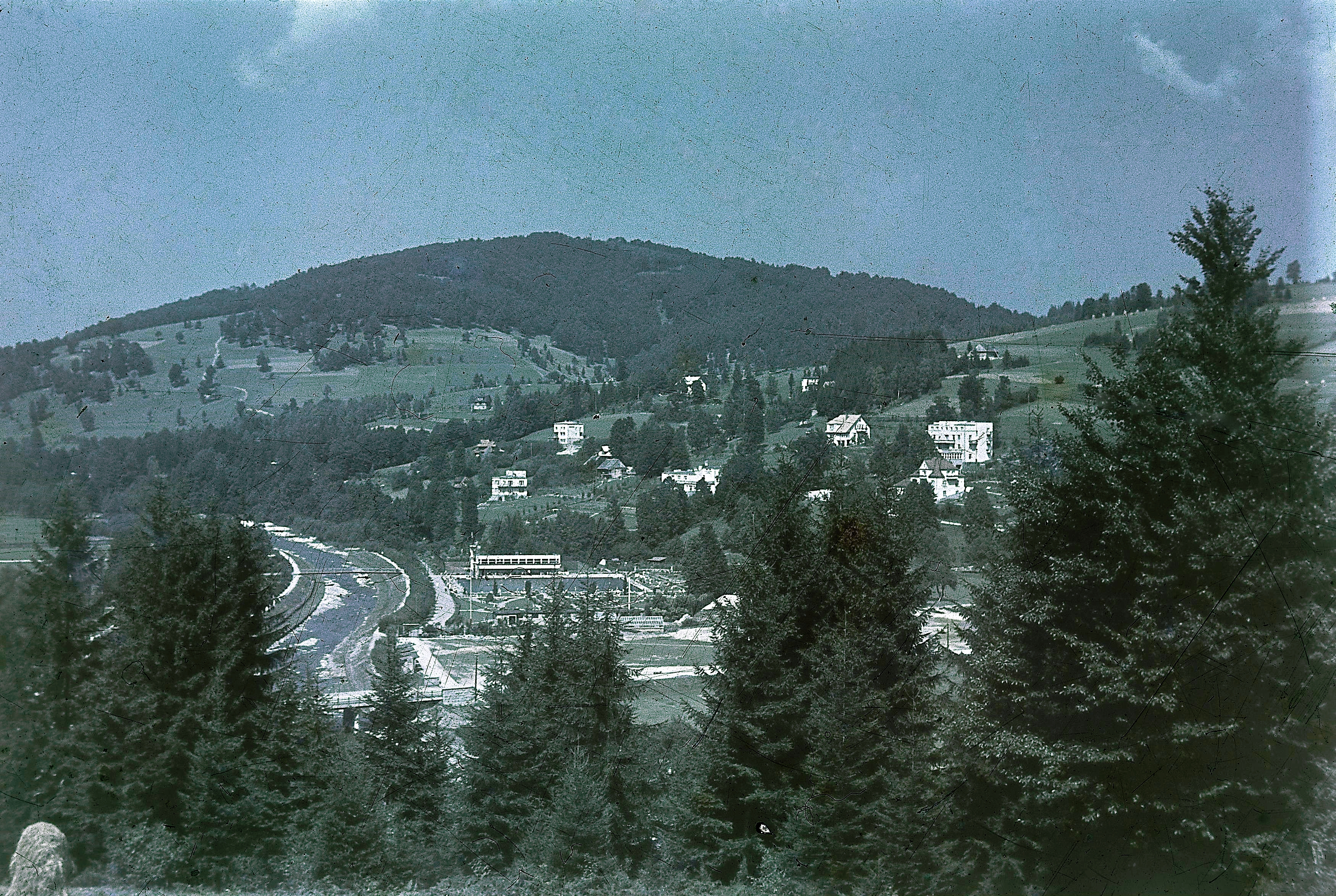
Vistula River in spa town Wisła (1939) just before the World War II

=== World War II ===
The Polish September campaign included battles over control of the mouth of the Vistula, and of the city of Gdańsk, close to the river delta. During the Invasion of Poland (1939), after the initial battles in Pomerelia, the remains of the Polish Army of Pomerania withdrew to the southern bank of the Vistula. After defending Toruń for several days, the army withdrew further south under pressure of the overall strained strategic situation, and took part in the main battle of Bzura.

The Auschwitz complex of concentration camps was at the confluence of the Vistula and the Soła rivers. Ashes of murdered Auschwitz victims were dumped into the river.

During World War II prisoners of war from the Nazi Stalag XX-B camp were assigned to cut ice blocks from the River Vistula. The ice would then be transported by truck to the local beer houses.

The 1944 Warsaw Uprising was planned with the expectation that the Soviet forces, who had arrived in the course of their offensive and were waiting on the other side of the Vistula River in full force, would help in the battle for Warsaw. However, the Soviets let down the Poles, stopping their advance at the Vistula and branding the insurgents as criminals in radio broadcasts.

In early 1945, in the Vistula–Oder Offensive, the Red Army crossed the Vistula and drove the German Wehrmacht back past the Oder river in Germany.

After the war in late 1946, the former Austrian SS member Amon Göth was sentenced to death and hanged on 13 September at the Montelupich Prison in Kraków, not far from the site of the Płaszów camp, the camp of which he was commandant throughout The Holocaust. His remains were cremated and the ashes thrown in the Vistula River.

== See also ==
- Geography of Poland
- List of rivers of Poland
- Vistula Lagoon
- Vistula Spit
