= List of tunnels by country =

The list of tunnels includes any road tunnel, railway tunnel or waterway tunnel anywhere in the world.

== Afghanistan ==
- Salang Tunnel

== Andorra ==
- Envalira Tunnel, road
- Pont Pla Tunnel, 1.26 km, road
- Sant Antoni Tunnel, 280 m, road
- Dos Valires Tunnel, 3 km, road

== Argentina ==
- Cristo Redentor Tunnel
- Raúl Uranga – Carlos Sylvestre Begnis Subfluvial Tunnel

== Azerbaijan ==
- Ziya Bunyadov tunnel Baku
- Darnagul tunnel Baku
- 20 January tunnel Baku
- Kalbajar Tunnel

== People's Republic of China ==
Specifically notable tunnels in the People's Republic of China include:

- Suzhou Metro Line 3-11, 86.54 km (53.773 mi), longest metro/rapid transit tunnel
- Line 6 (Chengdu Metro), 68.2 km (42.4 mi), third-longest metro/rapid transit tunnel
- Tianshan Shengli Tunnel, 22.1 km long dual bore roadway at 4091 meters above the sea level
- Wushaoling Tunnel, 21 km long dual bore railway
- Zhongnanshan Tunnel, 18 km long dual bore roadway
- Fenghuoshan tunnel, at 5 km above sea level, the highest elevation rail tunnel in the world

== Colombia ==
- Tunel del Toyo (under construction) 9.84 km
- La Línea Tunnel 8.65 km
- Occidente Tunnel 4.6 km
- Buenavista Tunnel 4.6 km
- Sumapaz Tunnel 4.1 km
- Daza Tunnel 1.7 km
- Túnel Polvorín 1.6 km
- Girardota Tunnel 850 m
- La Llorona Tunnel 470 m
- Bijagual Tunnel 185 m
- Boquerón Tunnel 2.4 km
- Santa Rosa Tunnel 1.5 km
- Tunnel 5 1.6 km
- Tunnel 3 1.4 km
- Túnel Guacapate 1.2 km

== Denmark ==
- Great Belt Fixed Link, railway, 8.0 km
- Copenhagen Metro, metro rail, M2 line, 7,4 km (Fasanvej–Lergravsparken)
- Øresund Connection, road and rail, 4.05 km
- Boulevard Line, Copenhagen, railway, 1.8 km
- Limfjordstunnelen

== Egypt ==
- Ahmed Hamdi Tunnel, under the Suez Canal between Suez and Ismailia.

== Estonia ==
- Ülemiste Tunnel, road, 320 m

== Finland ==
- Raisiotunneli Raisio
- Myllyahde tunneli Turku
- Kehä II tunneli Kauniainen
- Korpilahti railway tunnel, near Jyväskylä
- Päijänne Water Tunnel, 1982
- Savio Rail Tunnel, 13.5 km, opened in 2008

== France ==
- Channel Tunnel to the United Kingdom (railway through the English Channel), at 50.5 km (31.4 mi)
- International Tunnel de Bielsa-Aragnouet France – Spain: total length 3.07 km, diameter 7.5 m, 100 m minimum distance between one after another vehicles, asphalt lane 6 m wide, for vehicles high max 4.3 m, max speed 60 km/h (37 mi/h)
- Fréjus Rail Tunnel
- Fréjus Road Tunnel
- Mont Blanc Tunnel
- Pont de l'Alma Tunnel (built under the River Sena – along its length, perpendicular to the length of the bridge, with reinforced concrete columns between the two traffic lanes, road: forbidden for pedestrians)
- Rove Tunnel, southern section of the Marseilles–Rhône Canal, 7.2 km (4.5 mi) long and 22 m (72 ft) wide, Bouches-du-Rhône dept., SE France; opened 1927. Starting near the village of Le Rove, it cuts through the Chaîne de l'Estaque at sea level. It is considered one of the greatest pieces of engineering since the Panama Canal. Longest canal tunnel in the world.
- Col de Tende Road Tunnel
- Col de Tende Rail Tunnel

== Georgia ==
- Roki Tunnel (3.73 km road)
- Rikoti Tunnel (1.72 km road)

== Germany ==
e.g.:

- Rennsteig Tunnel
- Engelberg Tunnel
- Old Elbe Tunnel
- New Elbe Tunnel

== Gibraltar ==
- Dudley Ward Tunnel

== Greece ==
Road tunnel in operation:

- Aktio–Preveza Undersea Tunnel (road), Connects Aktio and Preveza, under Aktion Channel, 1.20 km
- Artemisio Tunnel (road), double tunnel, under Mount Artemision, 1.40 km
- 76 tunnels of the A2 motorway (Egnatia Odos), most notably in parts of Epirus and Western Macedonia, combined length of 99 km, the longest of which are Driskos Tunnel 4.6 km, Metsovo Tunnel 3.5 km, Dodoni Tunnel 3.6 km, Kastania Tunnel 2.2 km, Anilio Tunnel 2.1 km
- Road Tunnels of E94 part Athens–Corinth, point Kakia Skala, combined length of 6 km

Road tunnel under construction:

- Tempe Tunnel
- Platamonas Tunnel

Railway tunnel in operation:

- Tempe Tunnel 5.5 km
- Platamonas Tunnel 4.3 km
- Perama Tunnel 3.5 km
- Kakia Skala Tunnel 2.4 km

Railway tunnel under construction:

- Kalidromos Tunnel
- Othrios Tunnel
- Domokos Tunnel
- Panagiopoulos Tunnel
- Aegio Tunnel

== Iceland ==
No metro, but some long road tunnels, including Hvalfjörður Tunnel at 5.8 km (3.6 mi) and some longer, and the longest (non-road) hydroelectric tunnel in Europe, one of the longest tunnels of any kind in the world, at Kárahnjúkar Hydropower Plant at 39.7 km (24.7 mi)

== India ==
- Dr. Syama Prasad Mookerjee Tunnel Longest Road Tunnel in India
- Atal Tunnel
- Banihal Qazigund Road Tunnel
- Pir Panjal Railway Tunnel (Banihal Tunnel)
- Maliguda Tunnel
- New Katraj Tunnel
- Punarjani Guha
- trivandrum port tunnel
- Jaipur Tunnel
- Kuthiran Tunnel
- Anakkampoyil-Kalladi-Meppadi tunnel
- Zoji-la Tunnel
- Sela Tunnel
- Victory Tunnel

== Indonesia ==
- Samarinda Tunnel

== Isle of Man ==
- Great Laxey Mine Railway tunnel

== Israel ==
- Carmel Tunnels
- Traffic Tunnels on road number 60 from Jerusalem to Gush Etzion
- Traffic Tunnels on road number 6 (crossing Israel)
- Railway tunnels (under construction) on new line Tel Aviv–Jerusalem
- Gaza Strip smuggling tunnels
- Siloam Tunnel
- Jerusalem Water Channel
- Western Wall Tunnel

== Italy ==
- Fréjus Rail Tunnel
- Fréjus Road Tunnel
- Mont Blanc Tunnel
- Traforo del Gran Sasso
- Great St Bernard Tunnel
- Simplon Tunnel
- Col de Tende Road Tunnel
- Col de Tende Rail Tunnel

== Japan ==
- Seikan Tunnel, 53.9 km (33.5 mi)

== Lithuania ==
- Kaunas Railway Tunnel
- Paneriai Railway Tunnel

== Luxembourg ==
- Gousselerbierg Tunnel
- Grouft Tunnel
- Markusbierg Tunnel
- René Konen Tunnel
- Stafelter Tunnel

== Macau ==
- Túnel do Monte da Guia
- Túnel da Colina de Taipa Grande
- Túnel do Canal da Taipa

== Malaysia ==
- SMART Tunnel – 3.3 km (highway); 9.7 km (water passage)
- Genting Sempah Tunnel – 900 m (highway)
- Larut Tunnel – 2.9 km (rail)
- Menora Tunnel – 800 m (highway)
- Penchala Tunnel – 700 m (highway)
- Kelana Jaya Line (light metro) – 2.9 km (underground rail section)
- Sungai Buloh–Kajang Line (light metro) – 9.5 km (underground rail section)
- Sungai Buloh–Serdang–Putrajaya Line (light metro) – 13.5 km (underground rail section)

== Montenegro ==
Road tunnels in operation

- Sozina Tunnel 4.19 km
- Ivica Tunnel 2.21 km
- Sutorman Tunnel 1.97 km (used as railway tunnel from 1908 to 1959, very narrow, only one car, rarely used)
- Vrmac Tunnel 1.64 km
- Lokve Tunnel 1.12 km
- Budoš Tunnel

Road tunnels under construction

- Vjeternik Tunnel 3.0/2.86 km (two tubes)
- Klisura Tunnel 2.81 km
- Kosman Tunnel 2.67/2.55 km (two tubes)
- Vežešnik Tunnel 2.47/2.41 km (two tubes)
- Mala Trava Tunnel 1.90/1.88 km (two tubes)
- Jabučki Krš Tunnel 1.46/1.36 km (two tubes)
- Ibarac Tunnel 1.19 km

Railway tunnels in operation

- Sozina Tunnel 6.17 km
- Trebješica Tunnel 5.17 km
- Mojkovac Tunnel 3.24 km
- Ostravica Tunnel 3.13 km
- Šljivovica Tunnel 2.20 km

== Morocco ==
- Tunnel du Legionaire

== Nepal ==
- Nagdhunga tunnel 2.63 km

== North Macedonia ==
- Bukovik Tunnel, railway, 7.05 km
- veles tunnel 500 m
- veles tunnel 300 m
- demir kapija tunnel 800 m

== Panama ==
- Las Esclavas Tunnel

== Pakistan ==
Road tunnels in operation

- Attabad Tunnels, on N-35 Karakoram Highway is a series of five tunnels in Gilgit-Baltistan
- Abbottabad Tunnels on Hazara Motorway M-15
- Kohat Tunnel on N55 Indus Highway
- Lowari Tunnel on N-45 Nowshera-Chitral Highway
- Malakand Tunnel on N-45 Nowshera–Chitral Highway
- Nahakki Tunnel is a tunnel from Peshawar to Mohmand Agency via Bajaur
- Neelum–Jhelum Hydropower Tunnel
- Swat Tunnel on Nowshera–Swat Expressway
- Quetta Tunnel at the entrance of Quetta on N-25 National Highway near Lak Pass.

Railway tunnels in operation

- Khojak Tunnel, is a railway tunnel connecting Rohri with Chaman
- Lahore Metro Orange Line Tunnel in Lahore

== Philippines ==
- Subic Tunnel (road)
- Marcos Highway Tunnel (road)
- Antipolo Tunnel (road)
- Cebu tunnel (road)
- Purle line tunnel (rail)

== Poland ==
- "Tunel" ("the Tunnel"), 813 m, on the Warsaw–Kielce–Kraków line, between Sędziszów and Słomniki
- Wałbrzych–Jedlina, 1.60 km, rail
- Warsaw Metro rail
- Warsaw Cross-City Line, 2.31 km, rail
- Warsaw, road city tunnel (Wisłostrada), 930 m southbound, 889 m northbound
- Martwa Wisła Tunnel, 1.38km, road
- Laliki, road mountain tunnel, 678 m, Tunel_Emilia
- Kraków, road city tunnel, 230 m, Tunel_Rafała_Kalinowskiego_w_Krakowie
- Kraków, tram city tunnel, 1.42 km, Tunel_Krakowskiego_Szybkiego_Tramwaju

== Puerto Rico ==
- Minillas Tunnel
- Vicente Morales Tunnel

== Romania ==
- Teliu Rail Tunnel 4.37 km
- Talasmani Rail Tunnel 3.33 km
- Pasul Şetref Rail Tunnel 2.39 km
- Curtea de Arges Tunnel, 1.35 km, A1 motorway (Romania)
- Danes Rail Tunnel 969 m
- Capra-Bâlea Road Tunnel, 884 m (connects the historic regions of Transylvania and Wallachia), Transfăgărășan
- Sighisoara Rail Tunnel 401 m
- Sacel Highway Tunnel, 340 m, A1 motorway (Romania)
- Transfagarasan KM 60 Tunnel, 172 m, Transfăgărășan

== Russia ==
- Severomuysky Tunnel (15.34 km), Buryatia
- Baikal (Daban) tunnel (6.69 km), Irkutsk Oblast
- Gimry tunnel (4.30 km), Dagestan
- Lefortovo tunnel, 3.2 km, Moscow
- North-Western Tunnel, 2.8 km, Moscow

== Singapore ==
- Mass Rapid Transit (Singapore)
- Chin Swee Tunnel
- Kampong Java Tunnel
- Kallang–Paya Lebar Expressway
- Fort Canning Tunnel
- Marina Coastal Expressway

== Slovenia ==
- Dekani Tunnel – 2.18/2.19 km, A1 road
- Golovec Tunnel – 530/595 m, A1 road/E57 road
- Kastelec Tunnel – 2.29/2.24 km, A1 road
- Karawanks Tunnel (Karawanken Tunnel) – 7.86 km, A2 road/E61 road
- Trojane Tunnel – 2.84/2.93 m, A1/E57 road
- Šentvid Tunnel – 1.07/1.05 m, A2/E61 road
- Bohinj Tunnel – 6.33 km, rail tunnel on the way Jesenice – Nova Gorica
- Tunnels on the Slovenian motorways

== Switzerland ==
- Gotthard Base Tunnel, 57.09 km (35.5 mi) railway tunnel through the Alps

== Taiwan ==
- Baguashan Tunnel (Provincial Highway No. 76)
- Baguashan Tunnel (Taiwan High Speed Railway)
- Central Tunnel (South-link line)
- Hsuehshan Tunnel (National Highway No. 5)
- Xinguanyin Tunnel (North-link line)
- Yuchang Tunnel (Yuchang Highway)
- Taipei Metro
- Kaohsiung Mass Rapid Transit

== Tanzania ==
- TAZARA Railway – 22 tunnels; 1.5 mi (2.4 km)

== Thailand ==
- Chong Khao Tunnel (235.90 m rail tunnel on Southern line in Nakhon Si Thammarat province)
- Huai Mae Lan Tunnel (130.20 m rail tunnel on Northern line in Phrae province)
- Khao Phang Hoei Tunnel (230.60 m rail tunnel on Northeastern line in Lopburi and Chaiyaphum provinces)
- Khao Phlueng Tunnel (362.44 m rail tunnel on Northern line in Uttaradit and Phrae provinces)
- Khun Tan Tunnel (1362.10 m rail tunnel on Northern line in Lampang and Lamphun provinces)
- Mongkolrit Tunnel (268 m road tunnel in Betong, Yala province)
- Pang Tup Khop Tunnel (120.09 m rail tunnel on Northern line in Uttaradit province)
- Phra Phutthachai Tunnel (1.20 km rail tunnel on freight-only Eastern line in Saraburi province)
- Mae Taeng–Mae Ngat–Mae Kuang Diversion Tunnel 23 km (waterway) underconstruction
- MRT Blue Line 25.8 km (underground rail section)
- MRT Orange Line 13.8 km (underground rail section) – underconstruction
- Khao Yai – Thap Lan Tunnel (250 m and 180 m road tunnel, total of 430 m in Prachinburi Province, for wildlife overpass)

== United Arab Emirates ==
- Airport Tunnel, Dubai (road)
- Al Shindagha Tunnel, Dubai (road)
- Wadi Al Helo Tunnel (between Sharjah – Kalba approximately 1.6 km)

== United Kingdom ==
- Channel Tunnel to France (railway through the English Channel), at 50.5 km (31.4 mi)

== Vietnam ==
- Hải Vân Tunnel, the longest tunnel in Southeast Asia at 6.28 km (3.90 mi).
- Sài Gòn River Tunnel
- Cu Chi Tunnels

== Zambia ==
- TAZARA Railway – 22 tunnels; longest 1.5 mi (2.4 km)

== See also ==
- World's longest tunnels
- List of tunnels in the Alps
