= Provincial Highway 30 (Taiwan) =

Provincial highway in Taiwan

Provincial Highway 30
- 台30線
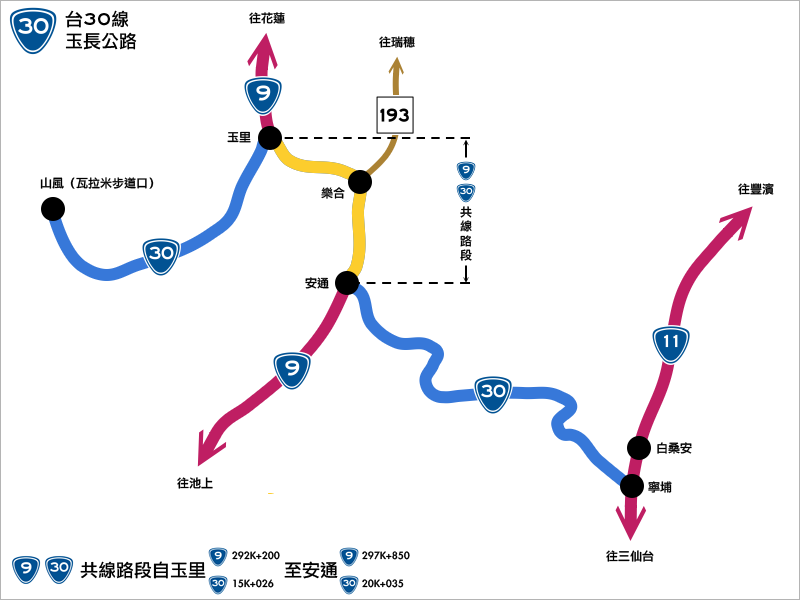

Route information
- Maintained by Directorate General of Highways
- Length: 35.433 km (22.017 mi)

Major junctions
- West end: Zhuoxi, Hualien
- East end: Prov 11 in Changbin, Taitung

Location
- Country: Taiwan

Highway system
- Highway system in Taiwan
← Prov 29	→ Prov 31

Provincial Highway 30 (Chinese: 台30線) is a 35.433-kilometer highway, which starts from Zhuoxi, Hualien and ends in Changbin, Taitung. This highway passes through Hai'an Range from the Pacific coast to the Huatung Valley and connects Provincial Highway No.11 and Provincial Highway No.9.

Section:Yuchang Highway: Yuli, Hualien - Changbin, Taitung.

== See also ==
- Highway system in Taiwan
