= Yuchang Highway =

Highway in Taiwan

Yuchang Highway is a section of Provincial Highway 30, started from Yuli, Hualien and ended in Changbin, Taitung. This highway passes through Hai'an Range from pacific coast to Huatung Valley.

The Yuchang Tunnel passes Hai'an Range and its length is 2660 metres.
