= Taiyuan Basin =

Basin in Taiwan

The Taiyuan Basin (Chinese: 泰源盆地; pinyin: Tàiyuán Péndì) is located around the southern tail of the Hai'an Range in eastern Taiwan. The entire basin is located in the Dunghe Township of Taitung County. It is the traditional territory of the indigenous Amis. There is an archaeological site named Taiyuan site (泰源遺址) in the basin, which is a part of the Cilin Culture (麒麟文化).
