= North-Western Tunnel =

Tunnel in Moscow, Russia

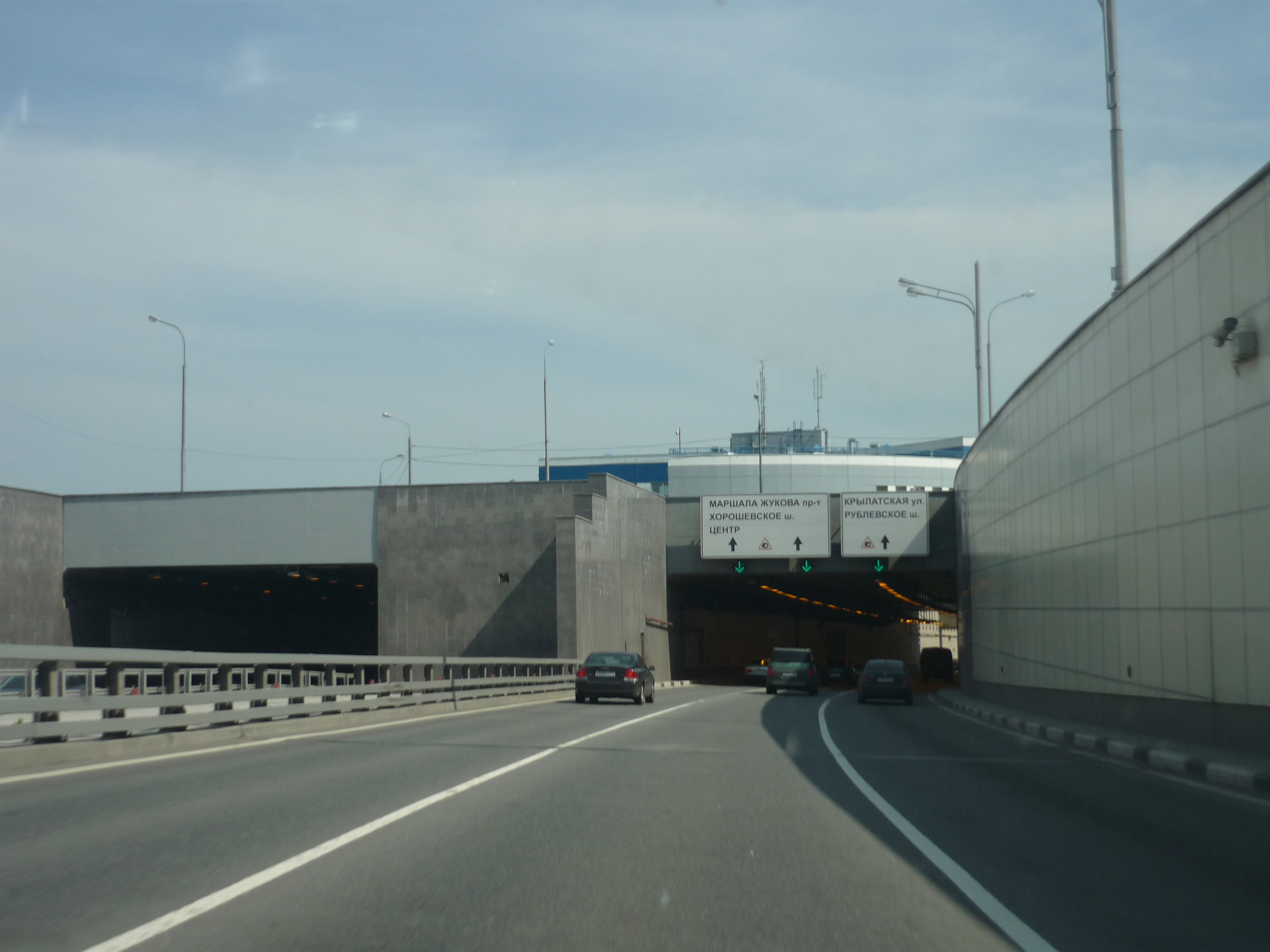
- Interactive map of North-Western Tunnel

Overview
- Location: Serebryany bor forest, Moscow, Russia
- Coordinates: 55°46′37.75″N 37°23′54.88″E
- Route: M9 motorway Arbatsko-Pokrovskaya Metro Line

Operation
- Opened: December 27, 2007; 18 years ago
- Traffic: Automotive, rail
- Character: Highway, subway

North-Western Tunnel (Russian: Северо-Западный тоннель) is a road and metro tunnel in Moscow, Russia. It forms part of the Krasnopresnensky prospekt, which connects the M9 motorway with central Moscow, and carries the Arbatsko-Pokrovskaya Line beneath the area. It is about 2.8 km (1.7 mi) long and is the fourth longest in-city tunnel of Europe (after the Dublin Port Tunnel at 4.5 km, the Södra länken in Stockholm at 4.5 km and Giovanni XXIII Tunnel in Rome at 2.9 km).

It runs under the Serebryany bor forest. The double-level tunnel combines the road and railway traffic.

The tunnel was opened on December 27, 2007.

== See also ==
- Zhivopisny Bridge (another part of the Krasnopresnensky prospekt)
