= Wisłoujście (ferry) =

River ferry in Gdańsk

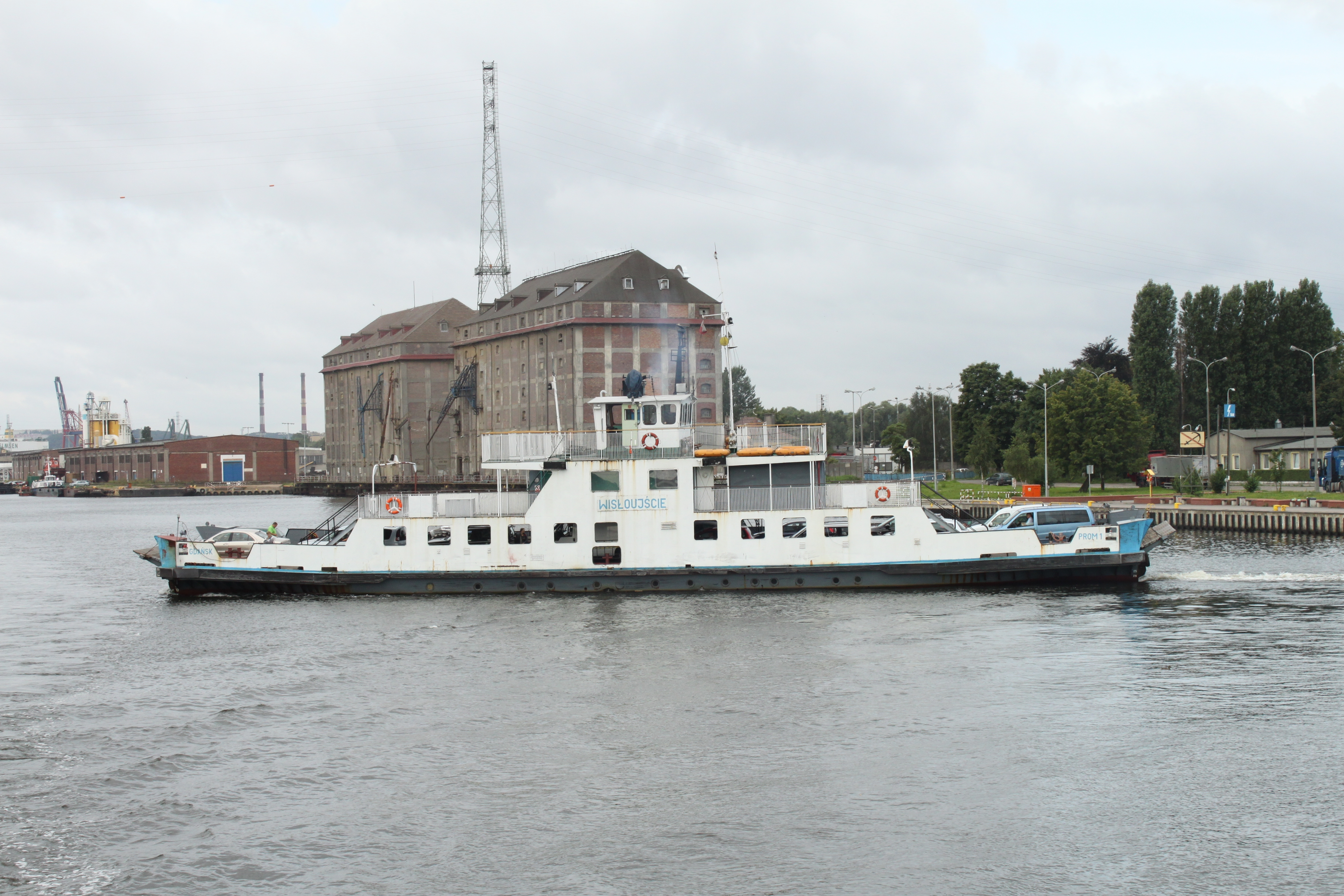
- Wisłoujście in 2010

History
- Owner: Maritime Port Administration (1977–2012); Gdańsk city government (2012–2016)
- Operator: Żegluga Gdańska (1977–1992); Prom Wisłoujście Usługi Żeglugowe i Elektryczne (1992–2016)
- Route: Nowy Port – Wisłoujście Fortress
- Builder: Planned by Navicentrum Shipyard, Wrocław; Built in Kędzierzyn-Koźle; Outfitted at Oder River Shipyard, Szczecin
- Maiden voyage: 4 January 1977
- Out of service: 31 June 2016
- Fate: Scrapped, 2016

General characteristics
- Tonnage: 290 GT
- Length: 42 m (137 ft 10 in)
- Beam: 8.8 m (28 ft 10 in)
- Capacity: 20 cars; 100 passengers
- Crew: 15

Wisłoujście was a ferry that sailed on the Martwa Wisła in Gdańsk, between Nowy Port and Wisłoujście Fortress, from 1977 to 2016. She was eventually replaced by the Martwa Wisła Tunnel in 2016 and scrapped the same year.

== Specifications ==
Wisłoujście was a double-ended ferry, with rudders both at the stern and bow. She measured 42 metres (137 ft 10 in) in length and had a beam of 8.8 metres (28 ft 10 in). She initially had a capacity for 16 cars and 60 passengers, which was later increased to 20 cars and 100 passengers. Her crew consisted of 15 members working two shifts, and she could cross the Martwa Wisła within five minutes.

== Career ==
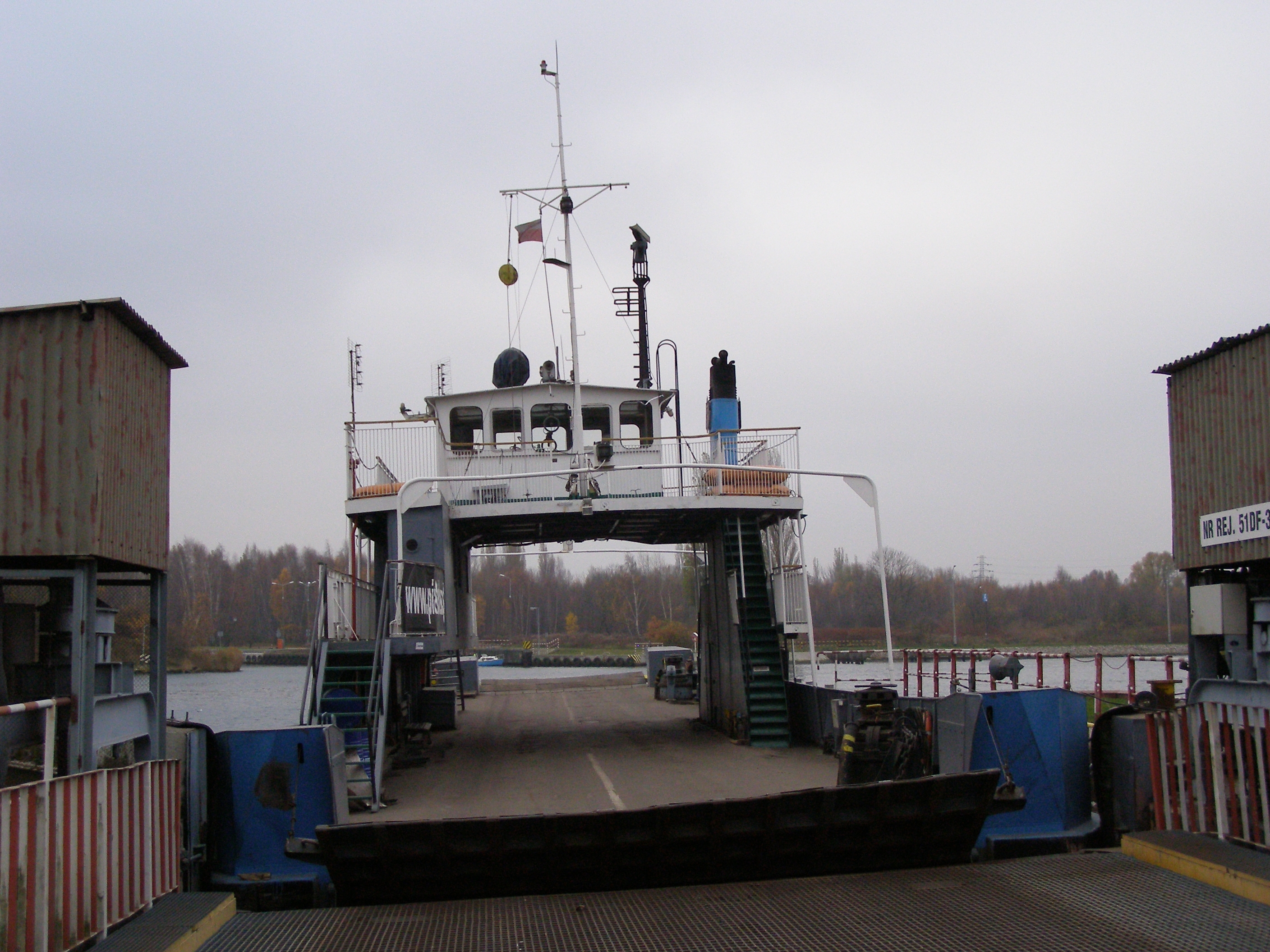
Wisłoujście while docked

=== Background ===
The history of the ferry route across the Martwa Wisła that Wisłoujście operated on goes back to the 14th century, when, among other privileges, the State of the Teutonic Order permitted the Oliwa Abbey to organize river crossings for an inn the latter operated. This ferry service would continue being served through the next centuries by various ships, most of which were cable ferries.

=== Construction and career ===
Wisłoujście was constructed in Kędzierzyn-Koźle in accordance with the plans of the Navicentrum Shipyard in Wrocław and outfitted at the Oder River Shipyard (Polish: Stocznia Rzeczna Odra) in Szczecin. She arrived at Gdańsk on 5 January 1976 and embarked on her maiden voyage on 4 January 1977. She was initially meant to sail across the Przekop Wisły, between Świbno and Mikoszewo. Custom-built docks were constructed for her at her two mooring locations, in Nowy Port and near the Wisłoujście Fortress.

The ferry was financed by the local Maritime Port Administration (Polish: Zarząd Portu Morskiego) and operated by Żegluga Gdańska, a shipping company which was state-owned until 1989; after the post-communist privatization of state-owned enterprises occurred, the company stopped operating her in 1993. Andrzej Pieńkowski, a local businessman, then bought the ferry, forming a new company, Prom Wisłoujście Usługi Żeglugowe i Elektryczne, which operated Wisłoujście.

In 2012, the Maritime Port Administration ceased funding the ferry, and she was directly financed by the Gdańsk city government from then on. For much of her service life, the ship tended to be crowded with a significant amount of passengers during her crossings.

=== Retirement and scrapping ===
In April 2016, after several years of construction and delays, the Martwa Wisła Tunnel, a tunnel connecting the two sides of the river by road, was completed. This made Wisłoujście redundant, with passenger numbers dropping as much as 90%. This was criticized, as it made crossing the Martwa Wisła more difficult for pedestrians and cyclists, because these groups could board Wisłoujście and thus cross the river aboard her, whereas the tunnel was designed only for cars.

On 31 May 2016, Wisłoujście crossed the Martwa Wisła for the final time in a publicized event, with 55 passengers aboard. In June, she was put up for sale, but was not bought and was eventually scrapped at Gdańsk in August and September 2016.

== See also ==
- Motława (ship)
