= Gosseldange =

Town in Luxembourg

Coordinates: 49°44′N 6°07′E

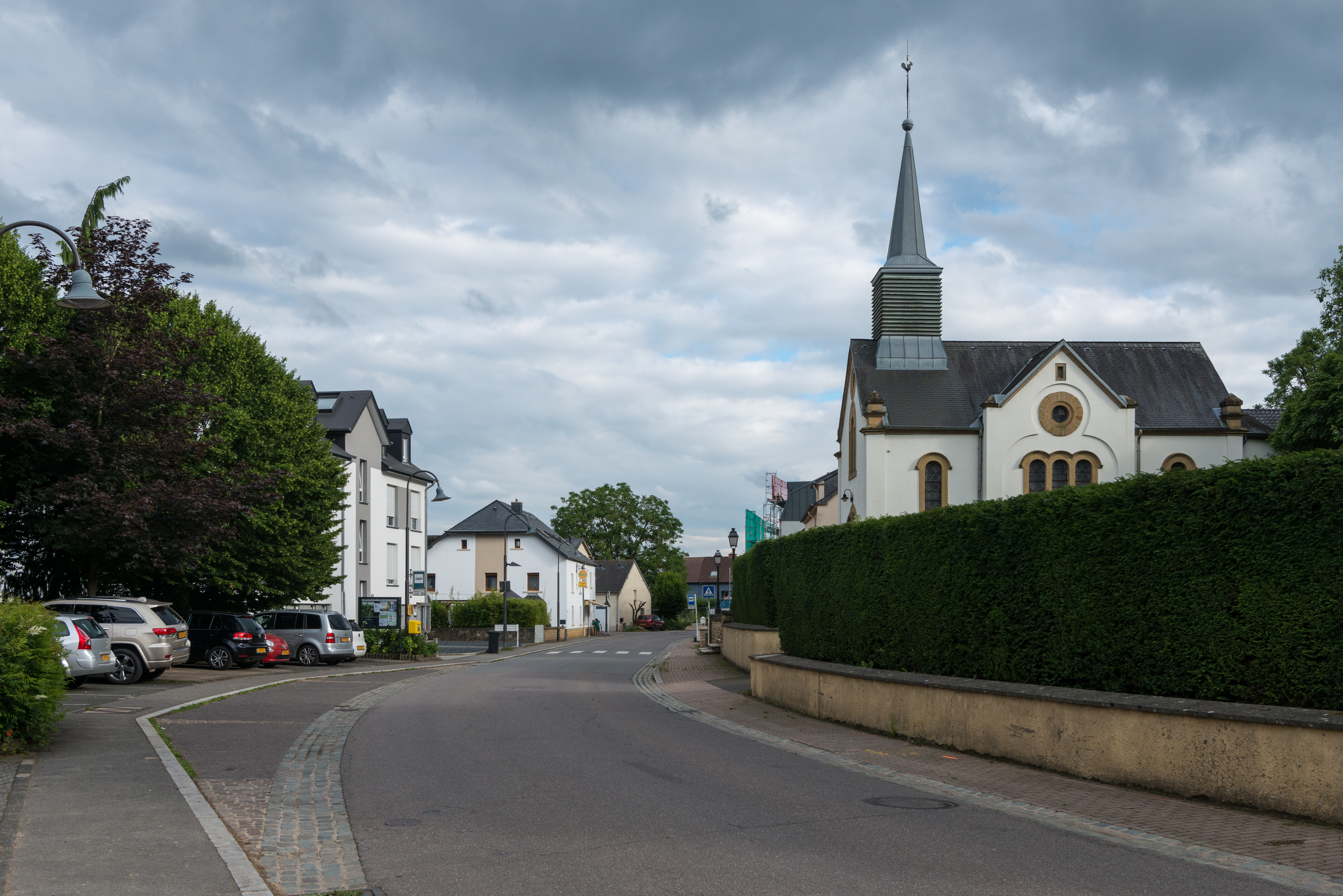
Route de Mersch, Gosseldange

Gosseldange (Luxembourgish: Gousseldeng, German: Gosseldingen) is a small town in the commune of Lintgen, in central Luxembourg. As of September 2026, the town has a population of 738.

Near to the town of Gosseldange is the Gousselerbierg, under which passes the Gousselerbierg Tunnel, the second-longest tunnel in Luxembourg.
