= Baxian Caves =

Cave in Changbin, Taitung County, Taiwan

- 八仙洞
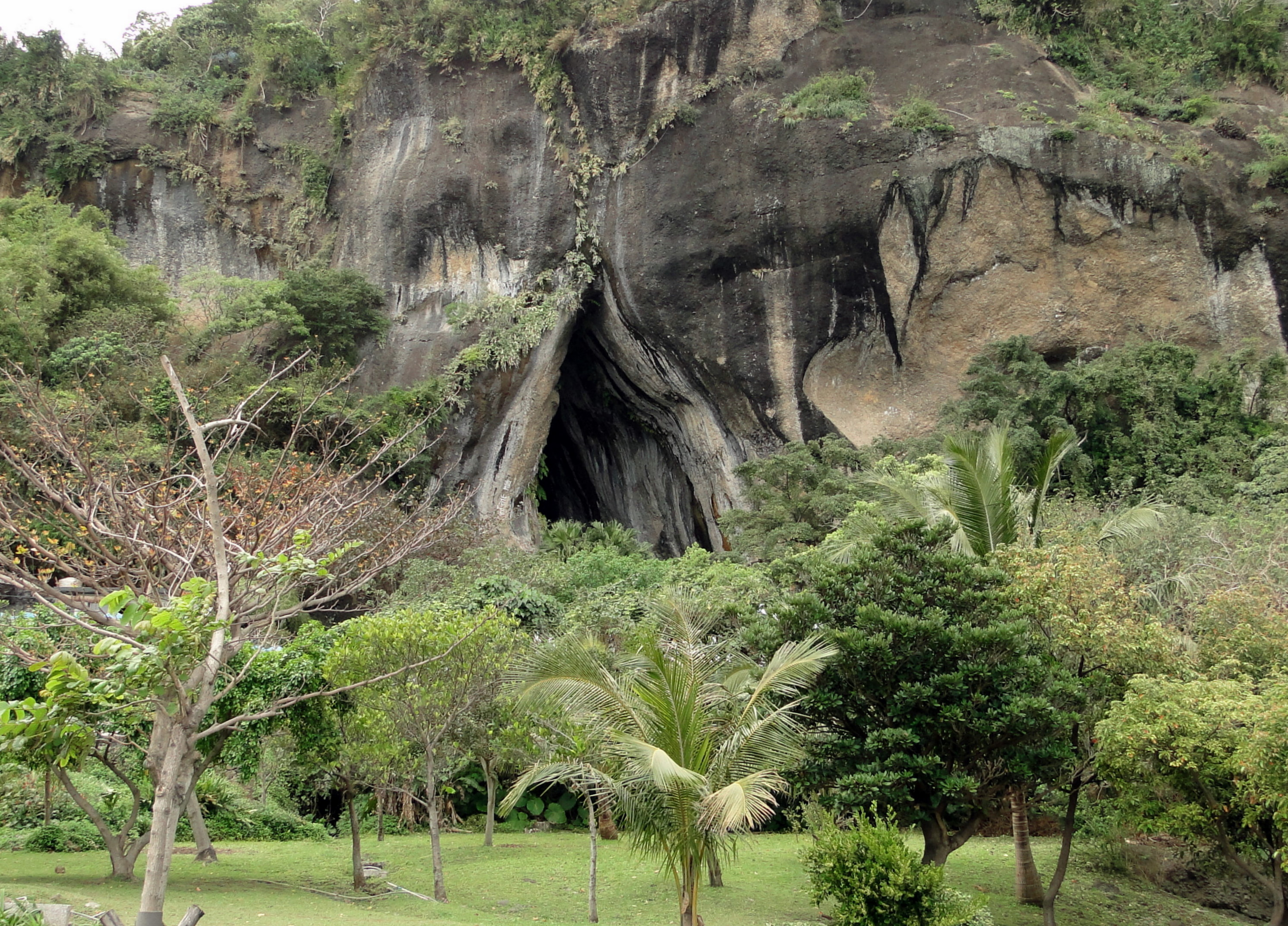

- Location within Taitung County
- Location: Changbin, Taitung County, Taiwan
- Coordinates: 23°23′47″N 121°28′37″E
- Geology: Sea cave

Baxian Caves (Chinese: 八仙洞; pinyin: Bāxiān Dòng) are sea caves located in the east coast of Changbin Township, Taitung County, Taiwan.

== History ==
Recently, the caves have been occupied and used as temples or places to place cremation ashes. However, since 10 years ago, the Cultural Heritage Preservation Act was promulgated, subsequently the Taitung County Government, East Coast National Scenic Area and Changbin Township Office had been trying to take over the caves. On 22 November 2017, they finally managed to take back the last cave and completed the reclamation of all 30 caves in the area. The earliest evidence of human habitation in Taiwan was found at the Baxian Caves with Paleolithic stone tools dated to around 30,000 year ago.

== Geology ==
Baxian Cave possesses a distinctive eroded look and is famous for ruins dating from the Old Stone Age. There are 10-plus caves on the 100 metres (328 ft) high precipice, each of a different size and depth. Originally the caverns were below sea level, allowing waves to shape them, but now they are located on a high cliff—proof of the East Coast's changing surface.

== See also ==
- Geography of Taiwan
