= Gousselerbierg Tunnel =

Road tunnel in Luxembourg

Coordinates: 49°42′33″N 6°07′07″E

The Gousselerbierg Tunnel is a pair of parallel road tunnels in the canton of Mersch, in central Luxembourg. The tunnels are named for the hill through which they pass, near the town of Gosseldange, in the commune of Lintgen. At 2,695 metres (8,842 ft), the Gousselerbierg Tunnel is the second-longest tunnel in the country, after the Grouft Tunnel, at 2,950 metres (9,678 ft).

The tunnel carries the A7 motorway, and is the first of three major tunnels on the route of the road, together with the Grouft Tunnel and the Stafelter Tunnel (1,850 m). Each of the twin tunnels contains two lanes of traffic in one direction. At its maximum, the tunnel lies 115 metres (377 ft) below the surface of the hill.

The tunnel was constructed using the New Austrian Tunnelling method, relying on the stress of the surrounding rock to stabilise the tunnel. Preparatory work on the tunnel began on 17 April 2000, and drilling work began on 21 November of the same year. The breakthrough ceremony was held on 12 December 2002, with Grand Duke Henri detonating the explosive charge that connected the two ends of the tunnels. Altogether, the tunnel cost €100m to construct, and 420,000 m³ (14.8m cu ft) of earth were excavated, 65% of which was removed by explosives.
