= Zhuoxi =

Zhuoxi Township 卓溪鄉 Jhuosi
- Mountain indigenous township
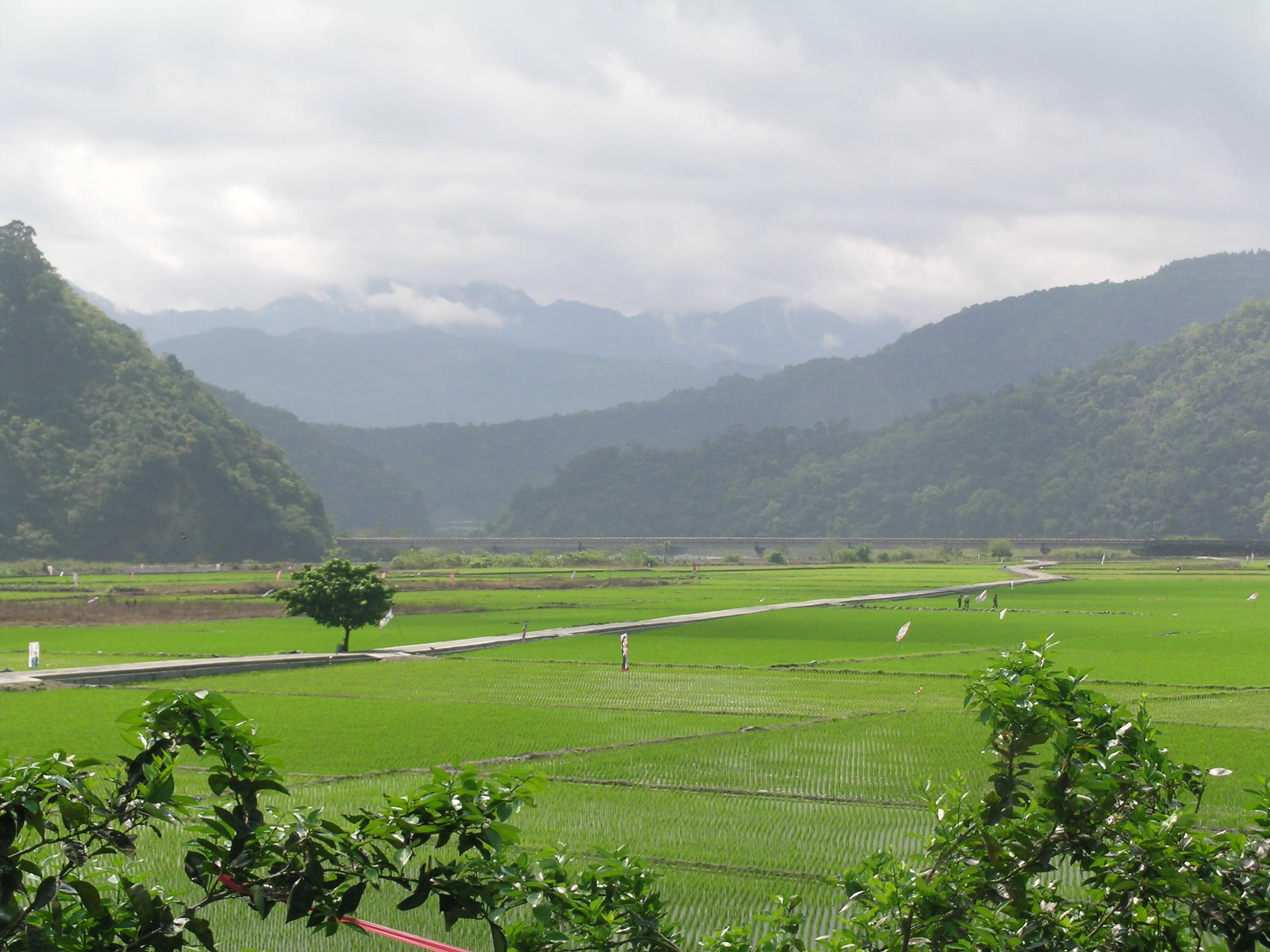

- Coordinates: 23°20′00″N 121°17′00″E
- Country: Taiwan
- Region: Eastern Taiwan

Government
  - Type: Township

Area
  - Total: 1,021.3130 km^{2} (394.3312 sq mi)

Population (February 2023)
  - Total: 6,043
- Time zone: UTC+8 (CST)
- Post code: 982
- Subdivision: 6 Villages
- Website: www.zhuo-xi.gov.tw

Zhuoxi Township (Chinese: 卓溪鄉; pinyin: Zhuóxī Xiāng) is a mountain indigenous township in Hualien County, Taiwan, bisected by the Tropic of Cancer. It lies on the Central Mountain Range (up to 95% of its area) with steep mountains which makes it the highest township in the county. The population is 6,046 inhabitants, including Bunun people, Truku people and Seediq people. The main economic activity is agriculture.

== Administrative divisions ==
The township comprises six villages: Gufeng, Lishan, Lunshan, Taiping, Zhuoqing and Zhuoxi.

== Tourist attractions ==
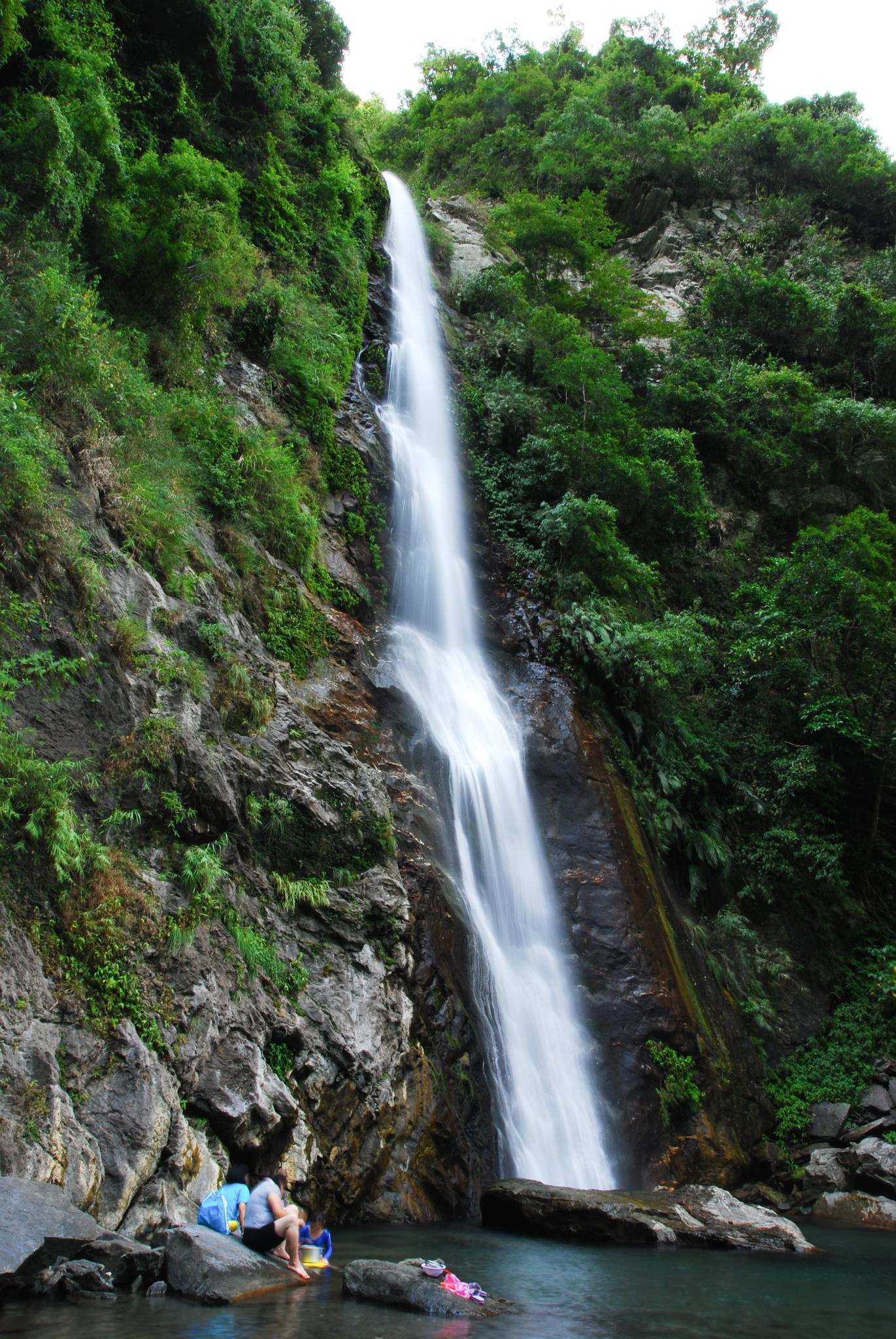
Nan'an Waterfall

- East Rift Valley National Scenic Park
- Luntian Recreation Area
- Nan'an Waterfall
- Walami Hiking Trail
- Yushan National Park

== Transportation ==
- Provincial Highway 30
