= Yuchang Tunnel =

Tunnel in Taiwan

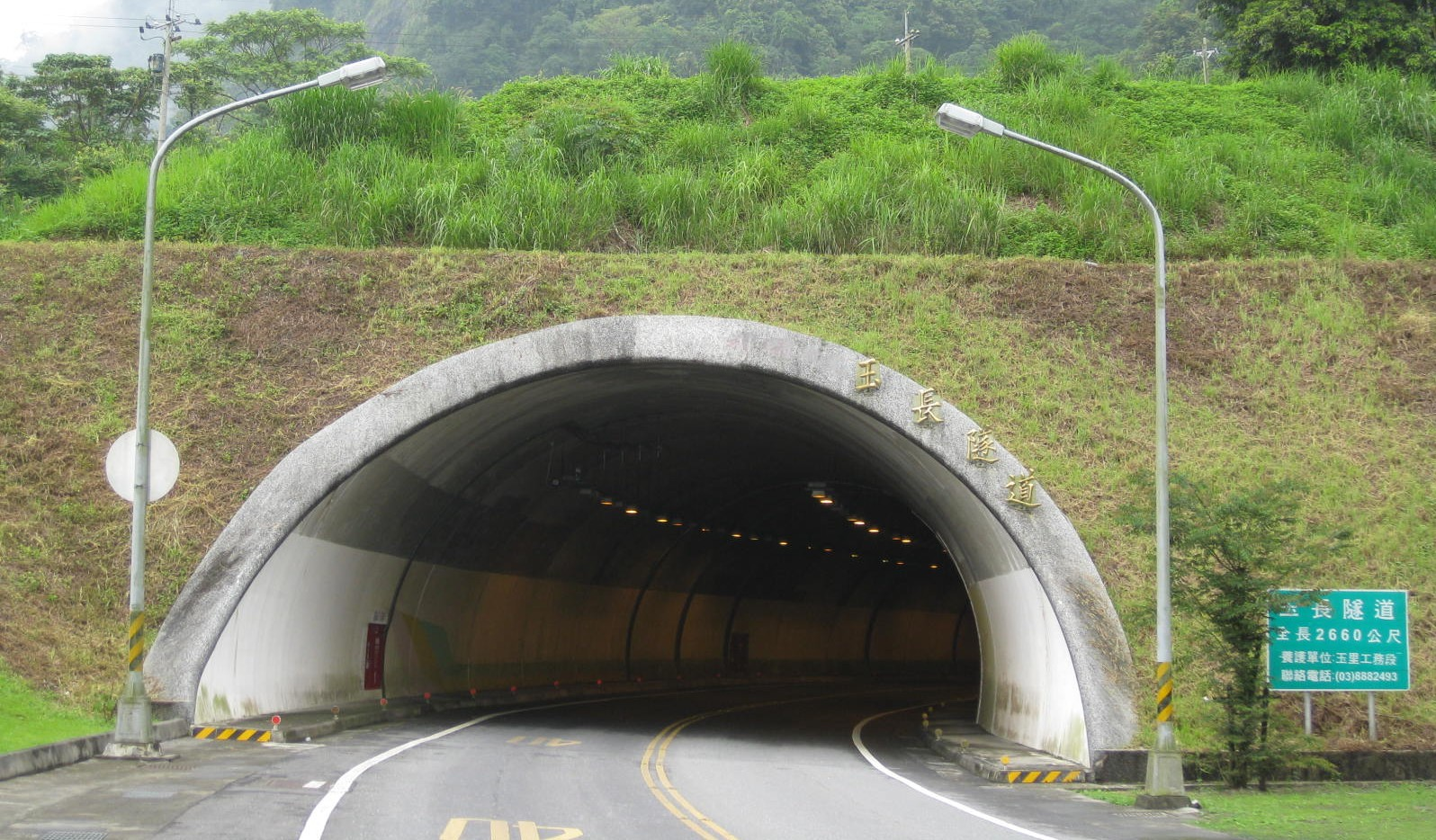
- Interactive map of Yuchang Tunnel

Overview
- Official name: 玉長隧道
- Location: Hualien County and Taitung County in Taiwan
- Route: Yuchang Highway
- Crosses: Hai'an Range

Operation
- Work began: 1 September 2001
- Opened: 16 June 2007

Technical
- Length: 2,660 m (8,730 ft)
- No. of lanes: 2

The Yuchang Tunnel (Chinese: 玉長隧道; pinyin: Yùcháng Suìdào) is a 2,660 m (1.653 mi) long tunnel located in east Taiwan. The tunnel leads through the Coastal Range. The tunnel is part of the Yuchang Highway, which links Hualien County and Taitung County. The western entrance of the tunnel is located at 23.2687°N 121.364°E, and the eastern entrance is at 23.2644°N 121.387°E

== History ==
It is started construction on 1 September 2001 and was opened to the public on 16 June 2007.

== See also ==
- Transportation in Taiwan
