= Giovanni XXIII Tunnel =

Road tunnel in Rome, Italy

Coordinates: 41.9410°N 12.4496°E

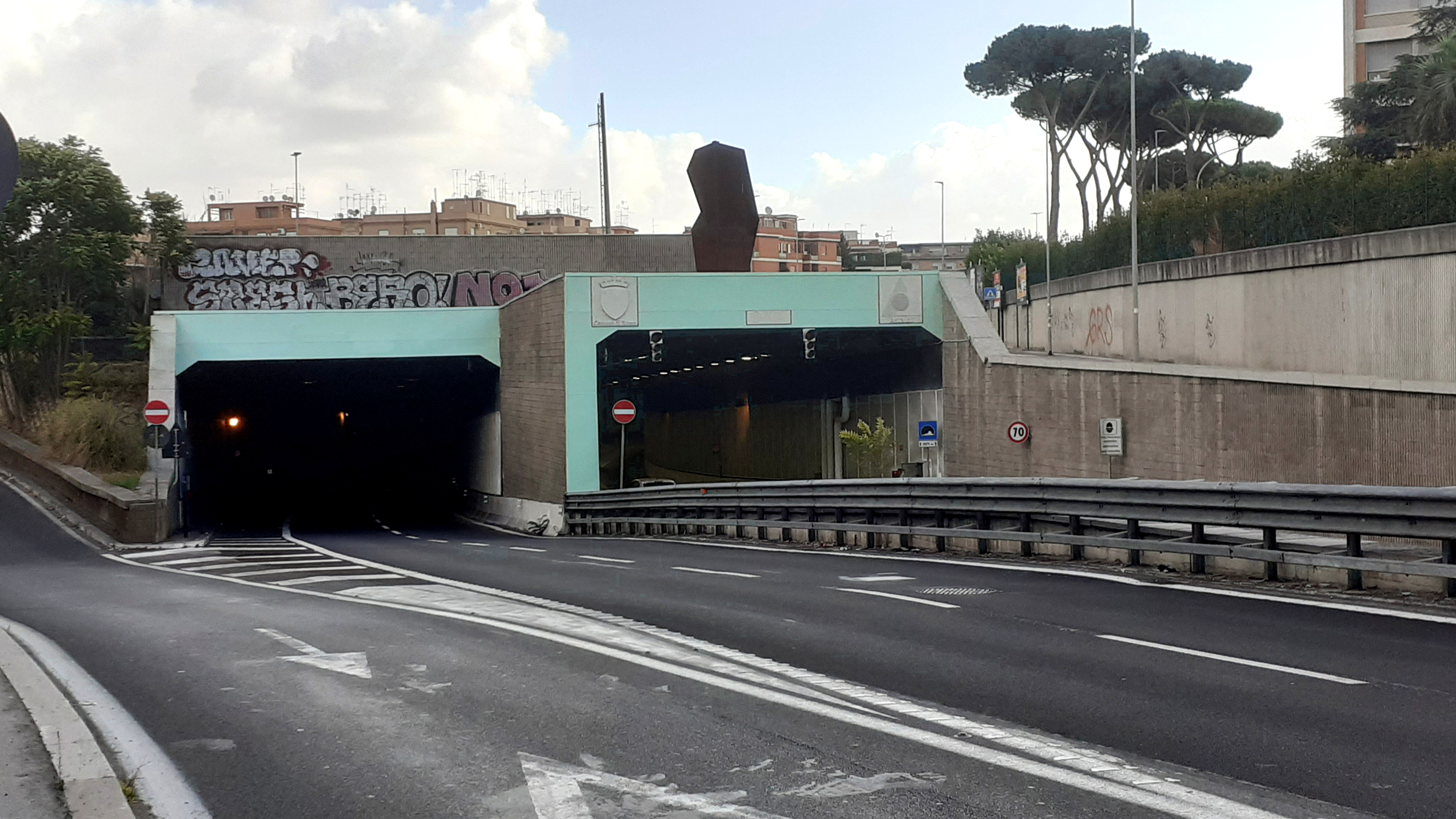
The western end of the tunnel

Giovanni XXIII Tunnel (also called Passante a Nord-Ovest) is a road tunnel in Rome, Italy, that is part of the Tangenziale Est road. It is about 2.9 km (1.8 mi) long.

The twin tunnels form a dual carriageway running under the Monte Mario hill, connecting the northwest zone to northeast zone of Rome.

The tunnel was officially opened on 22 December 2004.

During the construction, ostracod fossils were discovered.

The tunnel is toll-free.
