= Martwa Wisła Tunnel =

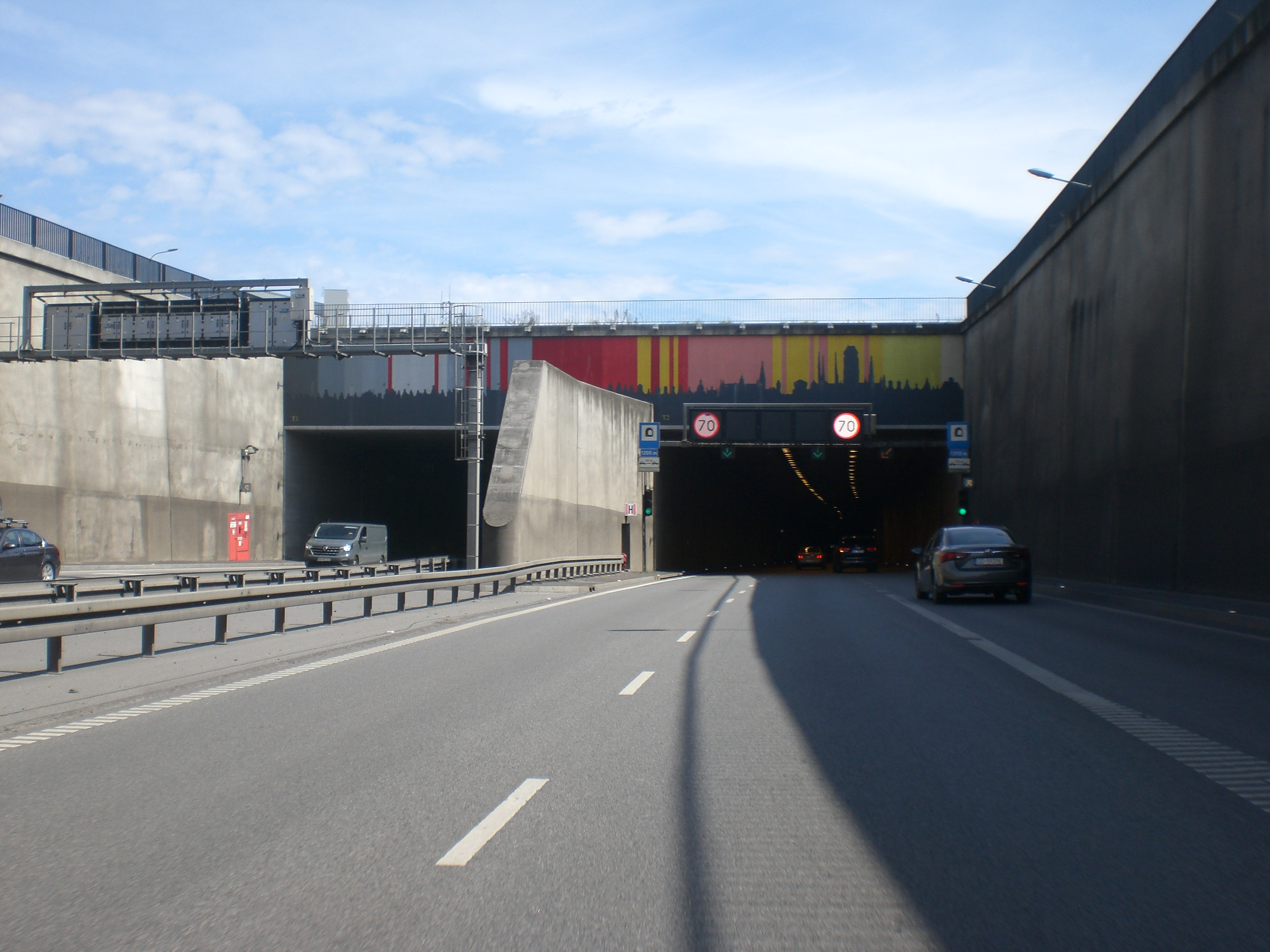
- One of the two entrances to the tunnel

Overview
- Official name: Tunel im. Ks. Abp. Tadeusza Gocłowskiego
- Location: Gdańsk
- Coordinates: 54.3836°N 18.6614°E
- Start: Letnica
- End: Przeróbka

Operation
- Work began: 29 May 2013
- Opened: 24 April 2016

Technical
- Length: 1.38 kilometres (0.86 mi)

The Martwa Wisła Tunnel (Polish: Tunel pod Martwą Wisłą), officially the Father Archbishop Tadeusz Gocłowski Tunnel (Polish: Tunel im. Ks. Abp. Tadeusza Gocłowskiego), named after Tadeusz Gocłowski, is a road tunnel below the Martwa Wisła in Gdańsk, Poland.

== Construction history ==
The tunnel was bored using a tunnel boring machine (TBM) built by Herrenknecht in the German town of Schwanau. It was nicknamed Damroka, and with a shield measuring 12.6 metres (41 ft), it was the largest such machine that had been used in Poland up to that point.

Tunnel boring began on 29 May 2013. The tunnel consists of two bores; the southern was the first to be created. The TBM began boring on the eastern side of the Martwa Wisła, eventually emerging on the western side in Letnica, and was then transported back to the eastern side to create the northern bore. The deadline for completion was initially scheduled for October 2014, but was progressively delayed to April 2016.

On 19 October 2014, the inhabitants of Gdańsk were given an opportunity to visit the tunnel and walk from Letnica to the tunnel's other end in Przeróbka. On 23 April 2016, cyclists, runners, and pedestrians were once again allowed to freely walk through the tunnel, now being allowed to move in both directions. On 24 April, the tunnel was opened to car traffic. On 16 September 2016, the tunnel's patron became Archbishop Tadeusz Gocłowski.

As of 2017, the tunnel handled 720,000 cars per month. In accordance with past promises made by the city government, every year, on the third Sunday of April, the tunnel is closed to cars and opened to cyclists. The tunnel replaced the Wisłoujście, a ferry which had crossed the Martwa Wisła since 1977, resulting in the latter's retirement and later scrapping.

== Finances ==
Constructing the tunnel was more expensive than the theoretical construction of a bridge to span the Martwa Wisła, but such a bridge was not built, as the waterway connects Gdańsk Bay to the shipyards of Gdańsk. The cheapest option for boring the tunnel cost 885 million zł, leading to a lengthy series of disputes that concluded with the final decision being made in September 2011. The cost of the investment totalled 1.45 billion zł, with the company carrying out the tunnelling work being the Spanish Obrascón Huarte Lain.

== Gallery ==
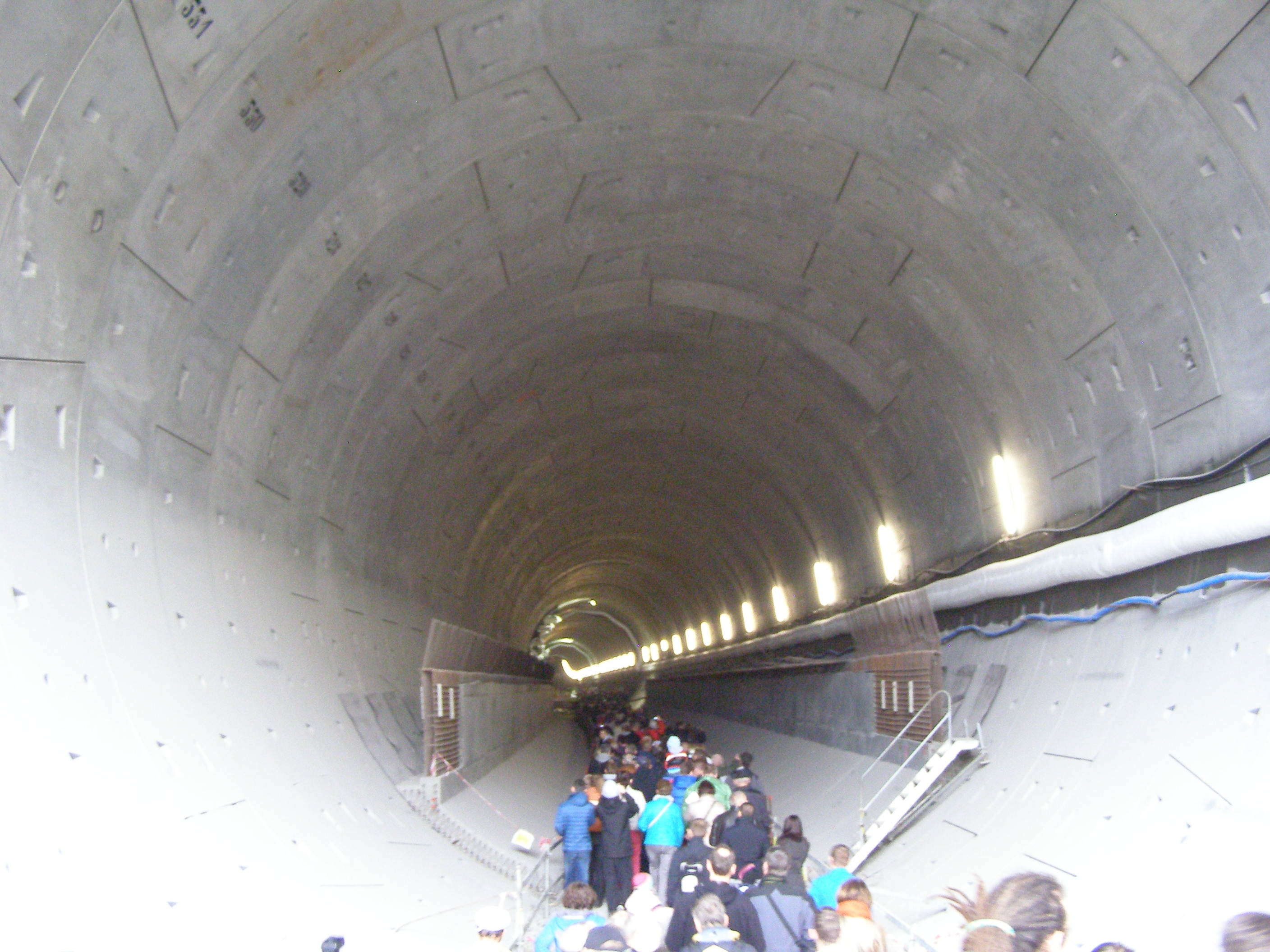
Visitors entering the tunnel, 2014

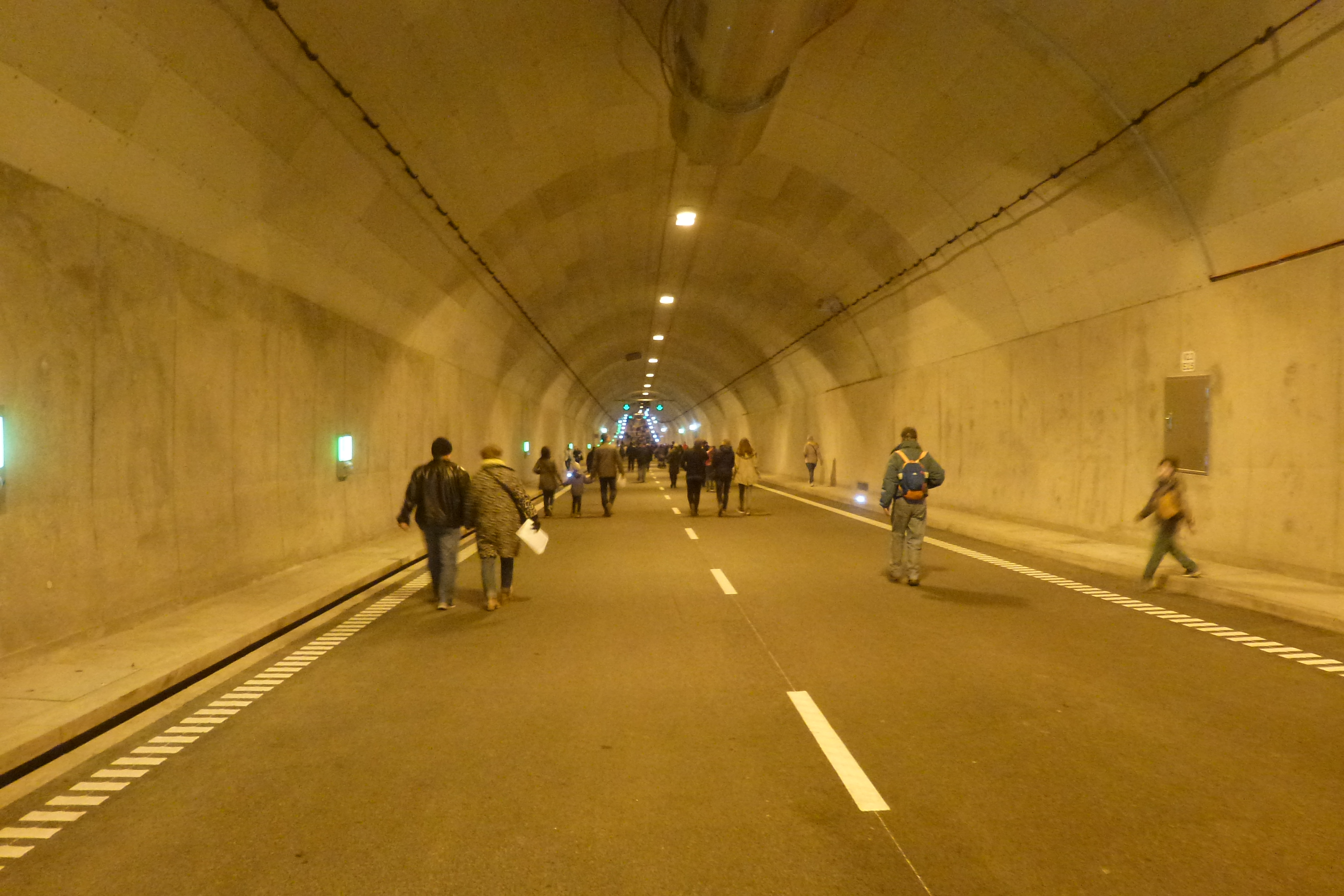
The finished tunnel, 2016

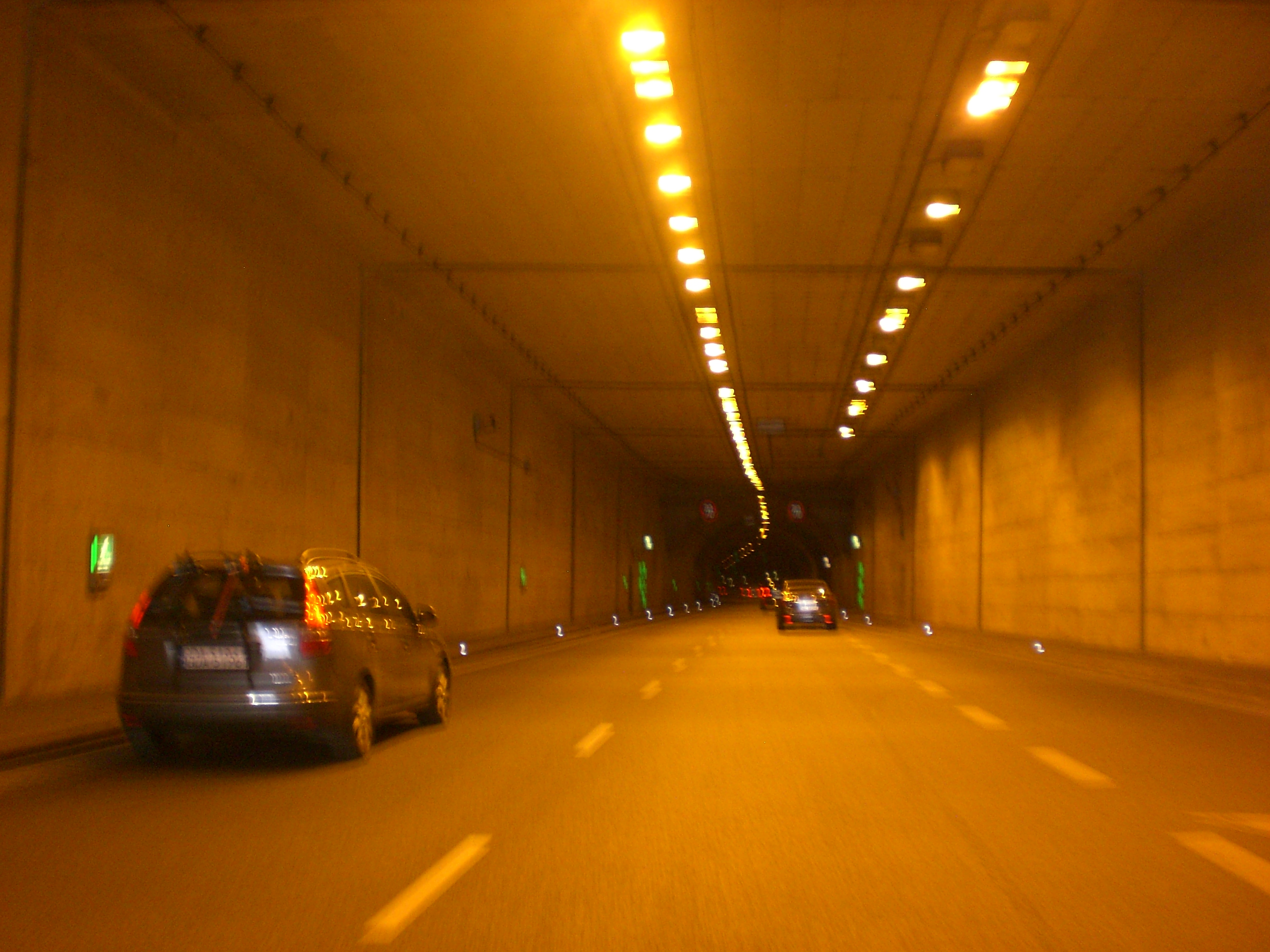
The interior of the tunnel, 2023
