= Betong Mongkhonrit Tunnel =

Coordinates: 5.769034°N 101.071575°E

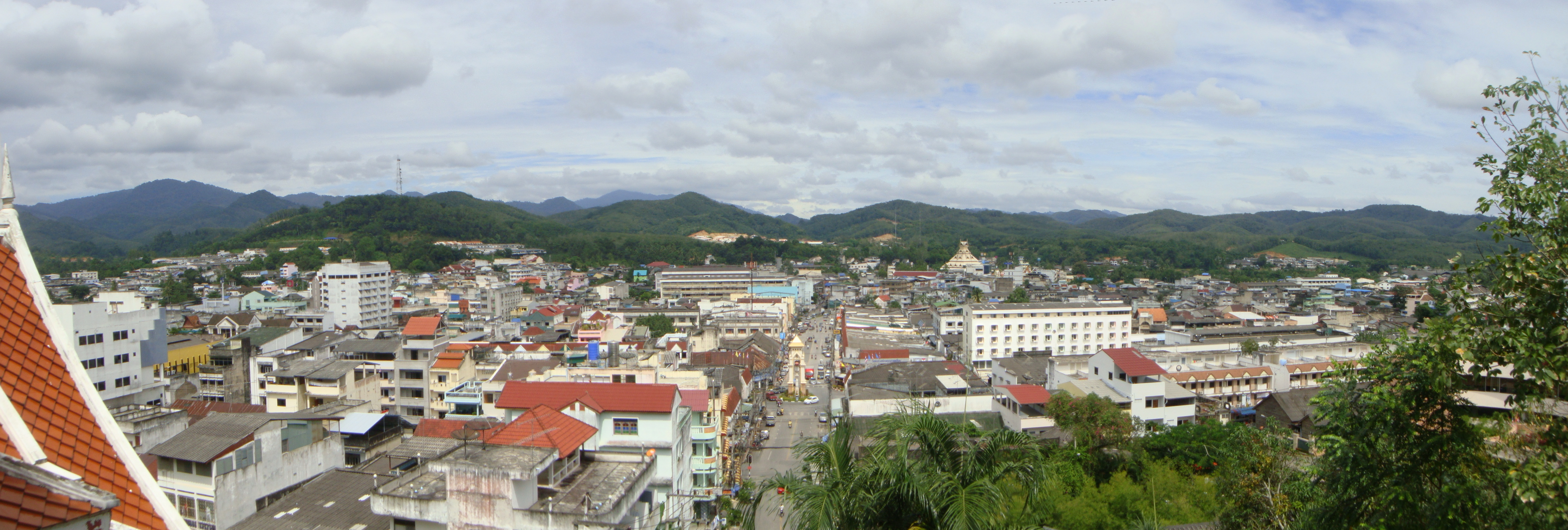
Panoramic view of Betong, Yala Province, Thailand, relevant to the Betong Mongkhonrit Tunnel

The Betong Mongkhonrit Tunnel (Thai: อุโมงค์เบตงมงคลฤทธิ์) is the first and largest road tunnel in Thailand. It is located in Betong, Yala Province, Thailand. It is a curved tunnel, 268 metres long, connecting the town centre with a newer part of the town to the South-East. The tunnel was opened on 1 January 2001.
