= Baguashan Tunnel (THSR) =

Railway tunnel in Taiwan

Baguashan Tunnel 八卦山隧道
- Interactive map of Baguashan Tunnel 八卦山隧道

Overview
- Line: THSR
- Location: Bagua Plateau（Changhua CountyChanghua、Fenyuan、Dacun、Yuanlin）
- Coordinates: 24°03′53.32″N 120°36′30.11″E
- Status: complete
- System: THSR
- Start: 石牌里, Changhua, Changhua County
- End: 東北里, Yuanlin, Changhua County

Operation
- Work began: Apr 9, 2001
- Constructed: 507 days
- Opened: Jan 5, 2007
- Owner: Taiwan High Speed Rail Corporation
- Operator: Taiwan High Speed Rail
- Traffic: High-speed rail

Technical
- Length: 7,357 metres (24,137 ft)
- Line length: 7,357 metres (24,137 ft)
- Track length: 7,357 metres (24,137 ft)
- No. of tracks: Double
- Track gauge: 1,435 mm (4 ft 8 1/2 in)
- Electrified: AC 25KV
- Operating speed: 315 kilometres per hour (196 mph)
- Max elevation: 200 metres (660 ft)
- Min elevation: 26 metres (85 ft)
- Tunnel clearance: 11.76 metres (38.6 ft)

Baguashan Tunnel (Chinese: 八卦山隧道) is a railway tunnel through Baguashan in Taiwan, located between Taichung HSR station and Changhua HSR station. With a route length of 7,357 meters, it is the longest tunnel on Taiwan High Speed Rail. Mileage of Baguashan Tunnel is TK173+021to TK180+378.

== History ==
- Apr 9, 2001 work begun.
- Aug 29, 2002 breakthrough.
- Jan 5, 2007 opened.
