= Lintgen =

Town in Luxembourg

Lintgen Lëntgen
- Commune
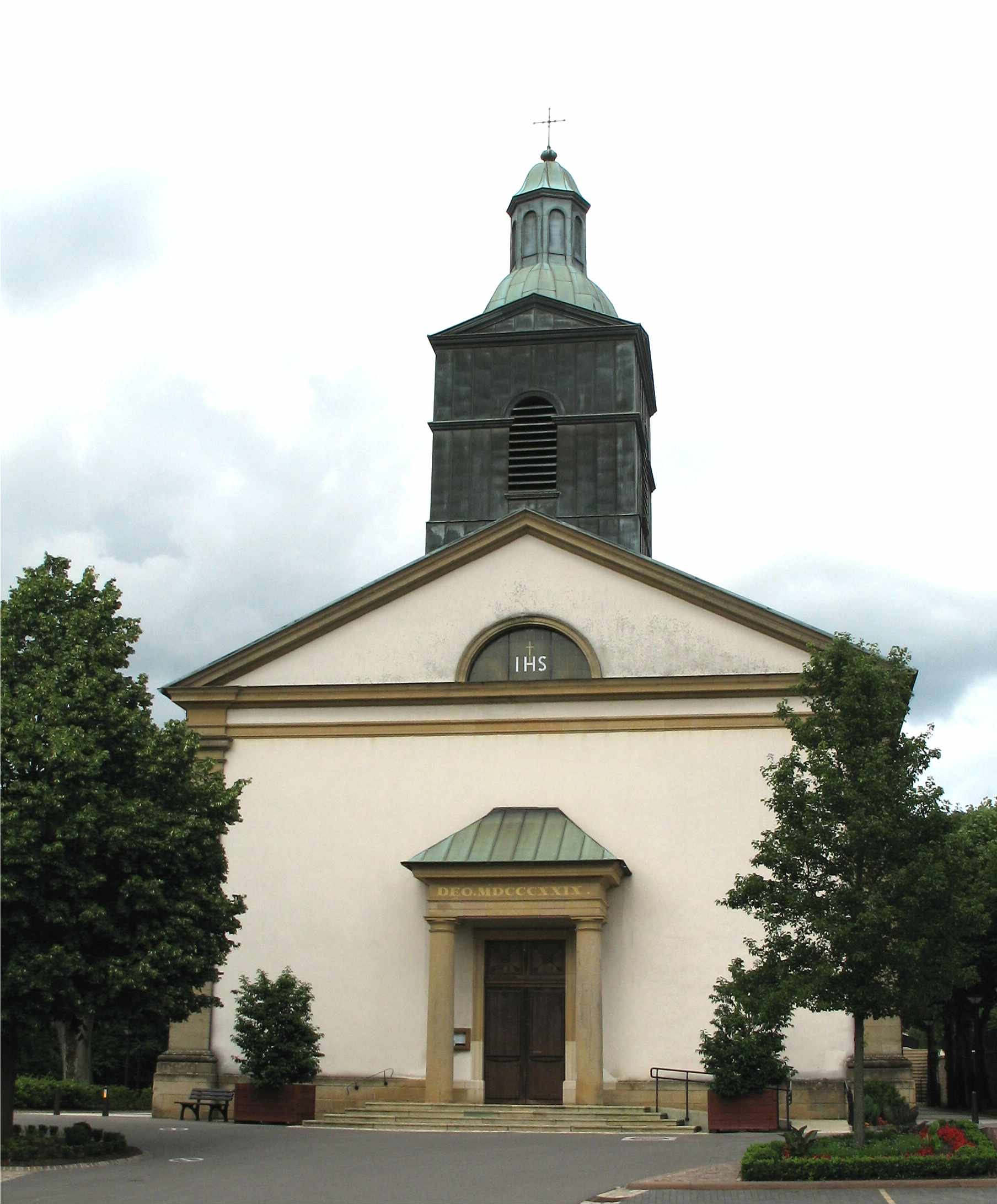
- The church

- Coat of arms

- Map of Luxembourg with Lintgen highlighted in orange, and the canton in dark red
- Coordinates: 49.7167°N 6.1333°E
- Country: Luxembourg
- Canton: Mersch

Government
  - Mayor: Louis Pinto

Area
  - Total: 15.25 km^{2} (5.89 sq mi)
  - Rank: 75th of 100
- Highest elevation: 414 m (1,358 ft)
  - Rank: 39th of 100
- Lowest elevation: 216 m (709 ft)
  - Rank: 33rd of 100

Population (2025)
  - Total: 3,483
  - Rank: 51st of 100
  - Density: 228.4/km^{2} (591.5/sq mi)
  - Rank: 37th of 100
- Time zone: UTC+1 (CET)
  - Summer (DST): UTC+2 (CEST)
- LAU 2: LU0000407
- Website: lintgen.lu

Lintgen (Luxembourgish: Lëntgen) is a town in central Luxembourg and the capital of the commune of the same name. Lintgen situated in the canton of Mersch and located on the river Alzette. The commune of Lintgen also includes the towns of Gosseldange and Prettingen.

== History ==
Lintgen is first formally mentioned in Franconian records in 896 CE. However, traces of settlement in the area predate this mention, and include prehistoric, Celtic, and Roman artifacts. The town was involved in the Battle of the Bulge during World War II.

== Culture ==
Lintgen is home to Maison L'Orgue, a restaurant and cultural center built in what was previously the only organ manufacturer in Luxembourg. The building was built in 1923 and opened as the Westenfelder organ workshop in 1924. It was granted historic landmark status in 2011, and restored and reopened as a restaurant in June of 2025.

The Open Air Field, an electronic music event featuring EDM and deep house, took place in Lintgen from 2007 to 2016. The event began under the name Feldparty, and received a new name and format as Open Air Field in 2014. The Open Air Field event included multiple DJs performing on two stages across two days. In 2017, the event was canceled due to a lack of government permitting.

Lintgen contains multiple hiking trails with varying difficulties to attract backpackers and outdoorsmen.
