= Nahqi Tunnel =

Road tunnel in Pakistan

Coordinates: 34.409370°N 71.341857°E

- Interactive map of Nahqi Tunnel

Overview
- Location: Halimzai tehsil of Mohmand District, Pakistan

Operation
- Work began: 2014
- Constructed: Frontier Works Organization (FWO)
- Opened: 27 September 2017

Technical
- Design engineer: NESPAK
- Length: 754 m (2,474 ft)
- Width: 8.1 m (27 ft)

The Nahqi Tunnel is a two-lane, bi-directional road tunnel with a D-shaped cross-section located in Mohmand District, Pakistan. It was constructed by the Frontier Works Organisation (FWO) and opened by Chief of Army Staff (COAS) Qamar Javed Bajwa. The tunnel is 751 meters long and cost Rs. 2.4 billion ($23 million) to build.

This tunnel is part of a larger project that includes an expressway between Ghallanai, the headquarters of Mohmand District, and Nahakki Yusaf Khel in the first phase of the project. The expressway is expected to reduce travel time between Peshawar, Mohmand District, and Bajaur.
