= Maliguda Tunnel =

Coordinates: 18.948373°N 82.646585°E

- Interactive map of Maliguda Tunnel

Overview
- Line: Kothavalasa–Kirandul line
- Location: Odisha
- Status: Active
- Start: Jeypore
- End: Koraput

Operation
- Opened: 1968
- Owner: Indian Railways
- Operator: Indian Railways
- Traffic: Train

Technical
- Line length: 4.42 km (2.75 mi)
- No. of tracks: single track
- Track gauge: 1,676 mm (5 ft 6 in) (Broad gauge)

The Maliguda Tunnel of Odisha is the 4th Biggest broad-gauge railway tunnel in India after "Banihal – Quazigund Tunnel" which is in the state of Jammu & Kashmir. The tunnel is 13 km east of Jeypore, India, 27 km from Koraput. The tunnel on which the entire route of 430 km was built by Japan Engineers in between (1961–68) with Japanese collaboration for the supply of Iron Ore from Kirandul to Vizag Port via- Dantewara, Jagdalpur, Jeypore, Koraput, Padua, Araku, Kottavalasa.

== History ==
The Maliguda Tunnel in Koraput district, Odisha, is part of the 450 km Kirandul–Kothavalasa railway line. The line was opened in 1966–67 under the South Eastern Railway. It was constructed between 1960 and 1968 by Japan Engineers with Japanese financial aid. Its primary purpose was to transport iron ore from the Bailadila mines to Visakhapatnam Port for export to Japan. The challenging terrain of the Eastern Ghats made the construction of tunnels and viaducts particularly difficult and resulted in heavy loss of life.

== Structure and Usage ==
The Maliguda Tunnel is a broad-gauge railway tunnel, approximately 4.42 km long. It is considered one of India's longest broad-gauge railway tunnels. The tunnel is part of the Kirandul-Kottavalasa railway line, which traverses the Eastern Ghats. It is situated 13 km east of Jeypore and 27 km from Koraput. The construction of the railway line in this region involved challenging topography and geological conditions. The alignment has steep gradients and curves with sharp radius up to 5 degrees. The surrounding area is characterized by dense forests, hills, and waterfalls, including one that flows under the tunnel itself. The Maliguda Tunnel Bridge is one of the point of interest for visitors in Odisha.
