= Changbin, Taitung =

Rural township in Taitung County, Taiwan

Coordinates: 23°19′N 121°27′E

Changbin Township 長濱鄉 Nagahama
- Rural township
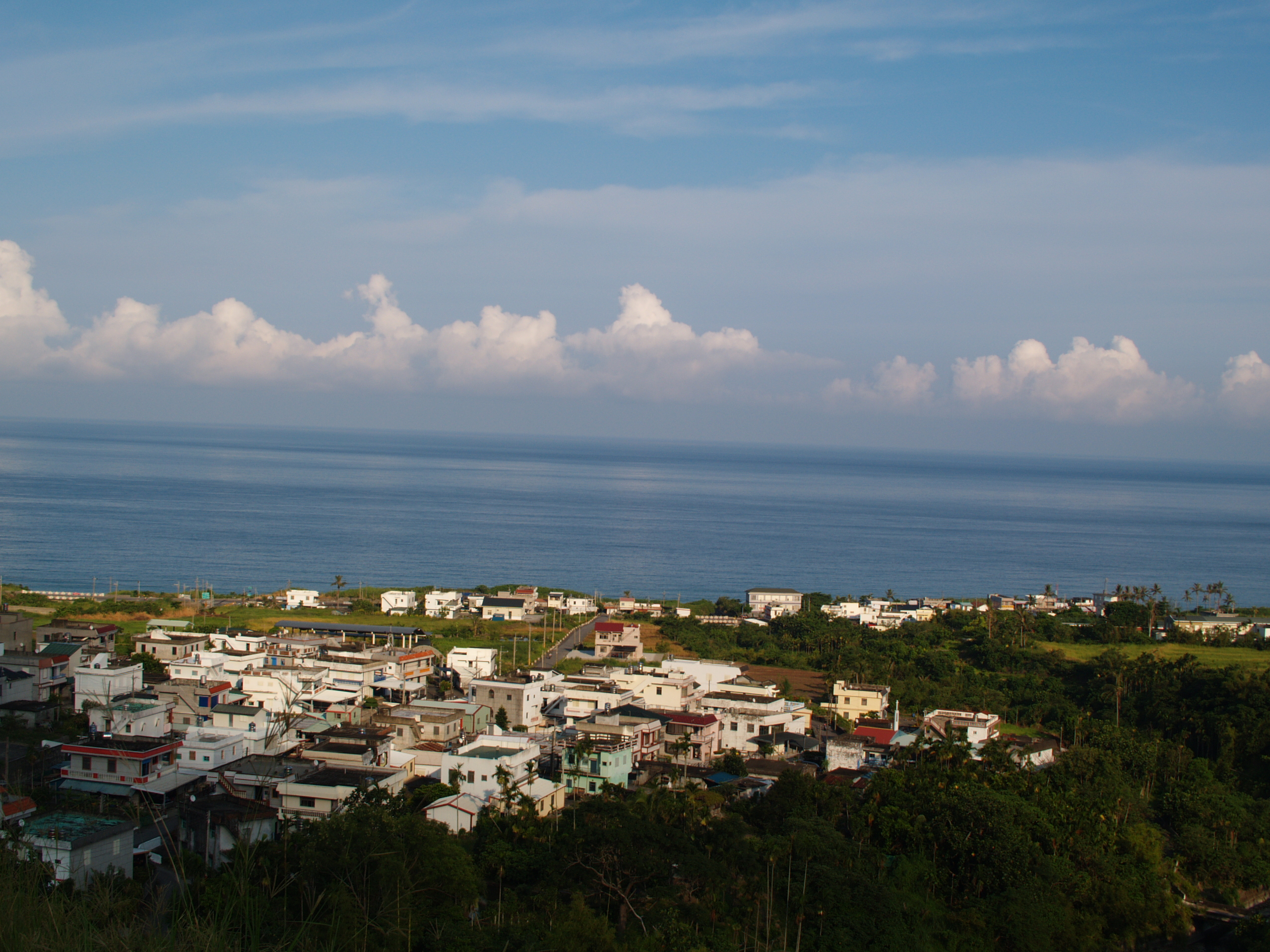
- Ningpu Village, with the Pacific Ocean in the background

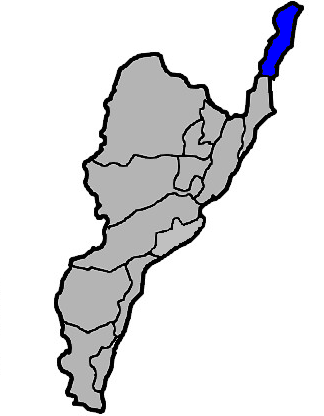
- Changbin Township in Taitung County
- Location: Taitung County, Taiwan

Area
  - Total: 155 km^{2} (60 sq mi)

Population (February 2023)
  - Total: 6,722
  - Density: 43.4/km^{2} (112/sq mi)
- Website: www.changbin.gov.tw (in Chinese)

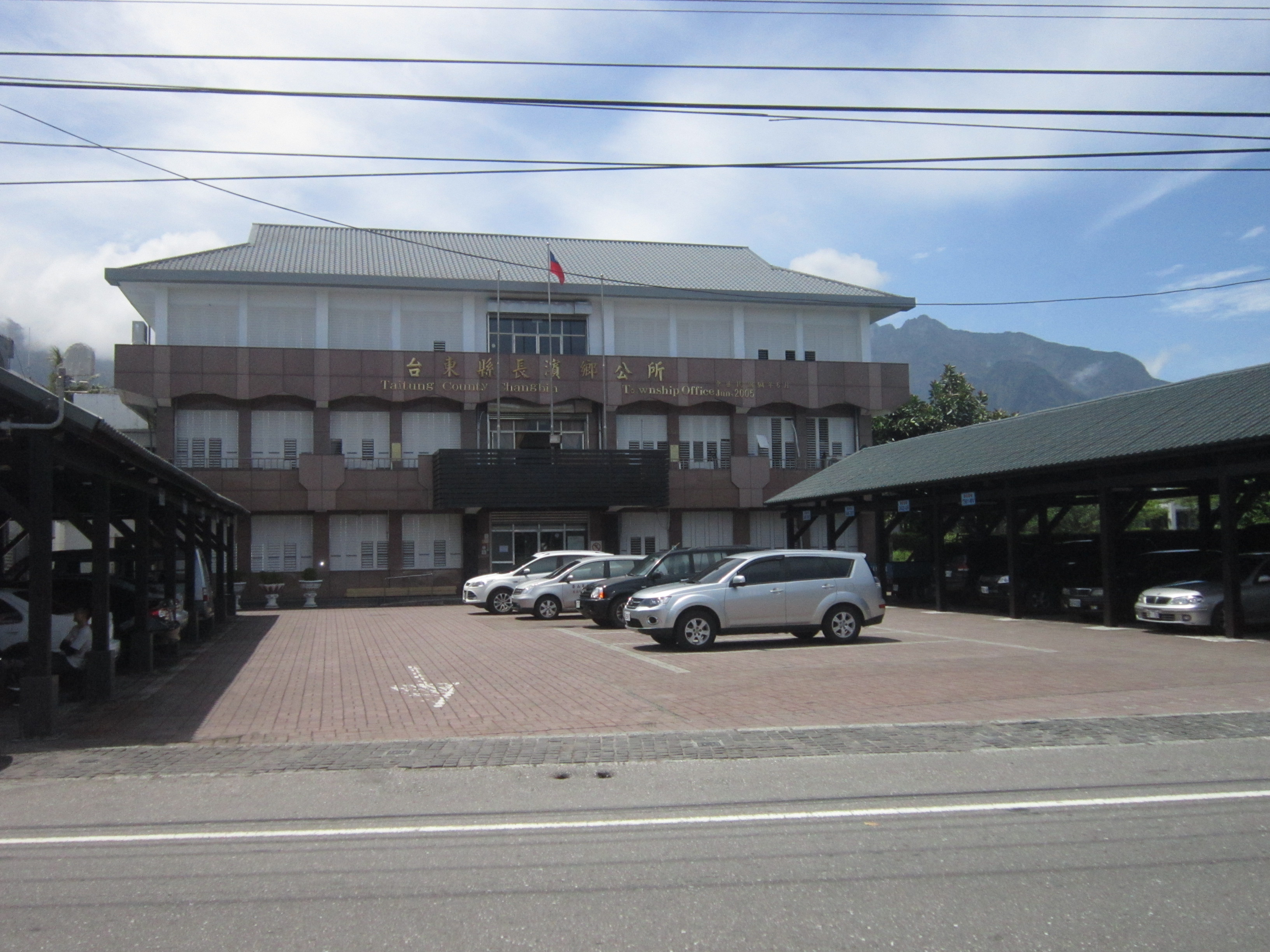
Changbin Township Office

Changbin Township (Chinese: 長濱鄉; pinyin: Chángbīn Xiāng; Pe̍h-ōe-jī: Tiông-pin-hiong) is a rural township in Taitung County, Taiwan. It is the northernmost township in Taitung County. The population of the township consists mainly of the Amis people with a Kavalan minority.

== Geography ==
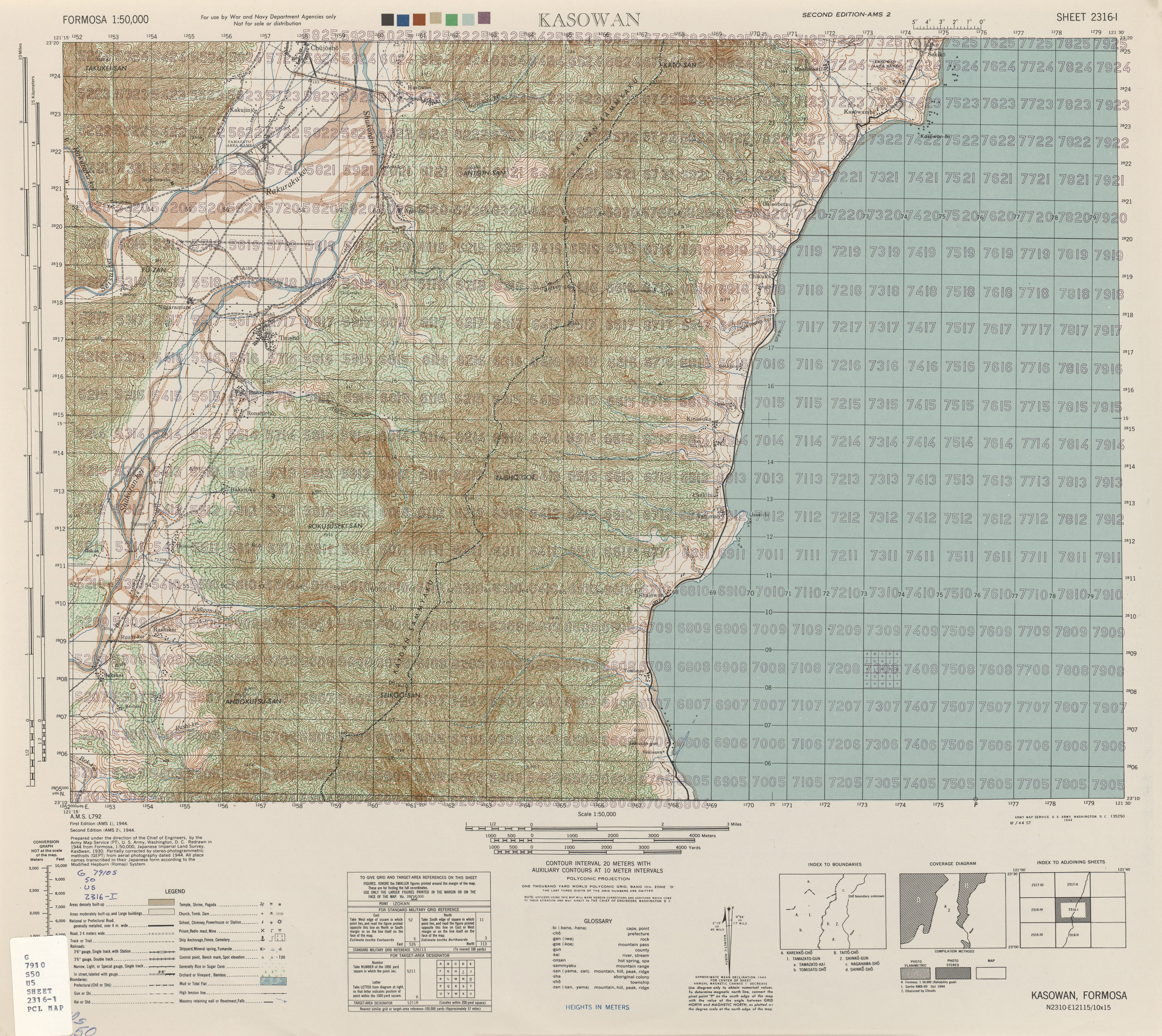
Map of the region including the Changbin area (1944)

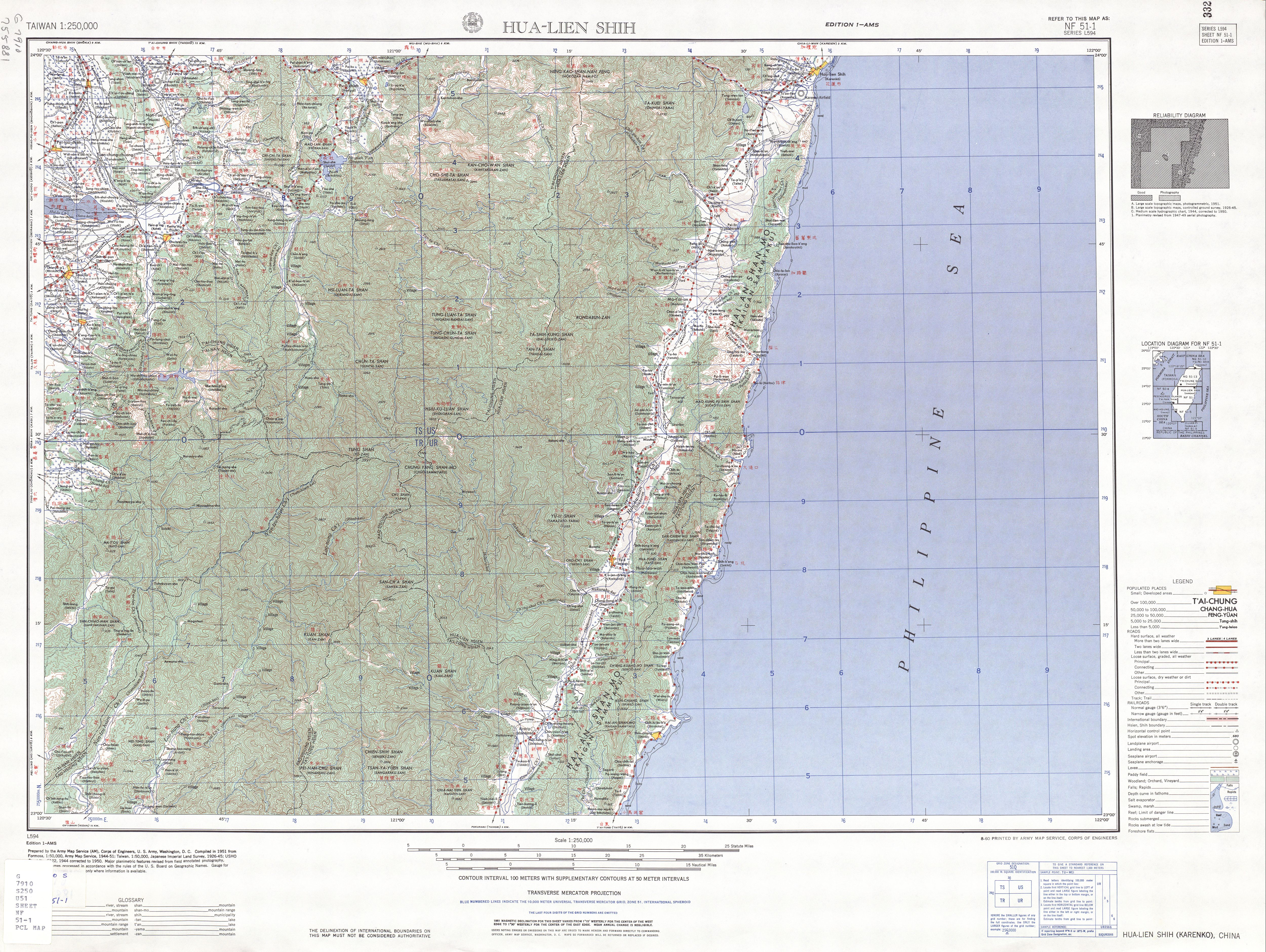
Map of the region including the Changbin area (1951)

- Area: 155.19 km^{2}
- Population: 6,722 people (February 2023)

== Administrative divisions ==
The township comprises six villages: Changbin, Ningpu, Sanjian/Sanchien, Zhangyuan/Changyuan, Zhongyong/Chungyung and Zhuhu/Chuhu.

== Tourist attractions ==
- Baxian Caves
- Chilin Ruins
- Chungyung Ruins

== Transportation ==
- Changbin Port
- Wushibi Port
