= Hai'an Range =

Mountain range in Taiwan

Coordinates: 23.3°N 121.4°E

- Coastal Mountain Range
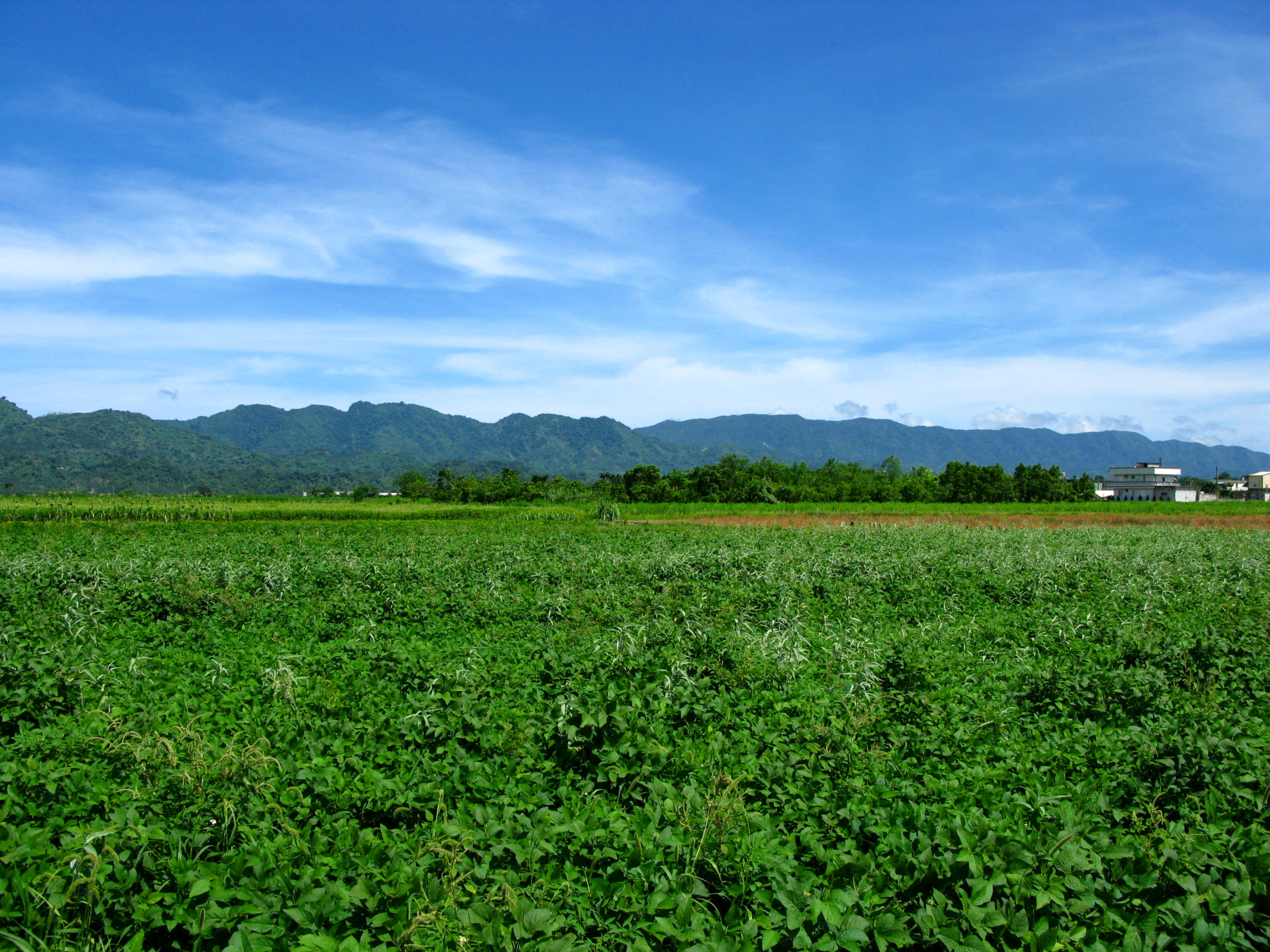

Naming
- Native name: 海岸山脈 (Chinese)

Geography
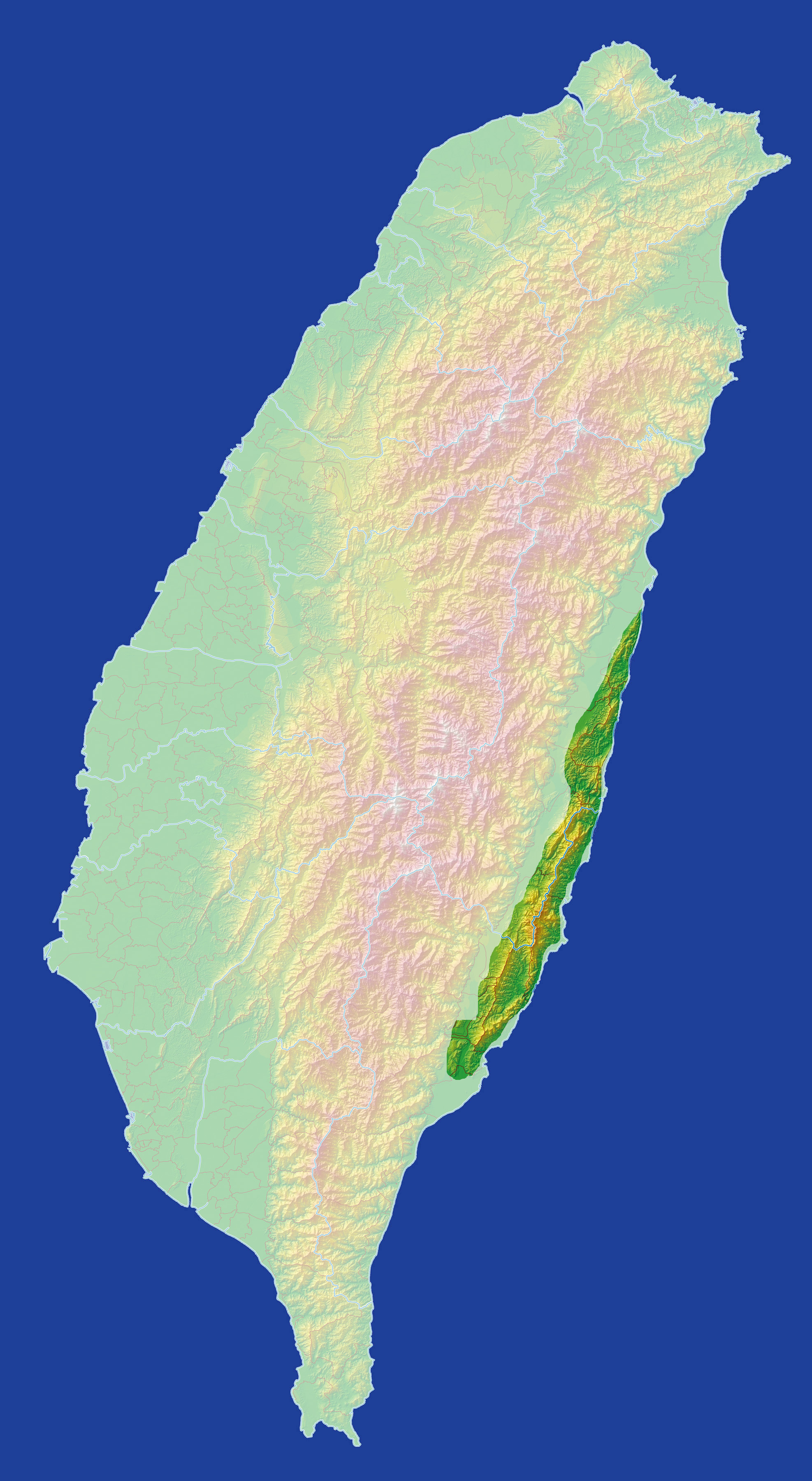
- Location: Taiwan

Geology
- Mountain type: Mountain range

The Coastal Mountain Range, also known as the Hai'an Range (Chinese: 海岸山脈; pinyin: Hǎi'àn Shānmài), is a mountain range situated on the eastern coast of the island of Taiwan, and spans the border between Hualien and Taitung Counties. The Coastal Mountain Range is the northern portion of the Luzon Arc but do not present current volcanic activity. Its geology is mainly composed of a Miocene volcanic basement covered by a thick (ca.4-6km) sedimentary pile of deep to shallow marine clastic deposits, mostly derived from the adjacent Central Range mountains to the west.

The Huadong Valley, the result of the collision of two tectonic plates, is at the west end of the range, and the tallest peak of the range is Xingangshan (新港山), which stands 1,682 m (5,518 ft) tall. Currently, those peaks are still rising with an annual speed of 3 mm. The Hai'an Range is also converging with Central Mountain Range with an average speed of 2.3 cm per year.

There are several small basins located around the range, the largest of which is Taiyuan Basin.

== Gallery ==
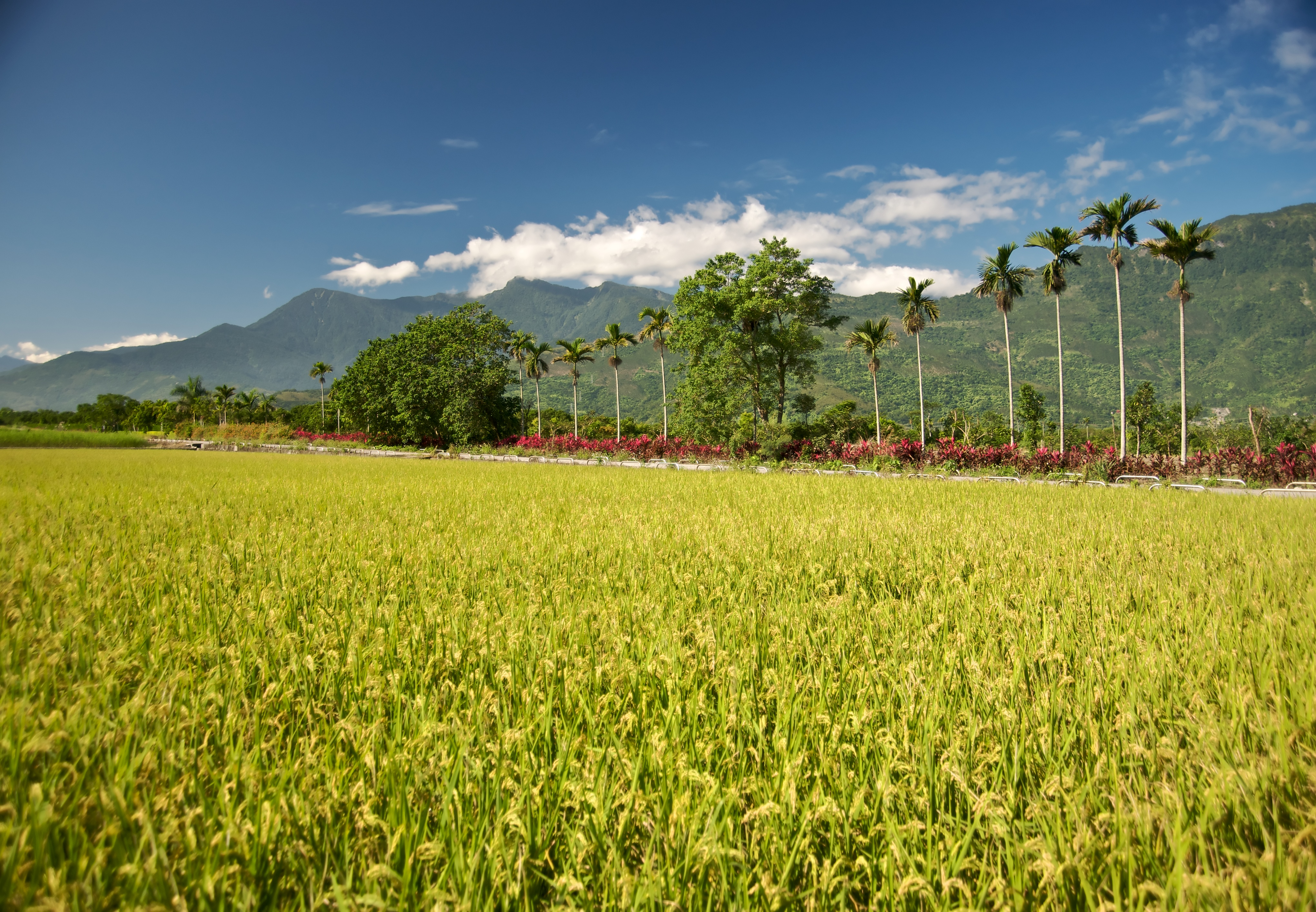

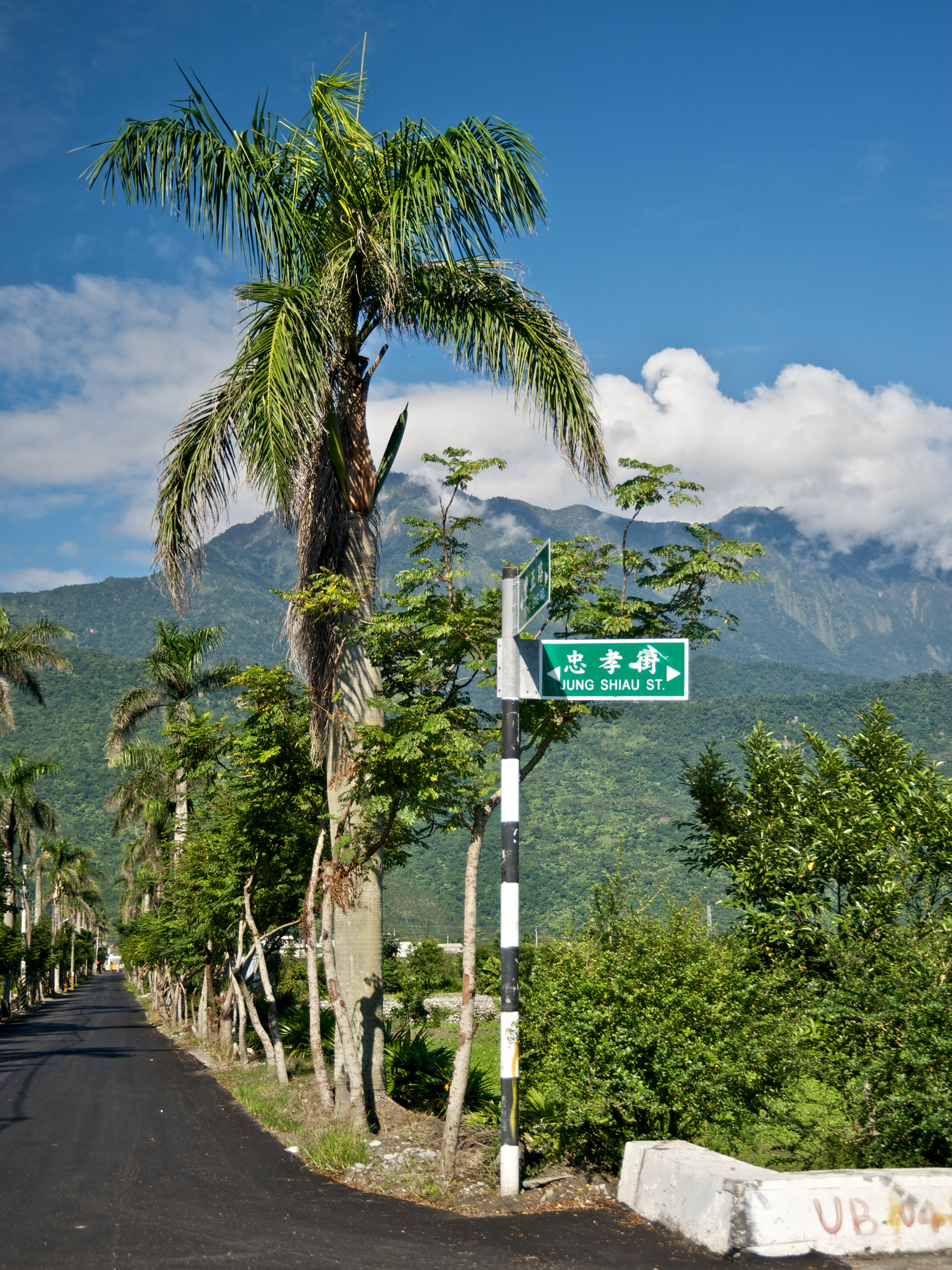

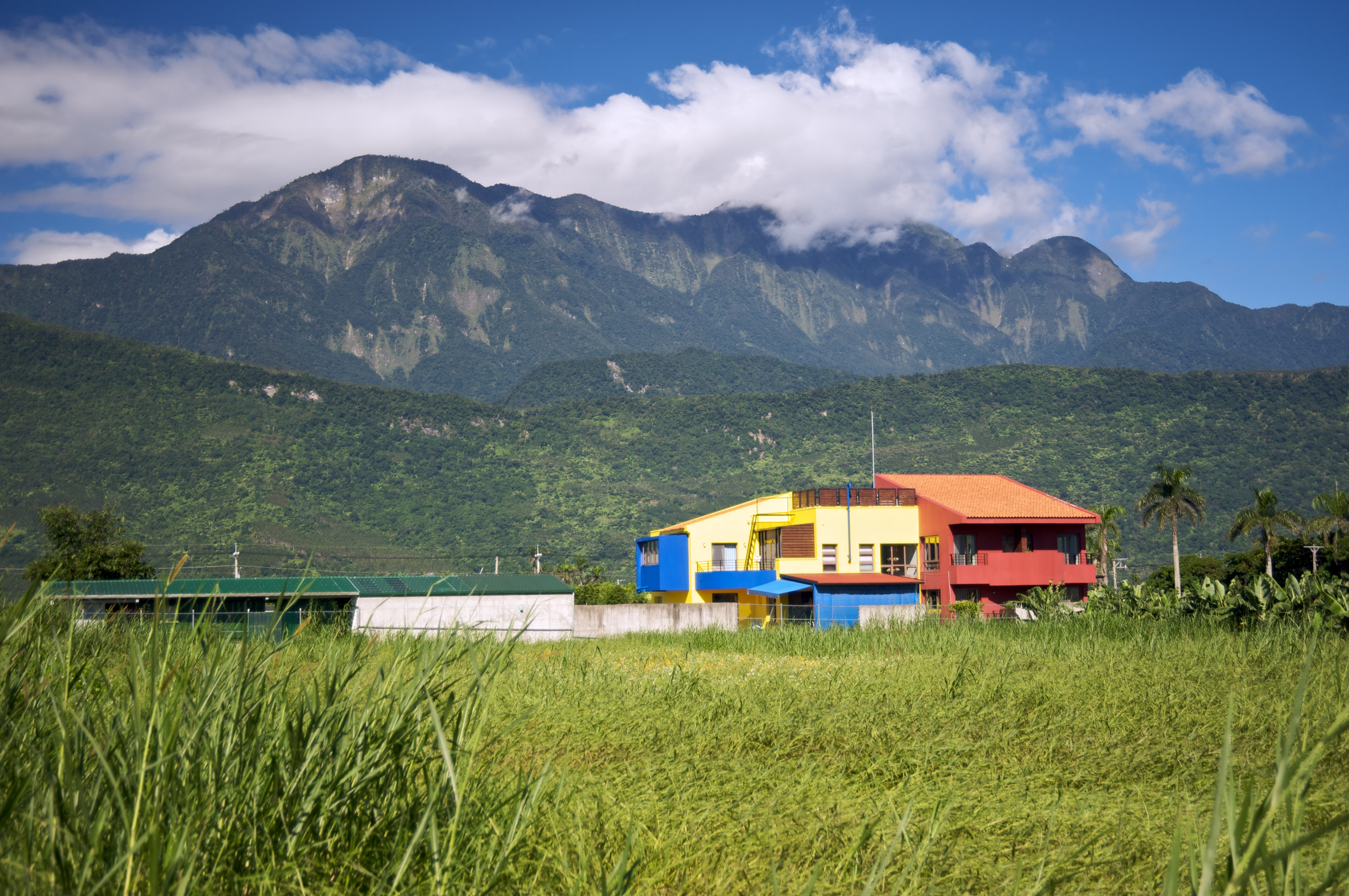

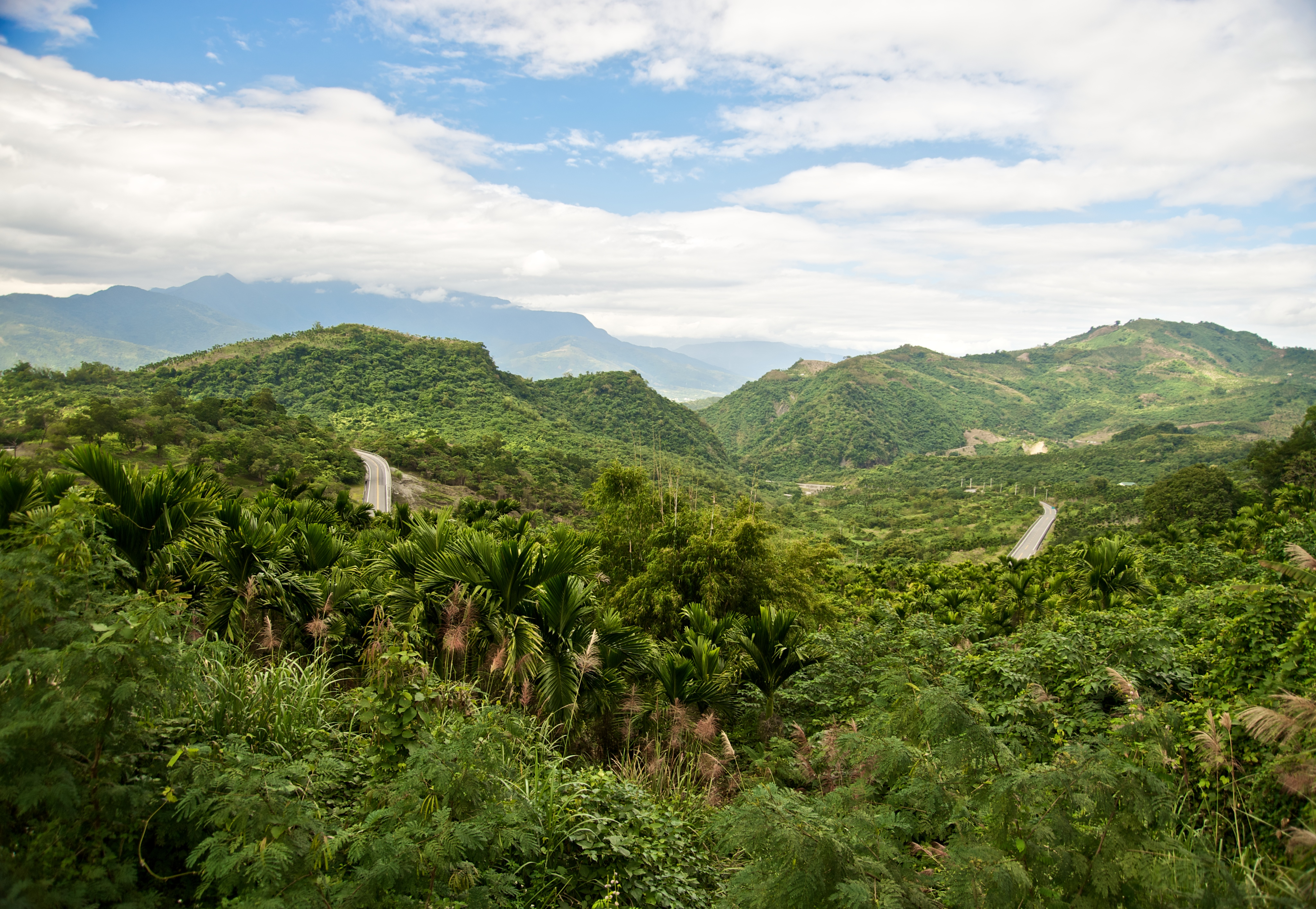

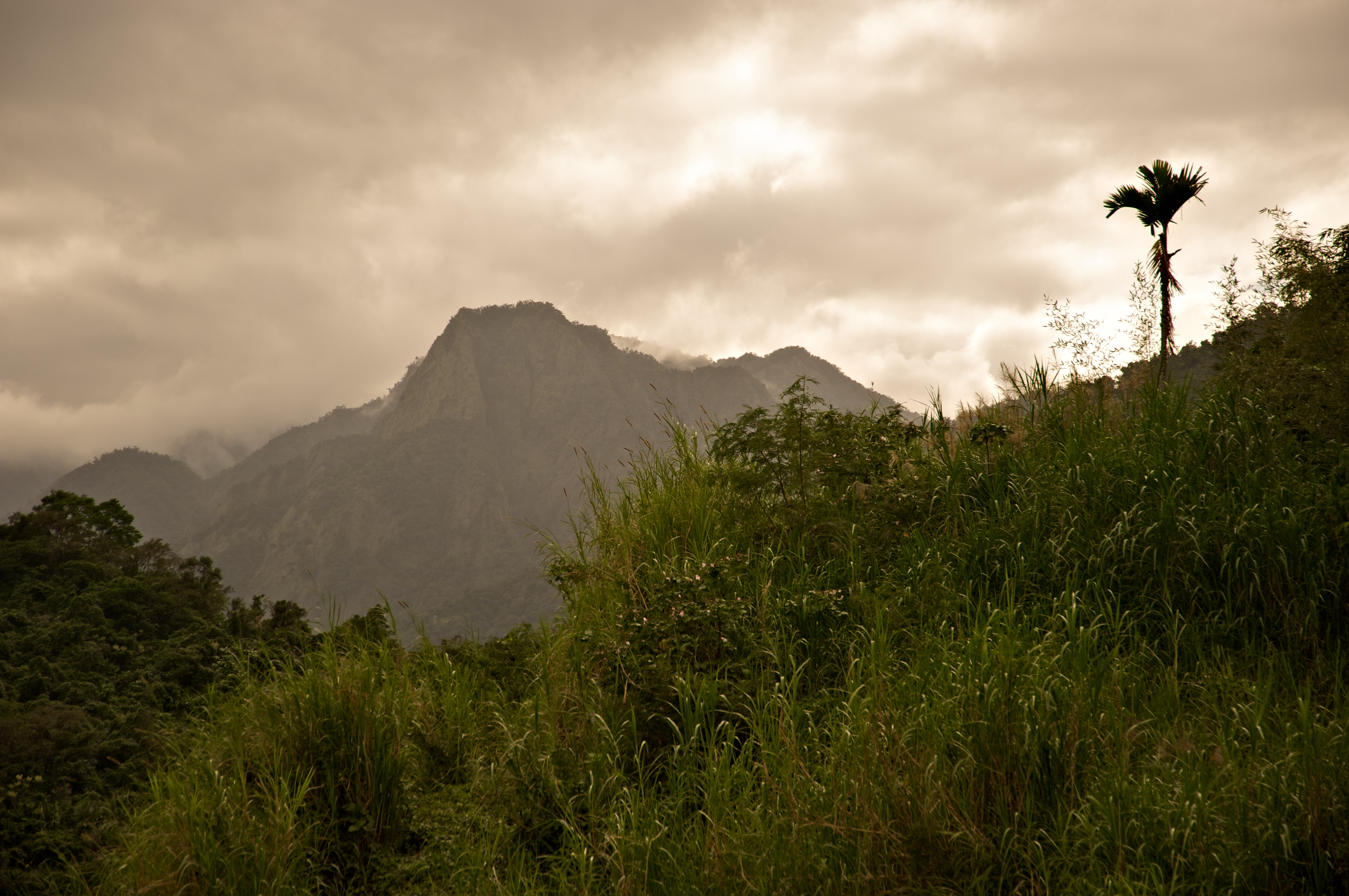

== See also ==
- Hualien
- Taitung
- Convergent boundary
