= Port Island (Gdańsk) =

Island in Poland

Native name: Wyspa Portowa
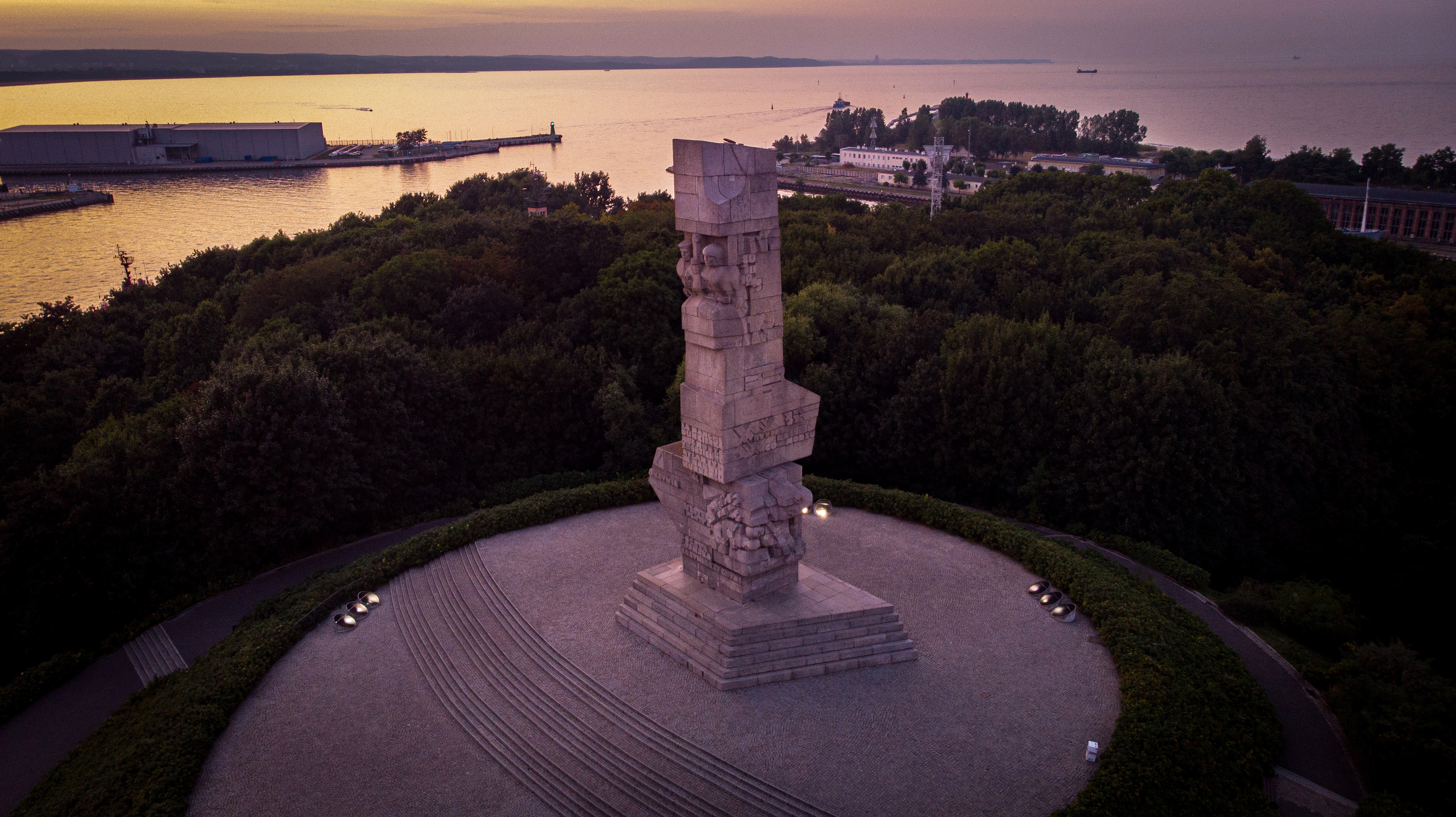
- Westerplatte Monument in memory of the Polish defenders

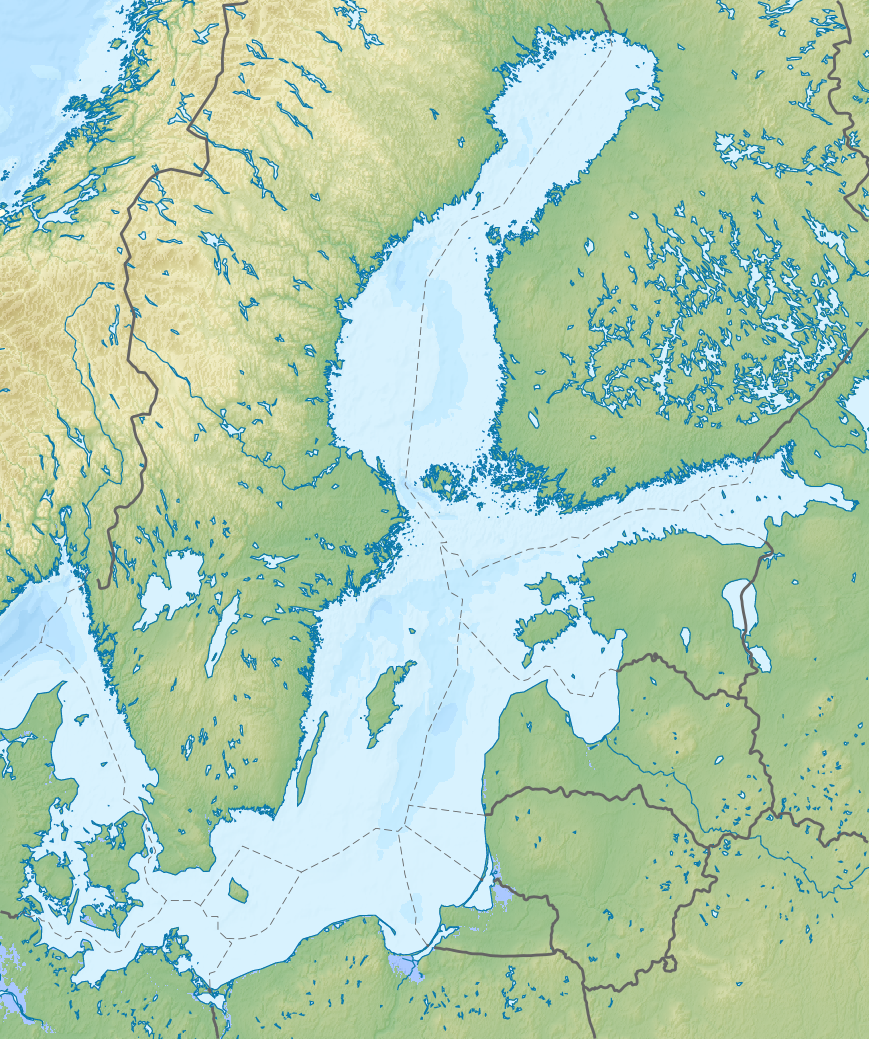
- Location within Poland Location within Baltic Sea

Geography
- Location: Baltic Sea
- Coordinates: 54°22′52″N 18°43′23″E
- Area: 262 km^{2} (101 sq mi)

Administration
- Poland
- Voivodeship: Pomeranian Voivodeship
- City: Gdańsk
- Districts: Krakowiec-Górki Zachodnie, Przeróbka, Stogi

Demographics
- Population: 15317 (2021)
- Ethnic groups: Poles

Additional information
- Time zone: CET (UTC+1)
  - Summer (DST): CEST (UTC+2)

Port Island (Polish: Wyspa Portowa, German: Die Nehrung) is an island located between Gdańsk Bay, Śmiała Wisła and Leniwka in northern Poland within the city limits of Gdańsk.

== Administration ==
The island is divided into 3 administrative quarters:

- Stogi, population 9,832, area 10.9 km^{2}, density 901
- Przeróbka, population 3,750, area 6.9 km^{2}, density 545
- Krakowiec-Górki Zachodnie, population 1,735, area 8.3 km^{2}, density 208

Total: population 15,317, area 26,2 km^{2} (2021)

== Industry ==
Industrial facilities of national importance are located on the island, incl. the Gdańsk refinery and Port Północny (Northern Port) with the Deepwater Container Terminal Gdańsk (part of the Port of Gdańsk).

== Sightseeing ==
- Wisłoujście Fortress, historic fortress dating back to the 15th century, that used to guard the mouth of the Port of Gdańsk, listed as a Historic Monument of Poland.
- Westerplatte, the place of the Battle of Westerplatte, the first battle of the German invasion of Poland and World War II, now a memorial and museum complex, listed as a Historic Monument of Poland.

== See also ==
- List of islands of Poland
