= Przeróbka =

- District (dzielnica)
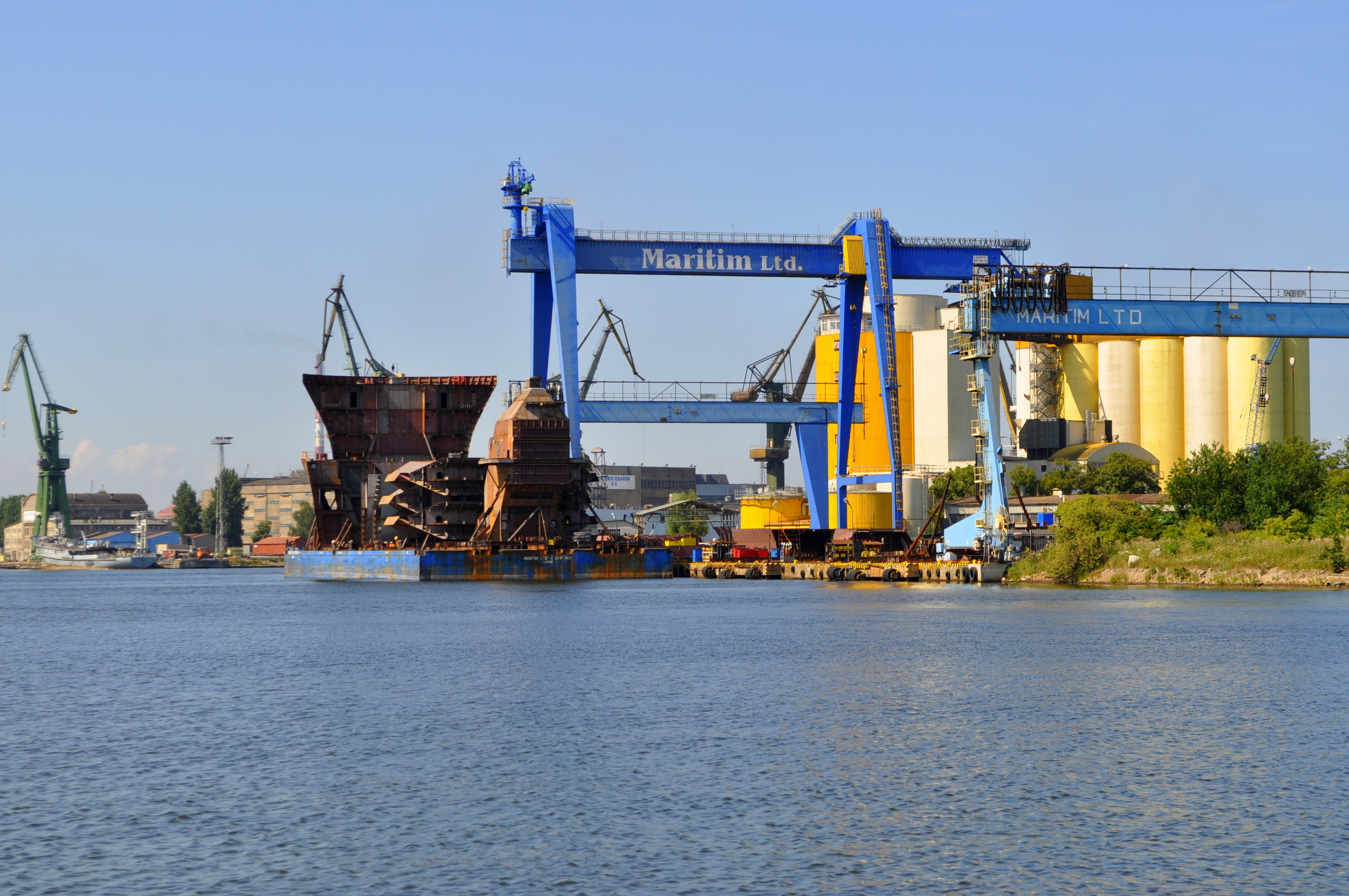
- Maritim shipyard and the factory of Malteurop

- Location of Przeróbka within Gdańsk
- Coordinates: 54°22′57″N 18°40′27″E
- Country: Poland
- Voivodeship: Pomeranian
- County/City: Gdańsk

Area
  - Total: 7.098 km^{2} (2.741 sq mi)

Population (2011)
  - Total: 4,816
  - Density: 678.5/km^{2} (1,757/sq mi)
- Time zone: UTC+1 (CET)
  - Summer (DST): UTC+2 (CEST)
- Area code: +48 58

Przeróbka (German: Troyl) is one of the administrative districts (dzielnica administracyjna) of the city of Gdańsk, Poland. It is notable for its significant industrial areas and containing the historically important Westerplatte peninsula.

== Location ==
Przeróbka is bounded by the Gdańsk Bay to the north, the Martwa Wisła to the south, and the Kashubian Canal to the west. Administratively, it borders Stogi to the east, Rudniki and Śródmieście to the south, and Młyniska, Letnica, and Nowy Port to the west. It consists of the quarters (osiedla) of Przeróbka, Sączki, Westerplatte, and Wisłoujście.

== History ==
The first written mention of Wisłoujście Fortress occurred in 1379, describing a small wooden construction. It was destroyed by a storm in 1456, but its crucial role led to it being expanded after the storm with a new round tower in 1482. The fort then grew rapidly in the 16th century, undergoing further modernizations well into the early 20th century before being abandoned and neglected. It was restored extensively in the early 21st century, and is today open to tourists.

The area of Westerplatte was first a small collection of islands, becoming one singular island in the 18th century. Its military importance grew, and it was linked to land in 1840, after a flood created the Śmiała Wisła, redirecting significant amounts of water.

The district's current name was first noted in 1757, and was also known as Przerabka. Its name comes from the term przerobić, meaning to redo or to forge, in this sense referring to the various processes Polish wheat would go through in the area before arriving in Gdańsk's markets. It grew as an industrial area in the 19th century, with many forms of industry, primarily focused on railways and shipbuilding. A sewage treatment plant was also present in Sączki, then known as Rieselfeld.

In 1907, Przeróbka, known in German as Troyl, became part of the city of Danzig proper. Industrial growth continued in the area, although its resident count remained rather low, having around 400 inhabitants as of 1907. In 1921, Westerplatte became one of the few parts of the new Free City of Danzig owned by Poland, becoming known as a Military Transit Depot (Wojskowa Składnica Tranzytowa). At 4:48 a.m. on 1 September 1939, the SMS Schleswig-Holstein fired some of the first shots of World War II at Westerplatte, beginning a lengthy battle over the militarized peninsula.

After the new Polish administration took over the area following World War II, the name of Troyl was initially translated as Trojan and then Zawiśle, but in 1948, it officially became Przeróbka. Industrial growth resumed following the war. In 2010, Przeróbka and the surrounding areas were formally separated from the nearby district of Stogi.

== Gallery ==
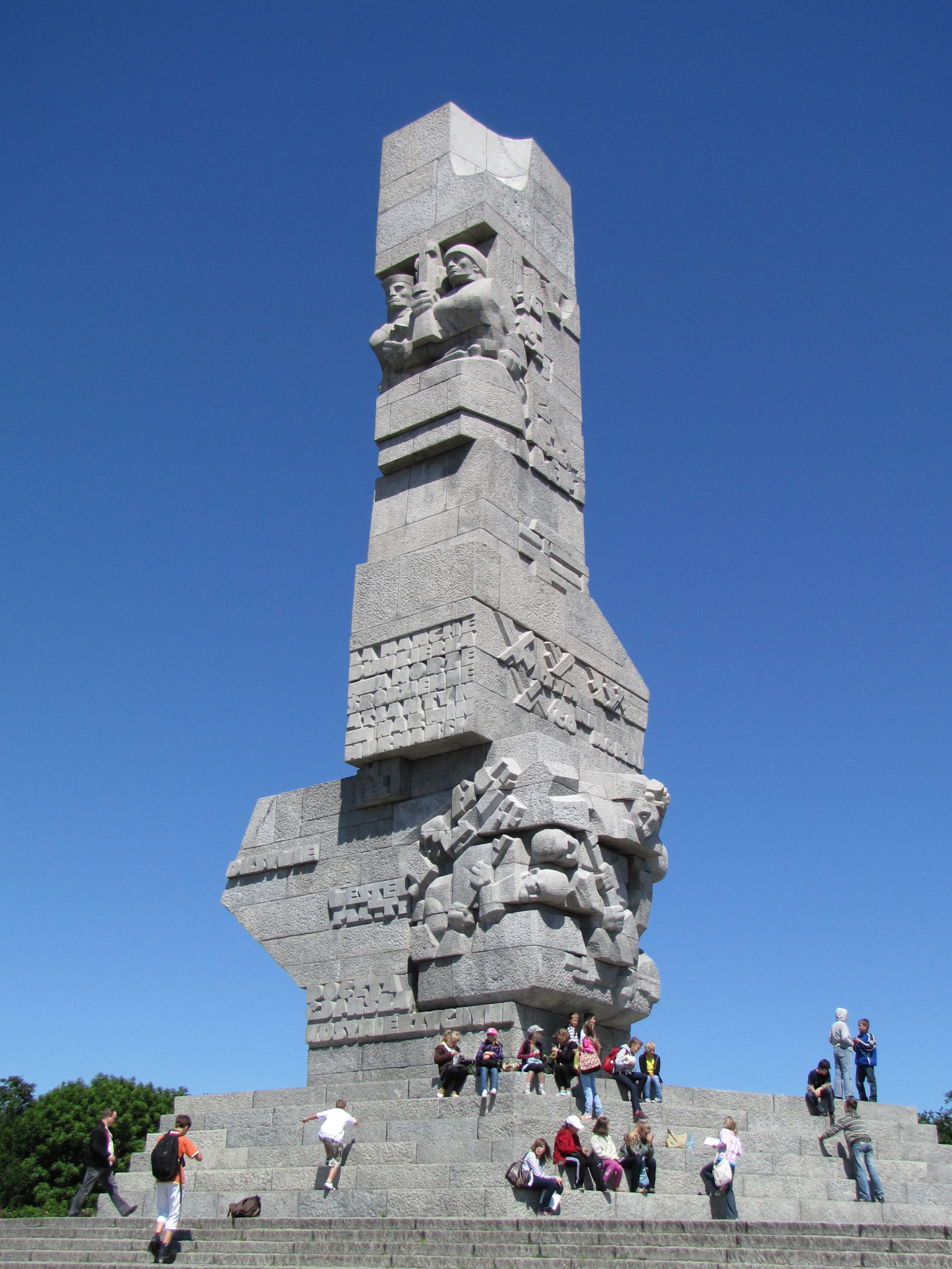
The Westerplatte Monument

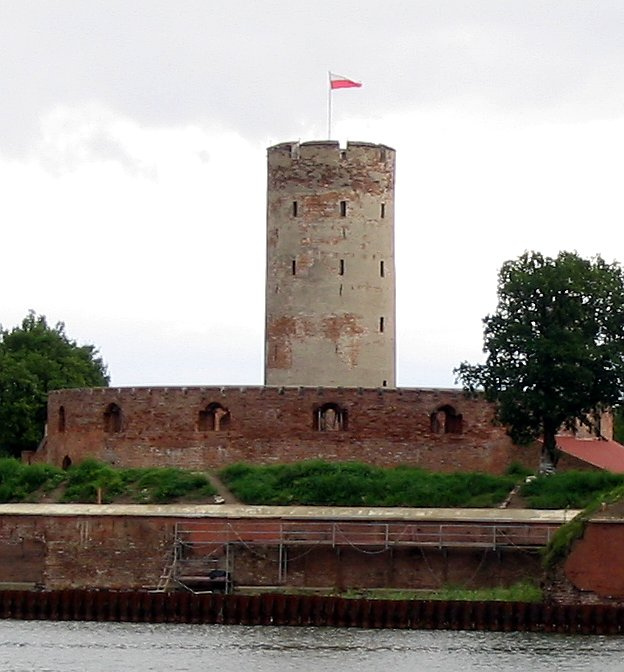
Wisłoujście Fortress

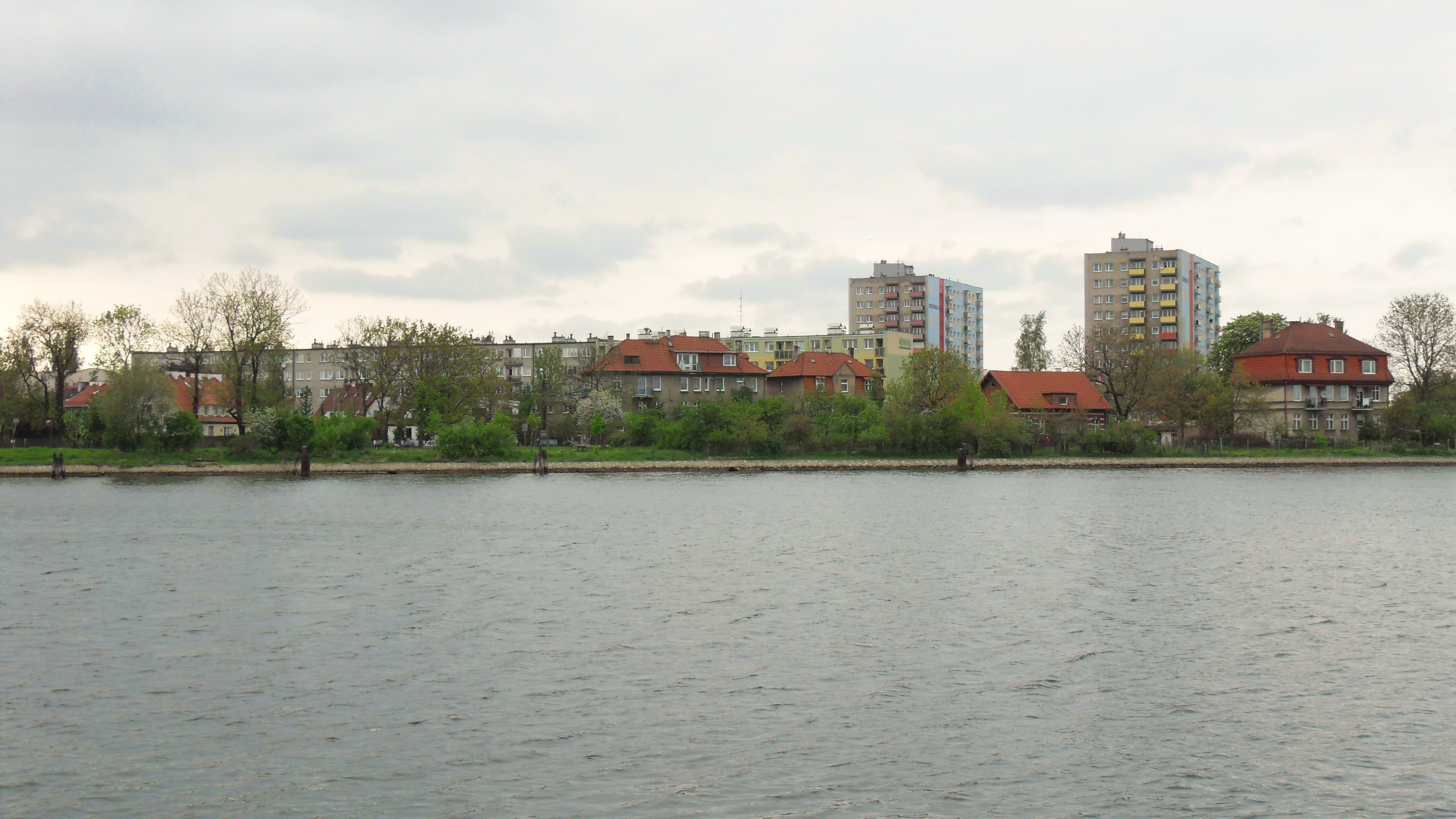
The Dead Vistula
