= Krakowiec-Górki Zachodnie =

District in the city of Gdańsk, Poland

- District (dzielnica)
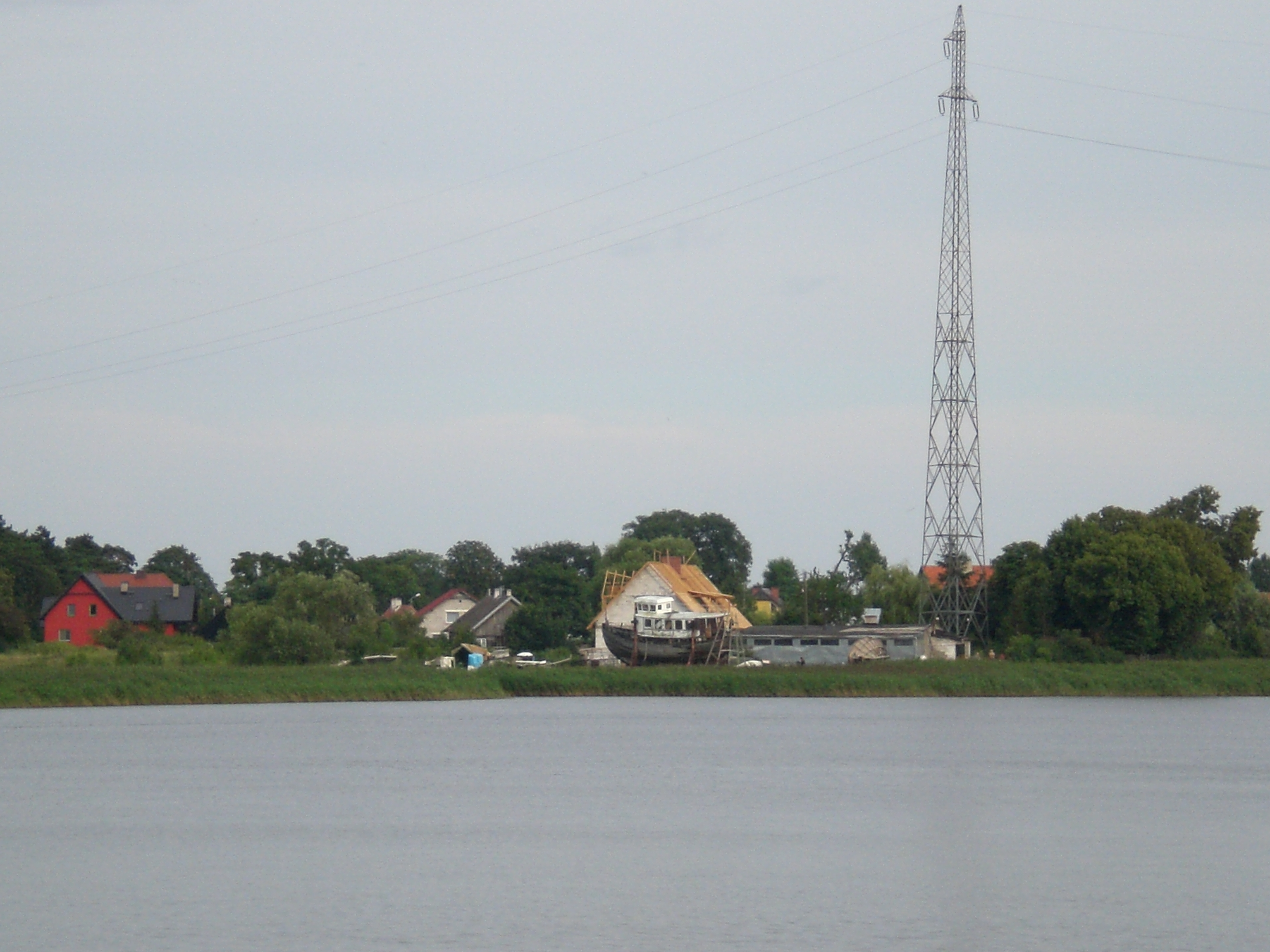
- Górki Zachodnie

- Location of Krakowiec-Górki Zachodnie within Gdańsk
- Coordinates: 54°21′44″N 18°45′11″E
- Country: Poland
- Voivodeship: (Pomeranian Voivodeship) Pomeranian
- County/City: Gdańsk

Area
  - Total: 8.38 km^{2} (3.24 sq mi)

Population (2011)
  - Total: 1,994
  - Density: 238/km^{2} (616/sq mi)
- Time zone: UTC+1 (CET)
  - Summer (DST): UTC+2 (CEST)
- Area code: +48 58

Krakowiec-Górki Zachodnie (Kashubian: Krakówc ë Zôpadné Górczi) is one of the administrative districts (dzielnica administracyjna) of the city of Gdańsk. It is located on Port Island.

== Location ==
Krakowiec-Górki Zachodnie is bounded by the Bay of Gdańsk to the north, the Śmiała Wisła to the east, and the Martwa Wisła to the south. Administratively, it borders Wyspa Sobieszewska to the east, Rudniki to the south, and Stogi to the west. it consists of the quarters (osiedla) of Krakowiec, Las Miejski, and Górki Zachodnie.

== History ==
=== Krakowiec ===
Krakowiec, for most of its history, was an agricultural village, known as Krakau in German and first appearing in the written record in 1424. It was located on an island on the Vistula River, but in the mid-17th century, the island started disappearing beneath the river's waters, so the village was moved onto the nearby spit. It remained a small settlement. As of 1819, it had 242 inhabitants, a forge, and three inns.

In 1840, the spit that Krakau was located on became an island after flooding created the Śmiała Wisła. Krakau became part of the city of Danzig in 1914, being taken by the Red Army after the 1945 siege on 3 April. Although Krakau is the German name for the city of Kraków, the new Polish authorities in the area decided not to name it after the already-extant city, instead naming it Krakowiec, which had been historically used for Krakau (the district), though not as often as Kraków.

=== Górki Zachodnie ===
Górki Zachodnie used to be part of a singular settlement, known as Górki or Nowy Prom (Newefehre in German). Similarly to Krakowiec, it was small and agricultural. As of 1819, it had 163 inhabitants and 2 inns. In 1840, aforementioned flooding created the Śmiała Wisła, which cut right through the village, dividing it into Górki Zachodnie, which contained most of the old village and was known in German as Westlich-Neufähr, and the smaller Górki Wschodnie, known in German as Östlich-Neufähr.

Light industry slowly developed in the town, which, in 1914, became part of the city of Danzig alongside Krakau. It was taken on 6 April 1945 by Soviet forces, 3 days after Krakau was. The new government has since significantly invested in the development of the fishing industry in the town; this has resulted in Górki Zachodnie today hosting one of Gdańsk's largest marinas, as well as the National Centre for Sailing of the Academy of Physical Education and Sport (Polish: Narodowe Centrum Żeglarstwa Akademii Wychowania Fizycznego i Sportu), opened in 2006.

== Gallery ==
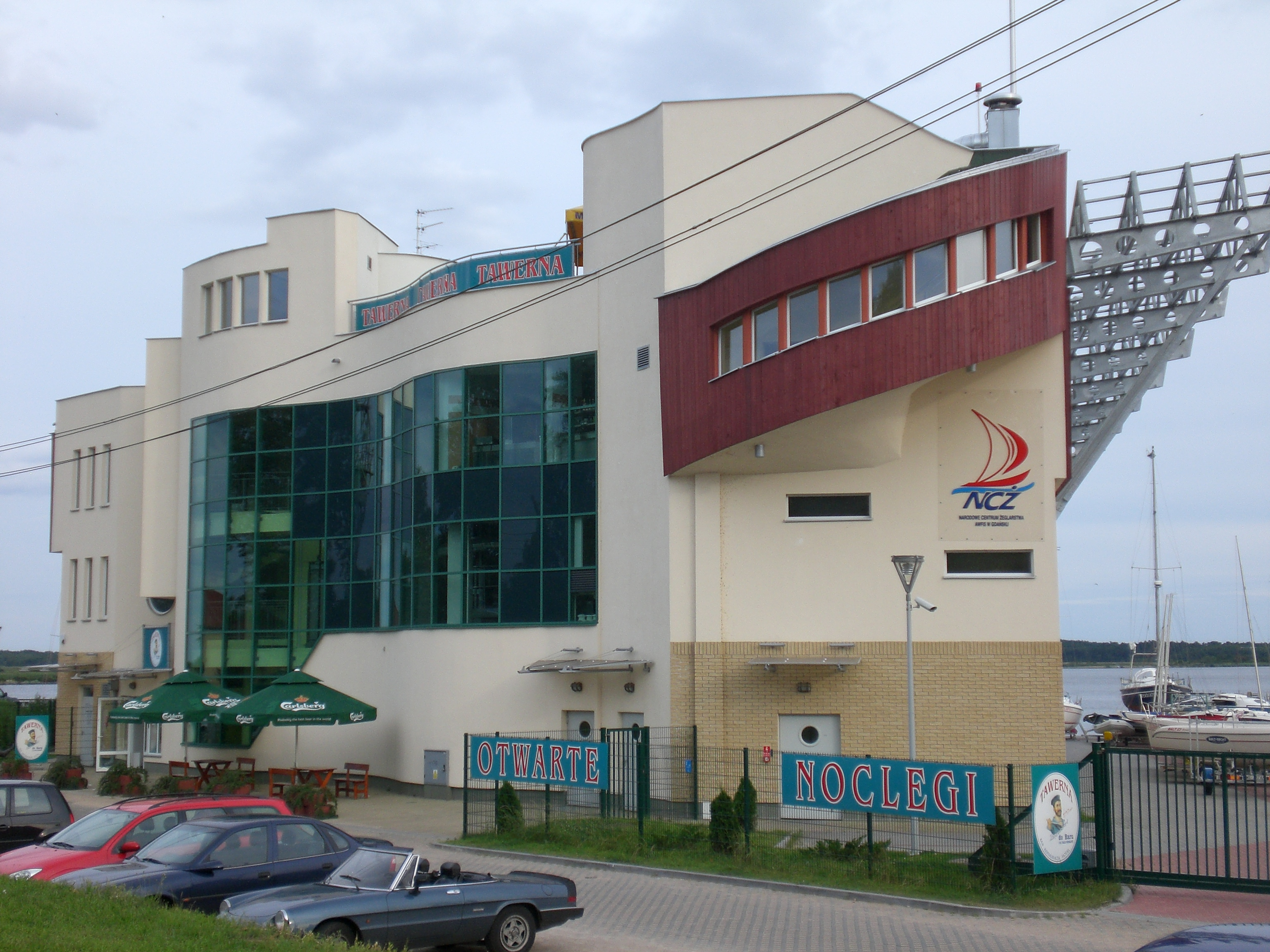
The main building of the National Centre for Sailing

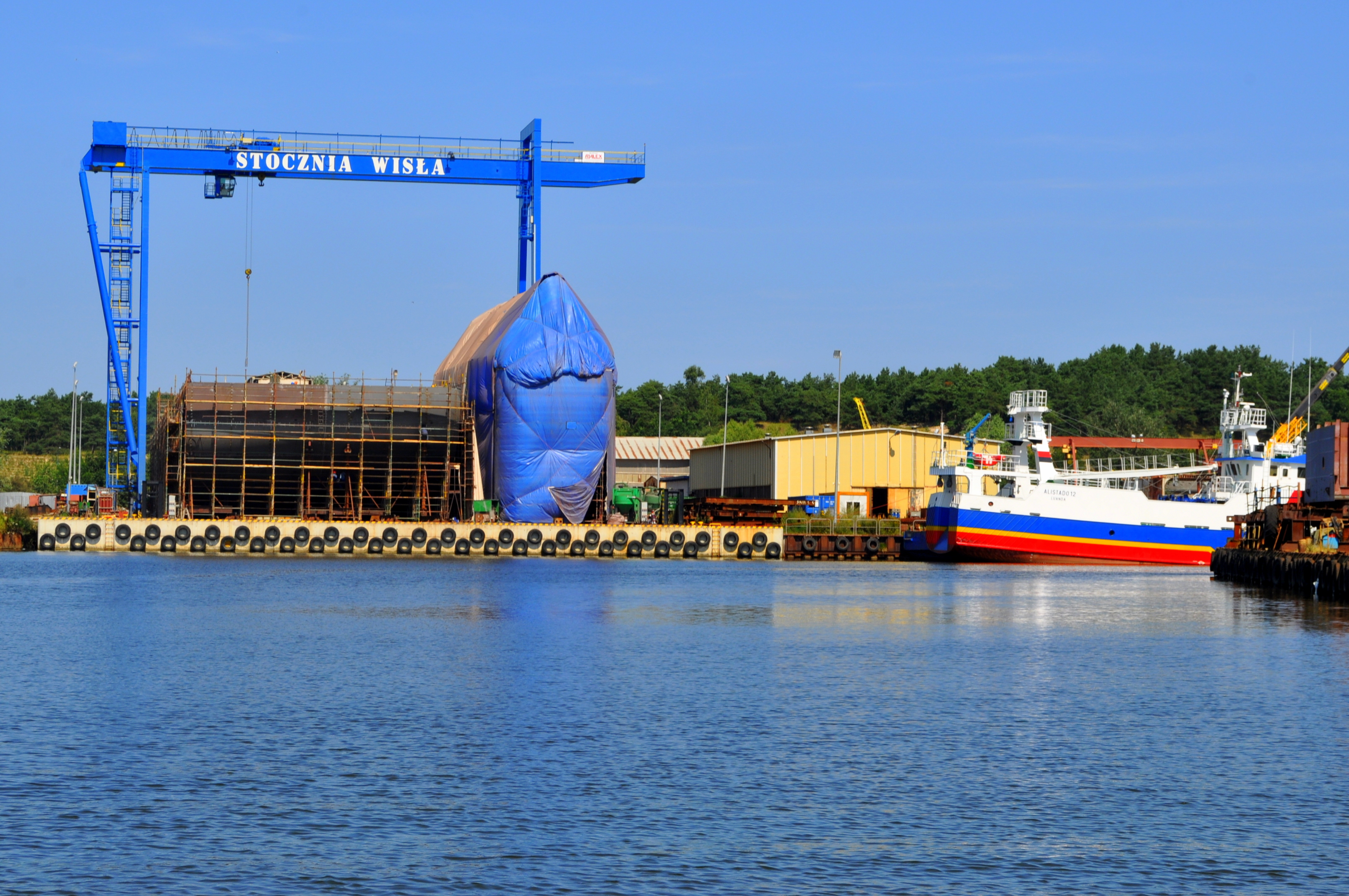
A shipyard on the shore of the Vistula
