= SY Poświst incident =

1948 incident involving sailing yacht

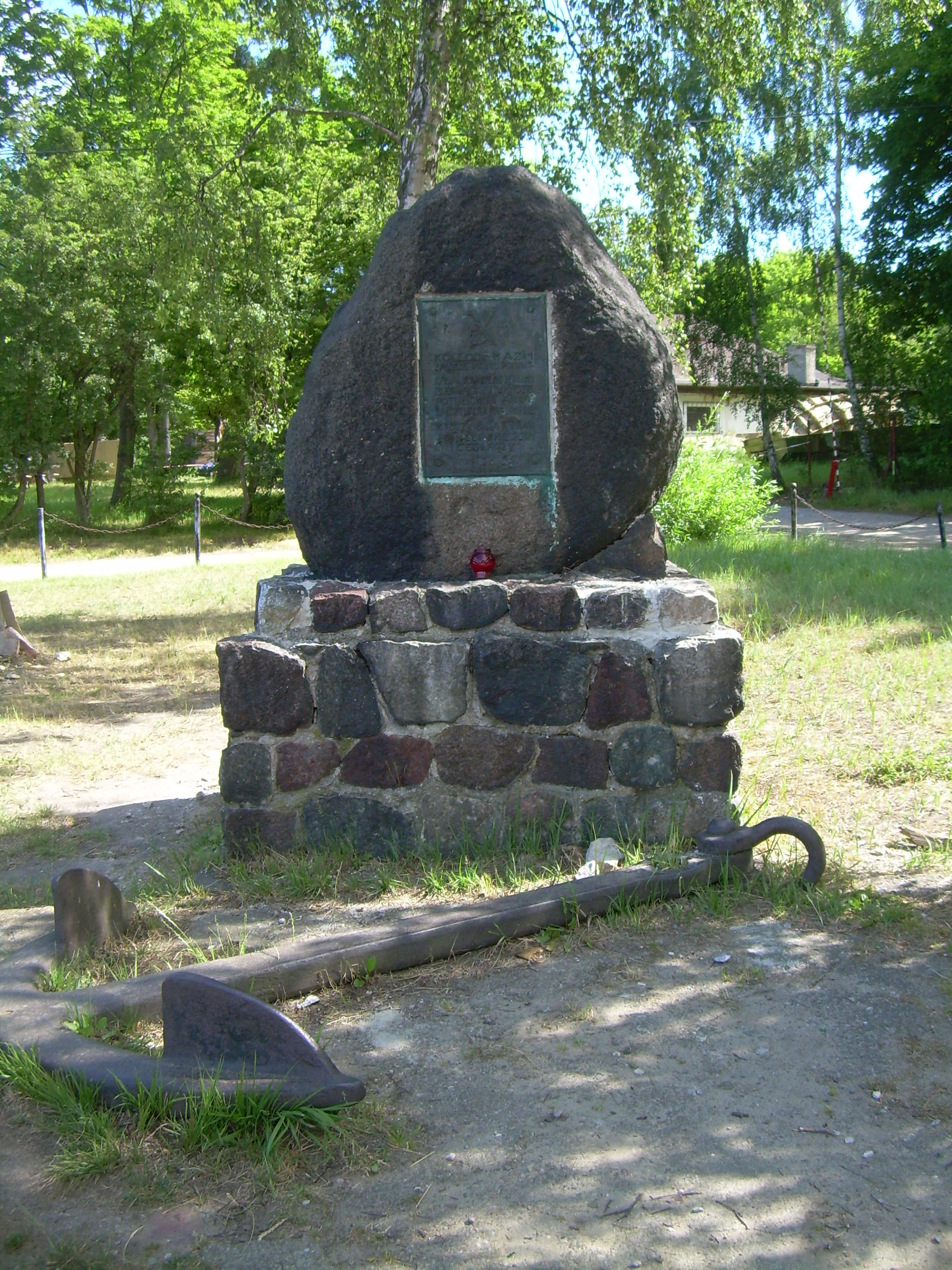
- Monument commemorating the incident
- Date: 3 August 1948
- Location: Bay of Gdańsk
- Cause: Detachment of ballast tank
- Deaths: 4

SY Poświst was a sailing yacht operated by the Academic Maritime Association (Polish: Akademicki Związek Morski) of Gdańsk which experienced a structural failure in the Bay of Gdańsk on 3 August 1948, killing four people out of its crew of five in a failed evacuation.

== Ship information ==
The yacht Poświst was a small, single-masted sloop, launched in a German shipyard in 1914. Further details about the ship are uncertain, but by 1948, it was operated by the aforementioned Academic Maritime Association, a sailing club organized by the students of the Gdańsk University of Technology.

== Final voyage and incident ==
On 3 August 1948, the Poświst was sailing under normal circumstances during a sailing camp event. Its crew of five consisted entirely of students, those being Jerzy Kawałkowki, Anna Potulicka, Magdalena Zakrzewska, Wanda Biernacka, and Bolesław Trochimowicz. At 20:00, whilst about 9 nautical miles (17 km) from the shore, the crew decided to return to Gdańsk. However, whilst turning back, a part of the keel suddenly detached, taking a ballast tank down along with it.

The yacht then rapidly tipped over. The crew, in violation of common maritime practice, decided not to stay onboard and call for help, but instead made the decision to evacuate the ship on makeshift rafts. The cold water led to three members of the crew dying of hypothermia whilst sailing to the shore—Zakrzewska, Potulicka, and Kawałkowski. After 15 hours at sea, the two survivors, Trochimowicz and Biernacka, were taken out of the water. Biernacka died while in the hospital, rendering Trochimowicz the incident's only survivor.

== Aftermath ==
The Poświst did not sink, and remained adrift until washing up on the shore of the Vistula Spit. A monument was later erected in front of the Wisłoujście Fortress in memory of the tragedy.
