= Nowy Port =

- District (dzielnica)
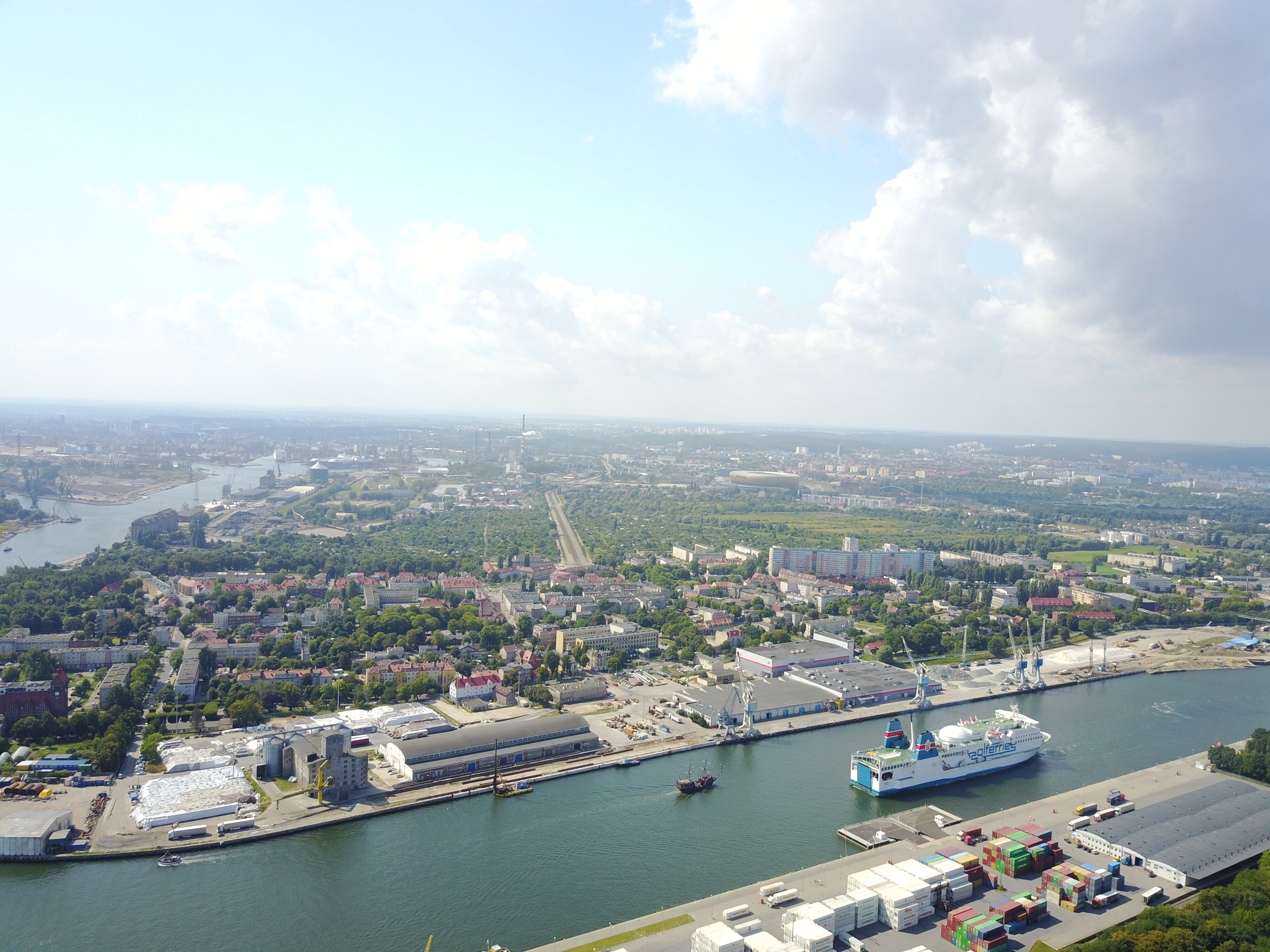
- Aerial view of Nowy Port

- Location of Nowy Port within Gdańsk
- Coordinates: 54°23′51″N 18°39′54″E
- Country: Poland
- Voivodeship: Pomeranian
- County/City: Gdańsk

Area
  - Total: 2.08 km^{2} (0.80 sq mi)

Population (2019)
  - Total: 9,334
  - Density: 4,490/km^{2} (11,600/sq mi)
- Time zone: UTC+1 (CET)
  - Summer (DST): UTC+2 (CEST)
- Vehicle registration: GD

Nowy Port (German: Neufahrwasser; Kashubian: Fôrwôter) is a district (dzielnica) of the city of Gdańsk, Poland, at the mouth of the Martwa Wisła.

== Location ==
Physically, Nowy Port is bound by the Martwa Wisła to the north and east. Administratively, it borders Brzeźno to the west, Letnica to the south, and Przeróbka to the east and north. It is not divided into any quarters (osiedla).

== History ==
The land that is today known as Nowy Port was underwater as late as the 16th century, covered by the waters of the Bay of Gdańsk. Increasing deposition of sediment by the Vistula River, as well as passing ships dumping the rocks and sand within their cargo holds near the mouth of the river, led to an island forming. Right next to it formed a water body known as the Neufahrwasser, meaning New Water Track in German, which became the area's name in that language.

Up to 1783, Neufahrwasser was owned by the Oliwa Abbey. In 1772, during the First Partition of Poland, the Kingdom of Prussia took Neufahrwasser, whereas the city of Danzig (Gdańsk) proper remained within the Polish–Lithuanian Commonwealth. In order to compete with the city of Danzig and thus economically weaken it, the Prussians developed Neufahrwasser's port significantly, encouraging sailors to deposit their cargo near the mouth of the Vistula; this succeeded, resulting in the city capitulating and eventually being seized during the Second Partition of Poland.

Even after Danzig became part of Prussia as well, and Neufahrwasser was incorporated into the city in 1814, the port remained significant and retained its industrial character. In 1867, a rail line from central Danzig was connected to Danzig Neufahrwasser railway station, which was later known as Gdańsk Nowy Port railway station and closed in 2002.

In the late 19th and early centuries, a sizeable Polish community grew in Neufahrwasser, with 3,000 of its 13,339 inhabitants as of 1924 being Polish. During the siege of Danzig in 1945, as much as 60% of Neufahrwasser was damaged. Renamed to Nowy Port following the seizure of German lands by the new Polish government, it did not retain its seaside character, and was placed under heavy surveillance. In 2008, a revitalization project began of Nowy Port, which has continued to this day.

== Gallery ==
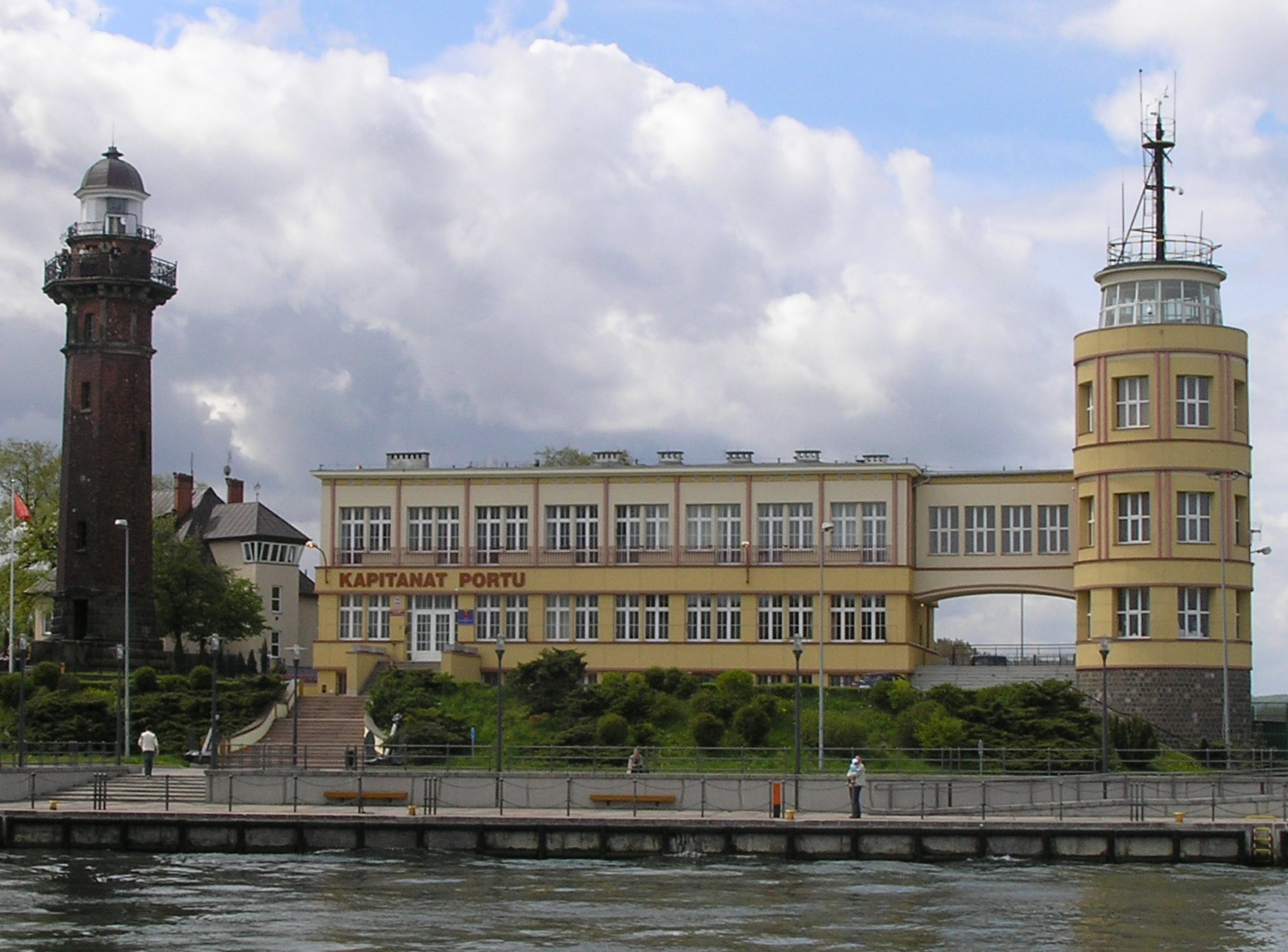
Port office and lighthouse

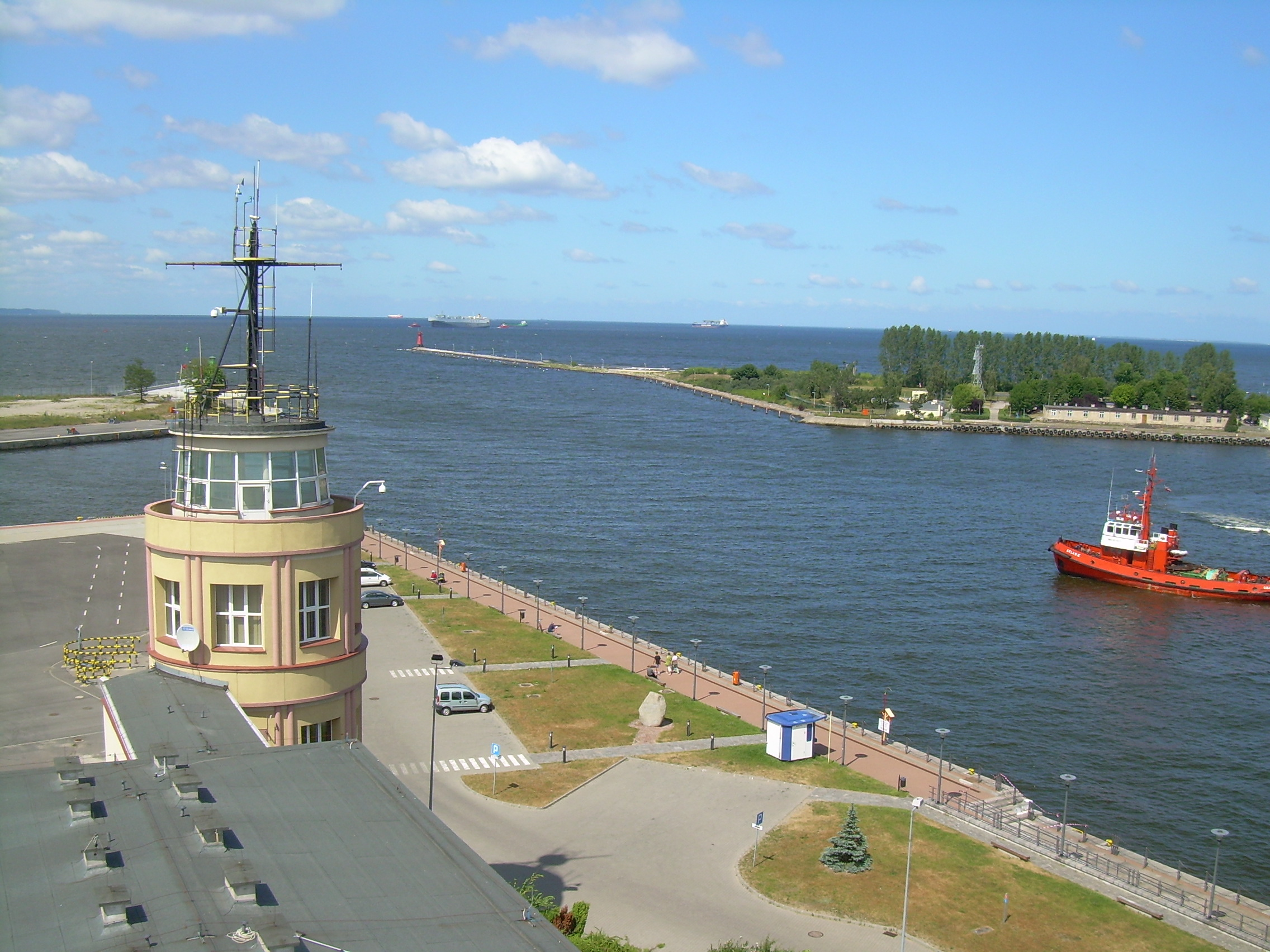
Port office and mouth of the Martwa Wisła

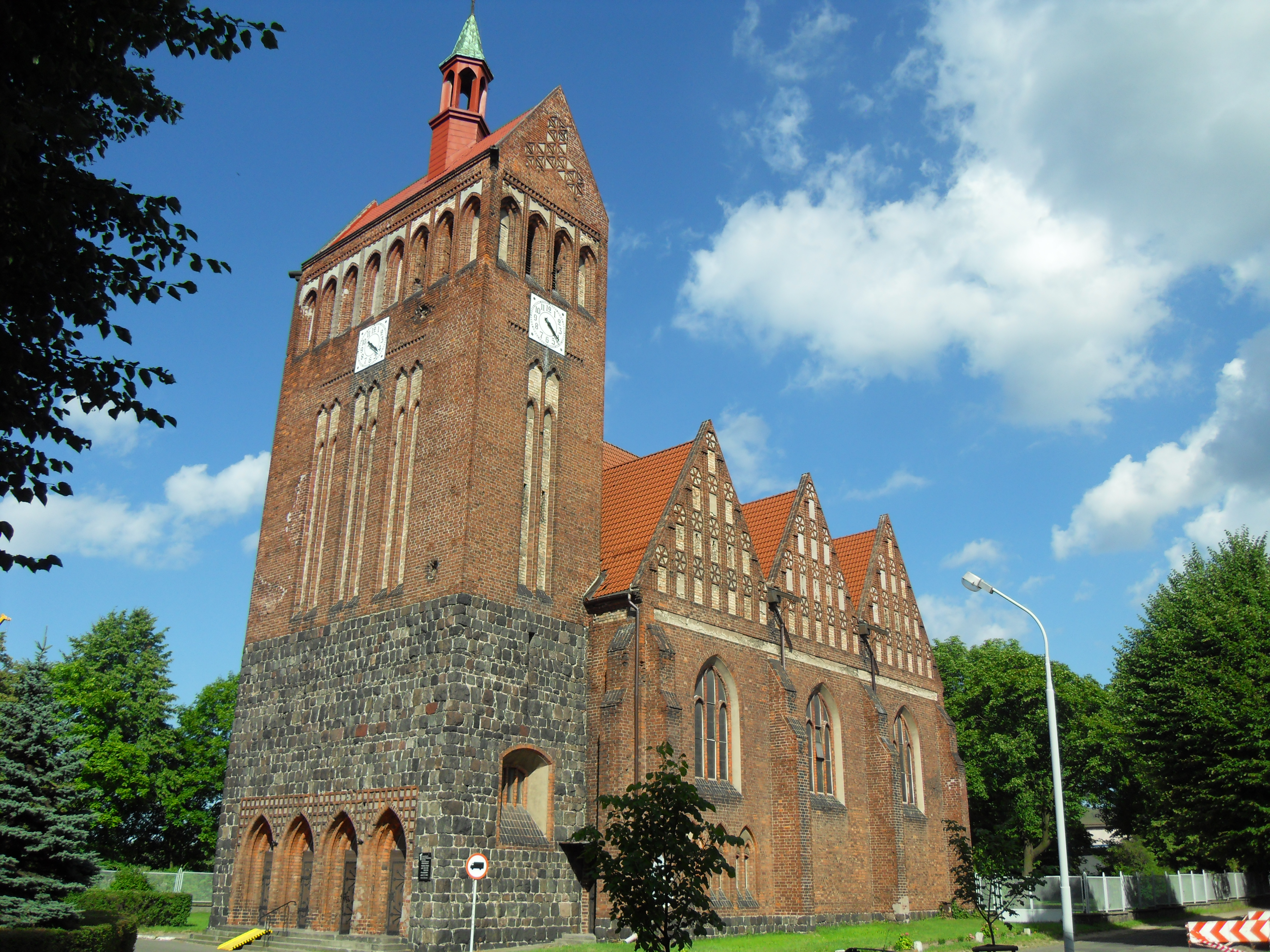
Franciscan Church of the Immaculate Heart of Mary

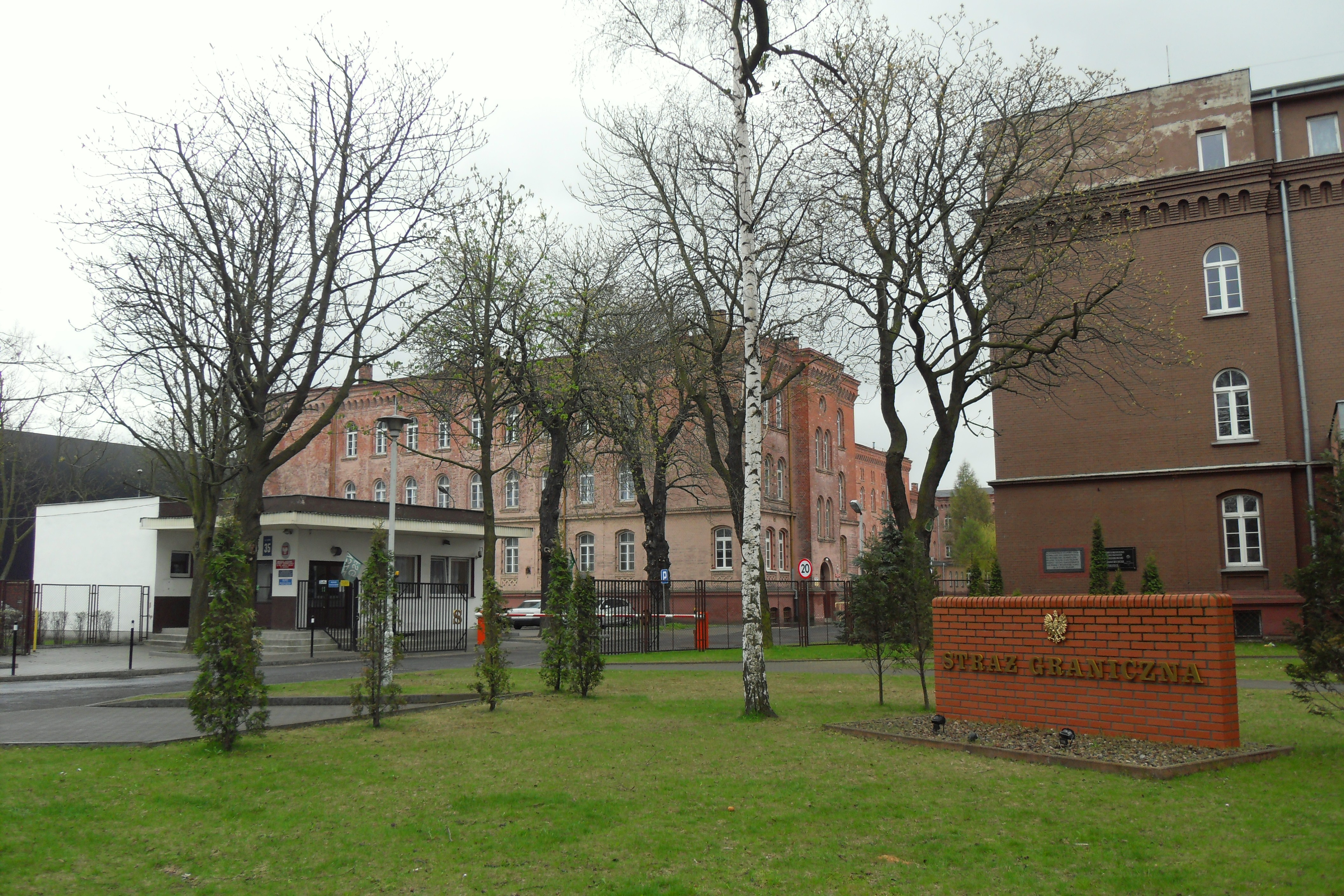
Polish Border Guard unit
