= Sobieszewo Island =

Coordinates: 54°20′11″N 18°52′29″E

- District (dzielnica)
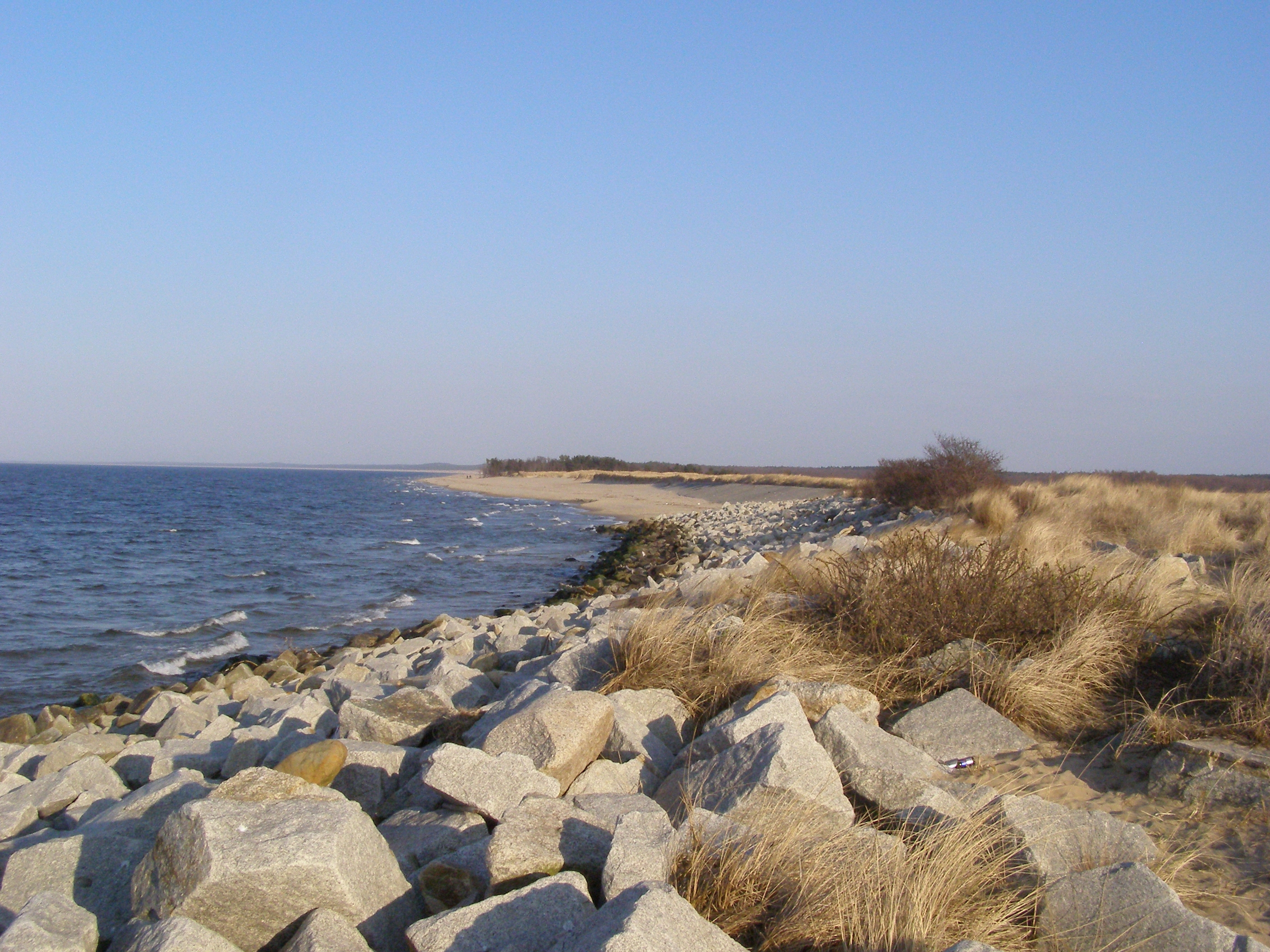
- Messina Spit on Sobieszewo Island

- Location of Sobieszewo Island within Gdańsk
- Country: Poland
- Voivodeship: Pomeranian
- County/City: Gdańsk

Area
  - Total: 35.79 km^{2} (13.82 sq mi)

Population (2011)
  - Total: 3,484
  - Density: 97.35/km^{2} (252.1/sq mi)
- Time zone: UTC+1 (CET)
  - Summer (DST): UTC+2 (CEST)
- Postal code: 80-506; 80-528
- Area code: +48 58

Sobieszewo Island (Polish: Wyspa Sobieszewska; Kashubian: Sobieszewsczi Òstrów; formerly German: Bohnsack) is an island on the Baltic Sea, bounded by the Gdańsk Bay and the Vistula River. It is part of the city of Gdańsk.

== Location ==
Sobieszewo Island is bounded by the Bay of Gdańsk to the north, the Martwa Wisła to the south, the Przekop Wisły to the east, and the Śmiała Wisła to the west. Administratively, it borders Krakowiec-Górki Zachodnie and Rudniki to the west, Gmina Pruszcz Gdański and Gmina Cedry Wielkie to the south, and Gmina Stegna to the east. It comprises the quarters (osiedla) of Górki Wschodnie, Komary, Orle, Przegalina, Sobieszewko, Sobieszewo, Sobieszewska Pastwa, Świbno, and Wieniec.

== History ==
The settlements on what is today Sobieszewo Island, including Sobieszewo, existed long before the island itself did. The first mention of the village of Sobieszewo comes from c. 1400, where an inn is mentioned as being found in Bonensak (variation of its German name, Bohnsack). It was a segment of a larger spit for most of its history. It was partly cut off by flooding in 1840, with the flooding creating the Śmiała Wisła. Then, from 1890 to 1895, the Przekop Wisły (Weichseldurchstich) was constructed, making it an island.

The island remained mostly rural, although, in the summer, tourists were not an uncommon sight. The German troops stationed on the island only surrendered on 8 May 1945, although it is also said that some lasted until mid-May. As of 1946, the island had 776 inhabitants. In 1973, it became part of the city of Gdańsk proper. From 1998 to 2007, sewage treatment was introduced to the island.

== Scouting and Guiding ==
The island is the venue for the Polish Scouting and Guiding Association's (ZHP) bid to host the 26th World Scout Jamboree in 2027. It was the venue of the European Jamboree 2020.

== Gallery ==
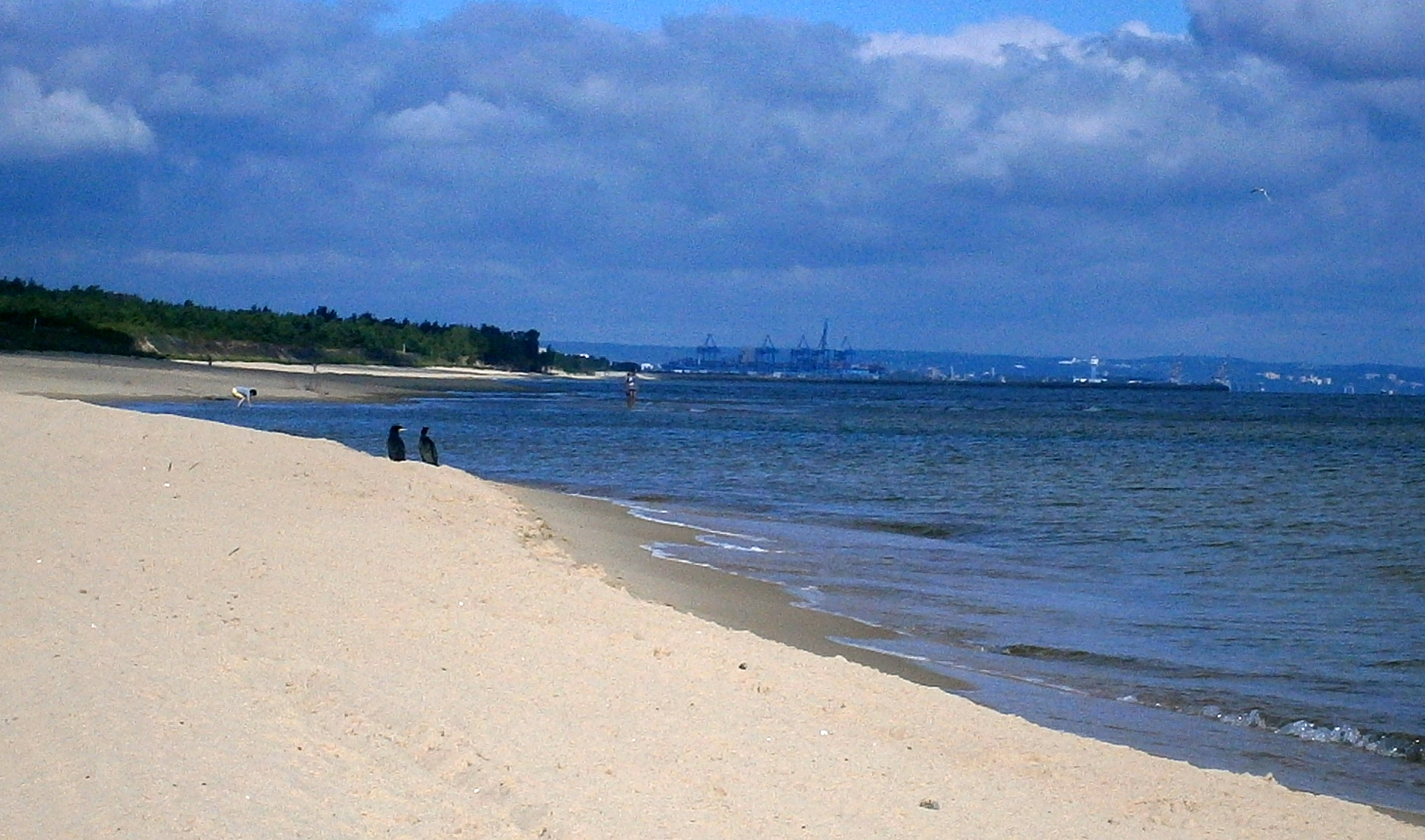
Beach in Sobieszewo

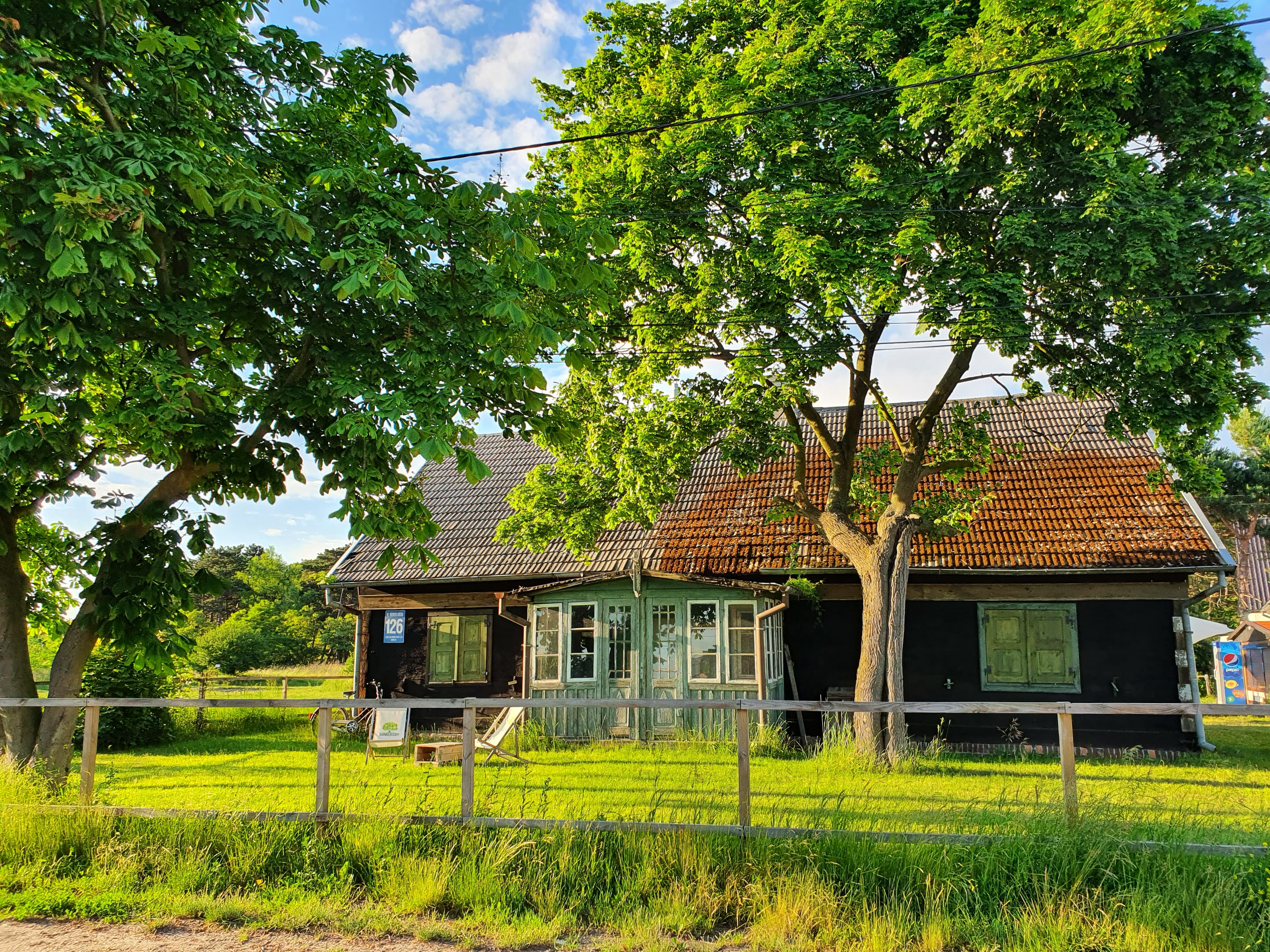
Old fisherman's hut on Górki Wschodnie

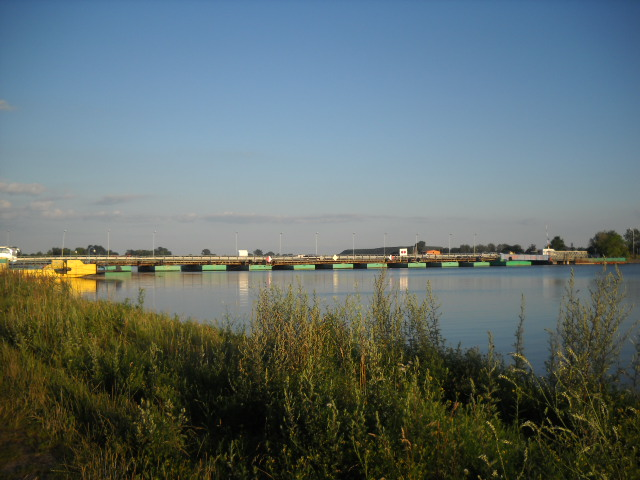
Pontoon bridge across Martwa Wisła, dismantled in 2018

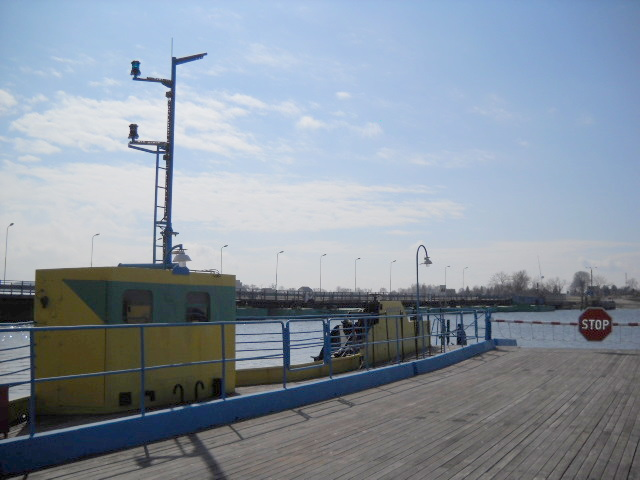
Ferry by the pontoon bridge in Sobieszewo

== See also ==
- Quarters of Gdańsk
