= Leniwka =

River in Poland

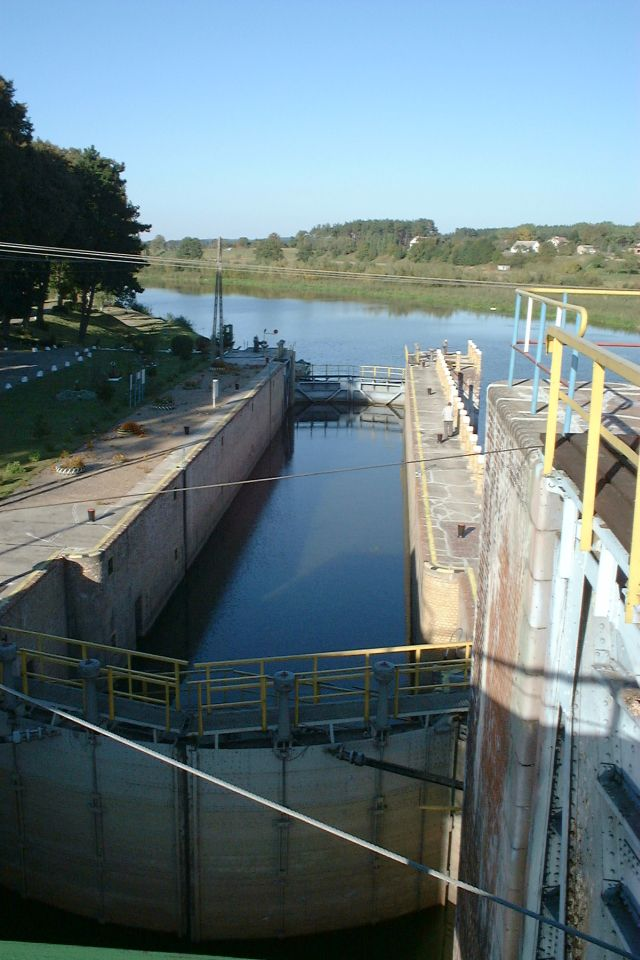
- The lock separating Leniwka and Nogat

Location
- Country: Poland
- Voivodeship: Pomeranian Voivodeship

Physical characteristics
- Length: 55.4 kilometres (34.4 mi)

Basin features
- River system: Vistula

The Leniwka (Polish pronunciation: [lɛˈɲifka], German: Mühlengraben) is the former name of the western branch of the Vistula (now Vistula) in northern Poland. It is 55.4 kilometres (34.4 mi) long, and flows into Gdańsk Bay, forming the borders of Sobieszewo Island. The Leniwka begins behind the lock in Biała Góra, where the Nogat, the eastern branch, also originates. The current Martwa Wisła is part of the Leniwka.

Towns and villages on the Leniwka include:

- Piekło
- Biała Góra
- Tczew
- Lisewo Malborskie
- Koźliny
- Ostaszewo
- Kiezmark
- Drewnica
- Gdańsk
  - Gdańska Głowa
  - Przegalina
  - Świbno
- Mikoszewo
