= Rudniki, Gdańsk =

Rudniki
- District (dzielnica)
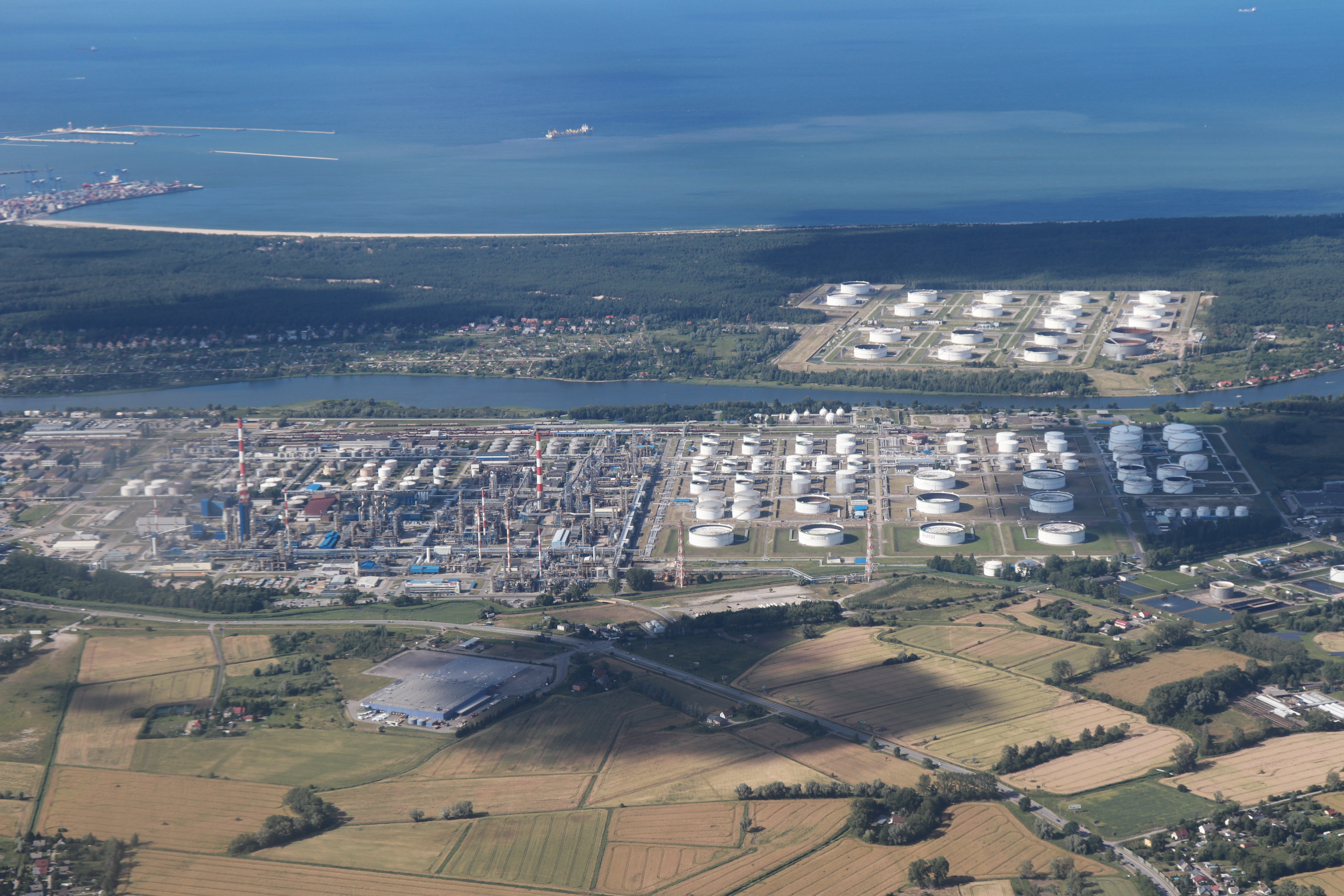
- Aerial view of Rudniki

- Location of Rudniki within Gdańsk
- Coordinates: 54°20′29″N 18°43′13″E
- Country: Poland
- Voivodeship: Pomeranian
- County/City: Gdańsk
- Within city limits: 1933

Area
  - Total: 14.66 km^{2} (5.66 sq mi)

Population (2019)
  - Total: 1,108
  - Density: 75.58/km^{2} (195.8/sq mi)
- Time zone: UTC+1 (CET)
  - Summer (DST): UTC+2 (CEST)
- Vehicle registration: GD

Rudniki is a district of Gdańsk, Poland, located in the eastern part of the city. It is a predominantly industrial district, located on the shore of the Vistula River. It is notable for containing the Gdańsk Refinery within its boundaries; much of the land outside of the refinery is rural.

== Location ==
Rudniki borders Przeróbka, Stogi, Krakowiec-Górki Zachodnie, and Wyspa Sobieszewska to the north, Gmina Pruszcz Gdański to the east and south, and Olszynka and Śródmieście to the west. To the north, it is additionally bounded by the Vistula. It consists of the quarters (osiedla) of Biały Dworek, Błonia, Gęsia Karczma, Kryzel, Miałki Szlak, Płonia Mała, Płonia Wielka, Reduta Płońska, Reduta Tylna, and Sienna Grobla II.

== History ==
Rudniki, located in the Vistula Fens, was uninhabited for most of its history, having been part of the city and known as the City Meadows (Bürgerwiesen) since medieval times. In 1936, Daheim, a housing estate for impoverished families, was built there. After World War II, it was made a district and named Rudniki, after Rudno, the Polish name for a village now within the district's borders. In 1971, the construction of a new oil refinery began, which was opened in 1975; the Gdańsk Refinery, located in Rudniki, is one of the largest in Poland.

Outside of the refinery, Rudniki is still primarily rural, although motorways and train tracks pass through the area.

== Gallery ==
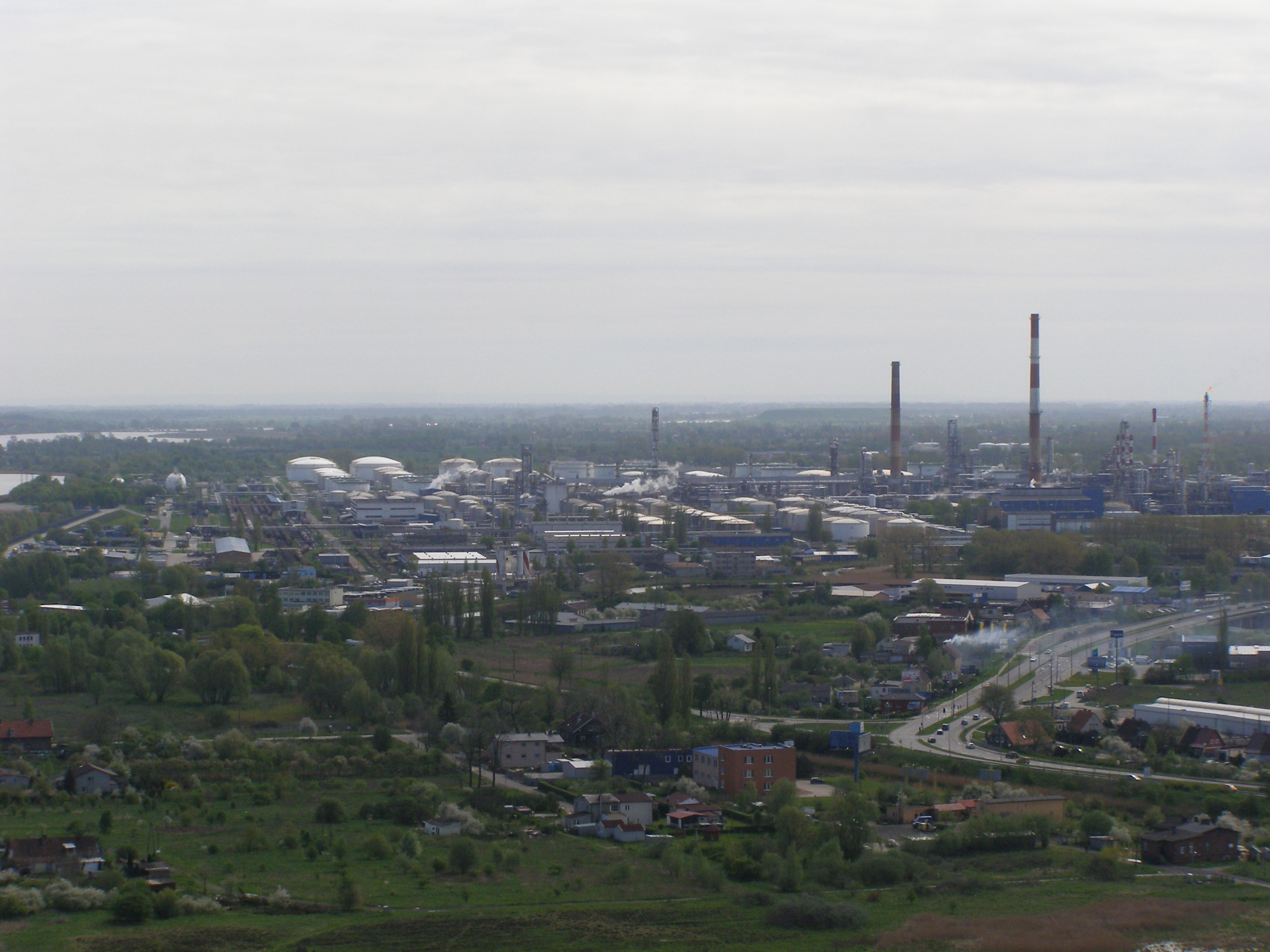
The Rudniki Refinery

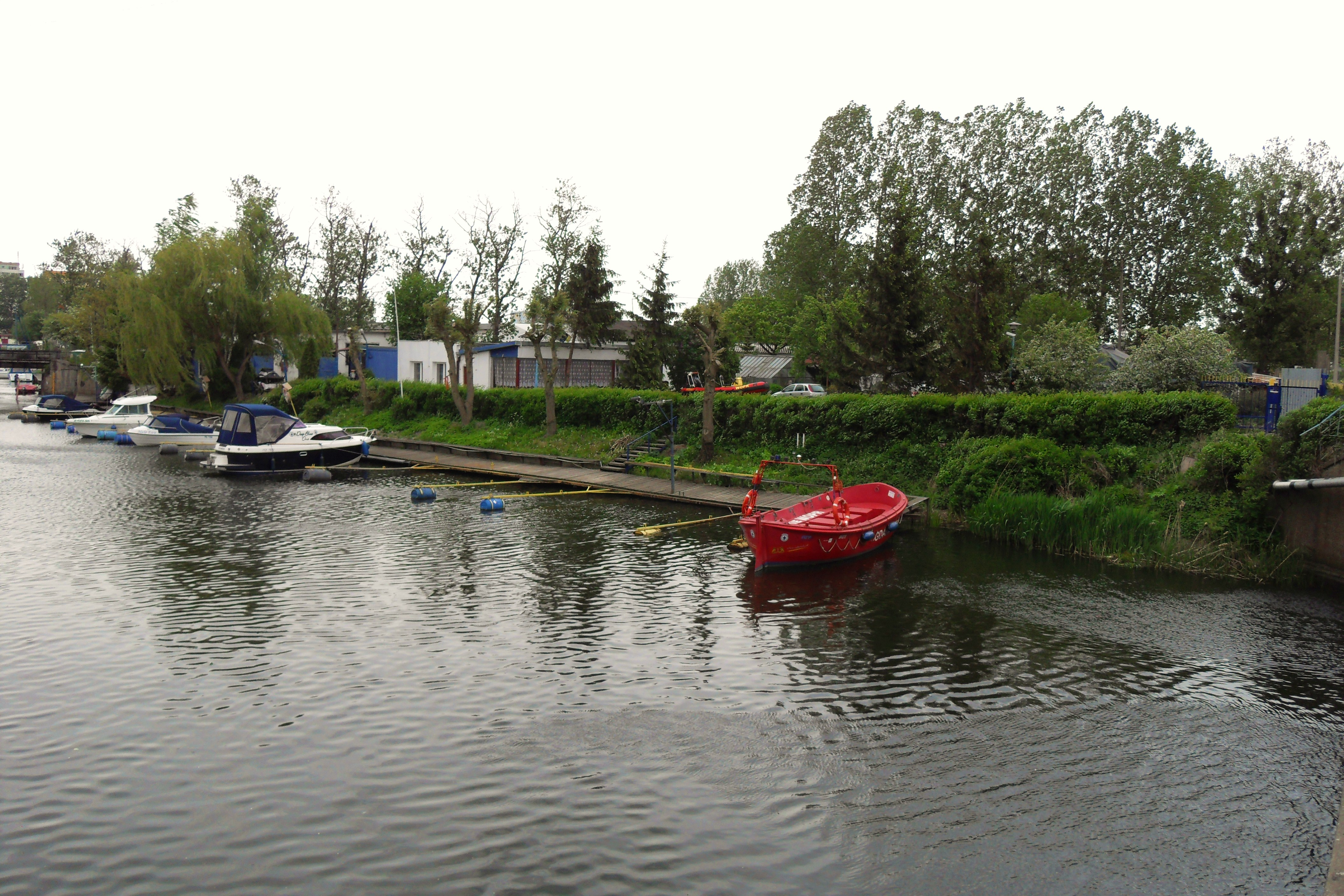
The shore of the Vistula River

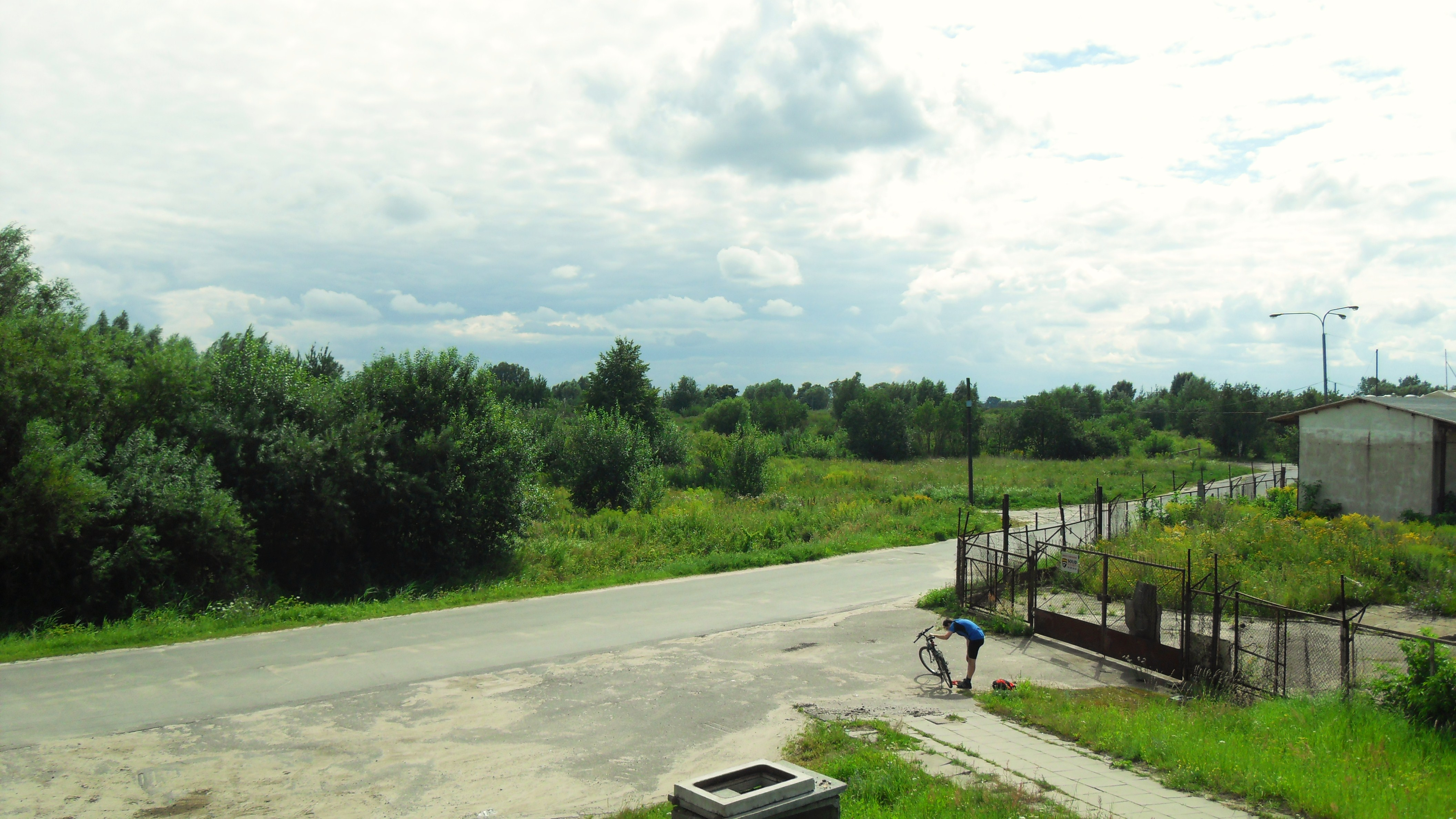
The rural parts of Rudniki
