= Śmiała Wisła =

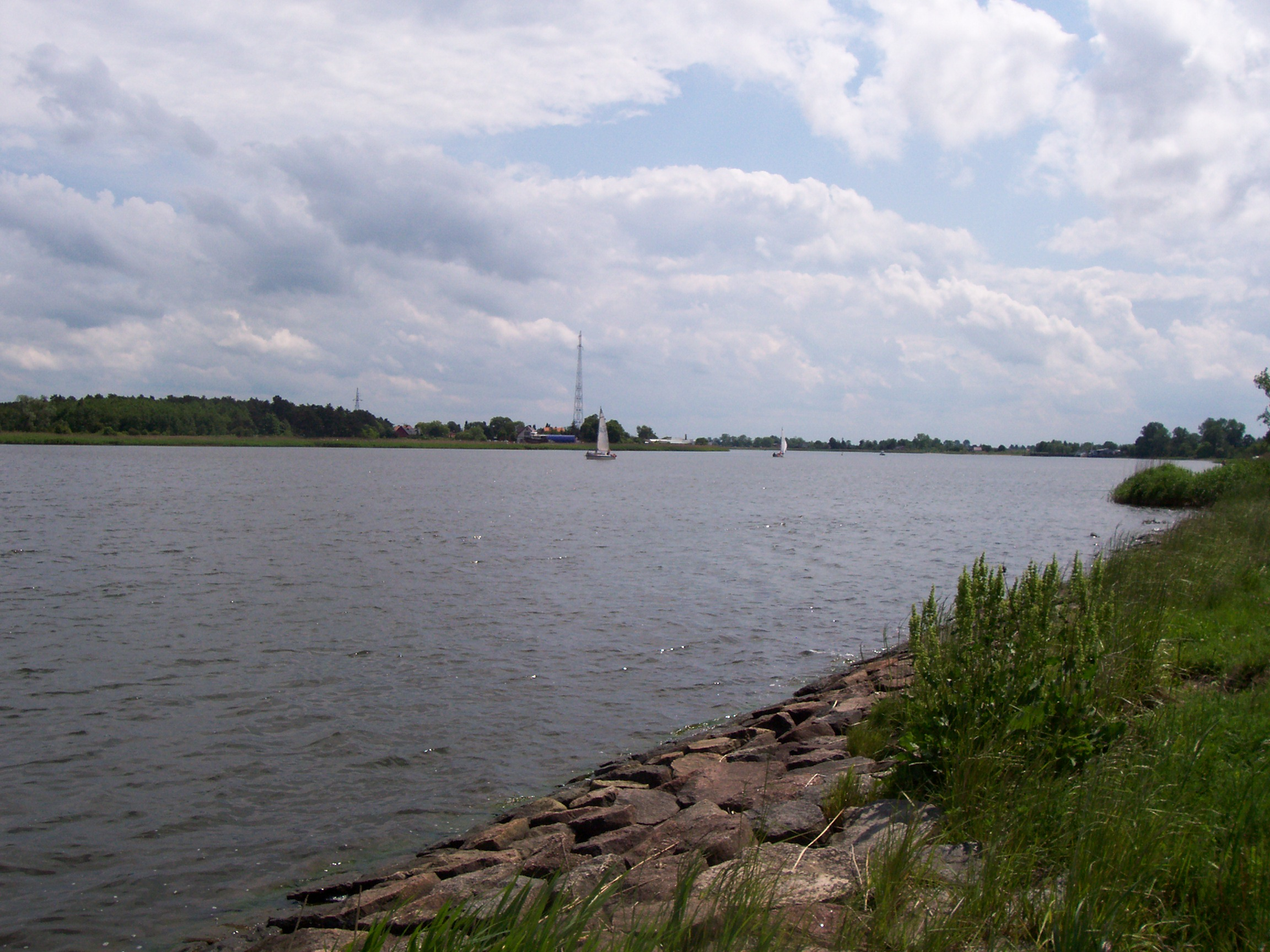

- Location of the mouth in Poland

Location
- Country: Poland
- Voivodeship: Pomeranian

Physical characteristics
- Source
  - location: Martwa Wisła
  - coordinates: 54°20′57″N 18°47′15″E
- Mouth
  - location: Gdańsk Bay
  - coordinates: 54°22′14″N 18°46′51″E
- Length: 25 km (16 mi)

The Śmiała Wisła (Polish pronunciation: [ˈɕmjawa ˈviswa]) is a distributary river branch of the Vistula in northern Poland that flows to the Gdańsk Bay.

The Śmiała Wisła is the western border of Sobieszewo Island and was created during the 1840 flooding when it became a new mouth of the Vistula. Literally it means Daring Vistula.
