= Wisłoujście Fortress =

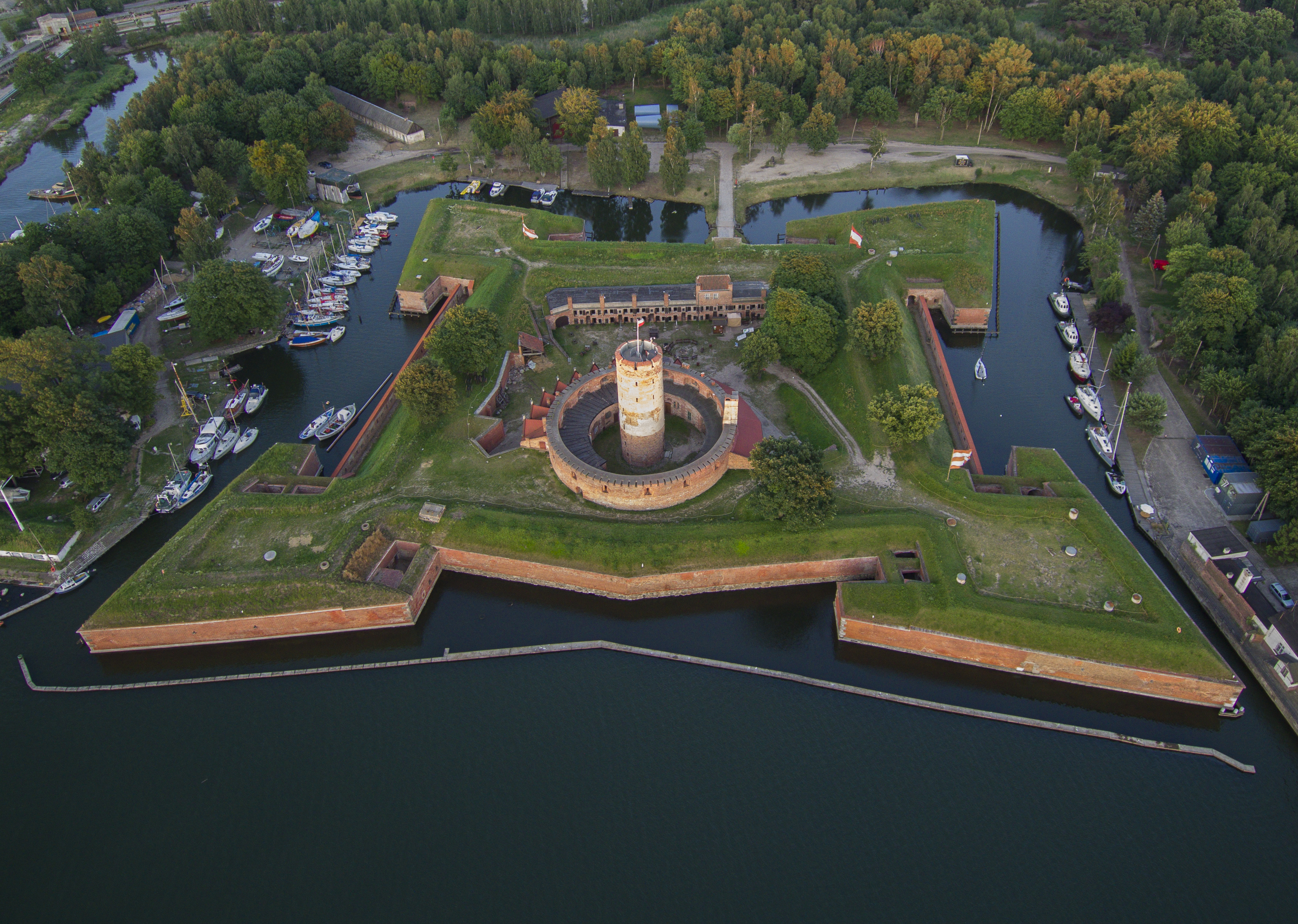
- Aerial view of the Wisłoujście Fortress

- Location of the Wisłoujście Fortress in Poland Wisłoujście Fortress (Pomeranian Voivodeship)
- 54°23′41″N 18°40′51″E
- Location: Gdańsk, Pomeranian Voivodeship in Poland

History
- Built: 1308

Historic Monument of Poland
- Designated: 2018-04-20
- Reference no.: Dz. U. z 2020 r. poz. 1288

Wisłoujście Fortress (Polish: Twierdza Wisłoujście, German: Festung Weichselmünde) is a historic fortress located in Gdańsk by the Martwa Wisła river, by an old estuary of the river Vistula, flowing into the Bay of Gdańsk. The fortress is located close to the Wisłoujście borough, Westerplatte and the Port Północny (Northern Port). It is listed as a Historic Monument of Poland.

== Description ==
Different parts of the fortress are clearly in different architectural styles (predominantly Gothic) and in different styles of construction and building materials. This is the result of the fortress being rebuilt every time it was destroyed or badly damaged. The basement and foundation of the fortress is based on wooden crates (kaszyce), which are hidden underneath in the water. Rubble was heaped on top of these structures to strengthen them, providing a stable and strong base for the fortress. The heart of the fortress is a circular tower (currently devoid of the coping), which until 1785 was used as a lighthouse. The lighthouse is surrounded by a brick flange (also known as a circular battery), whose inner walls are sealed together with the officers' living quarters. Around the battery there is a four-bastion Fort Carré, which is led by a gatehouse with a postern from 1609. The north-western side of the fort-carré is adjoined to the Martwa Wisła river, while the rest of the fortress is separated off from land by a sconce known as the Szaniec Wschodny (Eastern Sconce). The sconce is lined up with five bastions, two of which are ravelins - one of which survived. The Fort carré as well as the Eastern Sconce are surrounded by a moat, sourced by the Martwa Wisła river.

From about 1721 until 1889, the lighthouse tower was topped with a later-Baroque coping. After its burning due to a fire caused by lightning, the coping was reconstructed and coated with shale, which survived up until 1945. The tower also had formerly a clock, dating back to the eighteenth century.

In 1945, due to artillery strikes, the tower was almost completely destroyed, the coping and officers' headquarters and upper levels were also devastated. The only parts of the fortress which were left untouched, were the walls of the Fort Carré. In 1959 the tower was added to the Register of Heritage Sites, and reconstruction of the fortress began.

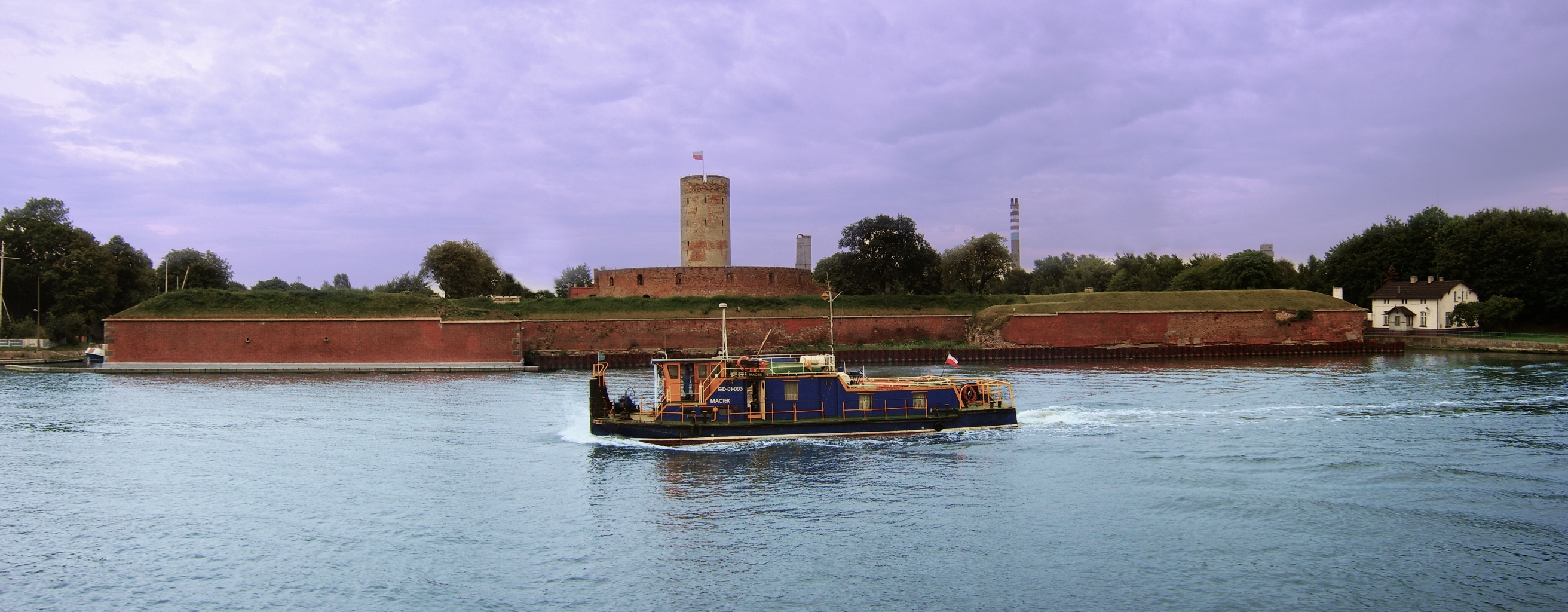
Fort Carré of the Wisłoujście Fortress with the lighthouse tower, as seen from the Martwa Wisła river

== History ==
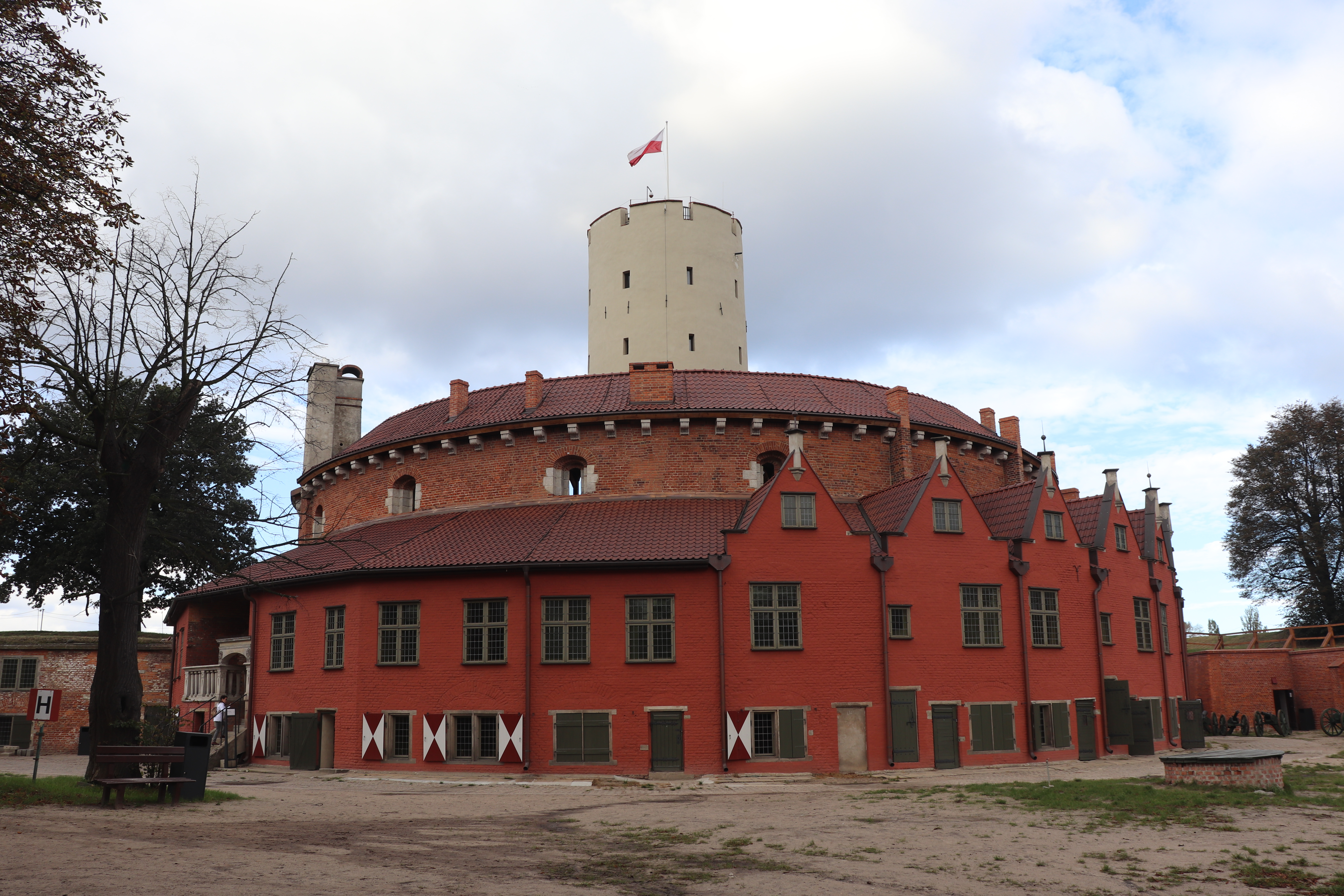
Lighthouse tower and its coping

Map of the Vistula estuary with Wisłoujście Fortress (c. 1750)

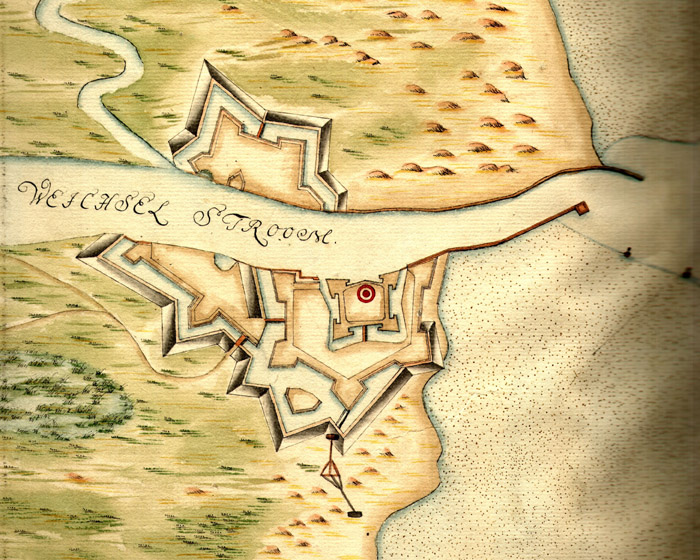
Plan of the Wisłoujście Fortress from 16 June 1642 by B. Hedding, painted in colour by Johann Gelentin in the first quarter of the eighteenth century

Following the Teutonic annexation Gdańsk, in the fourteenth century, a wooden fortress stood by the mouth of the river Vistula, flowing into the Baltic Sea; which was burnt down by a Hussite Sirotci raid, in September 1433. In 1482, a brick lighthouse tower was built in place of the former fortress. The tower was assigned to control the passage of ships, traveling to and from the Bay of Gdańsk's main port city of Gdańsk. The Wisłoujście Fortress was target for military campaigns. In 1577 the fortress was besieged several times by Stefan Batory, inconclusively, during the Battle of Oliwa (1627), when the fortress was cannonaded by a Swedish fleet; in 1734 by Russian-Saxon, in 1793 by Prussian, in 1807 by Napoleonic, and once again in 1814 by Prussian fleets. Between 1622-1629 the fortress was known as Latarnia (Lighthouse, Polish), under the name of a fortress - while actually being a naval base of the Polish–Lithuanian Commonwealth. On the night of 5–6 July 1628 the fortress was attacked with artillery fire, from a Swedish fleet traveling from Wisłoujście, into the fortress, sinking the vessel Złoty Lew (Golden Lion, Polish), and a galleon.

After the Second Partition of Poland, the fortress came under Prussian control, and from the 1820s it served as a prison, mainly for Polish political prisoners, including members of the resistance movement, protesters, insurgents of the November and January uprisings and refugees from the Russian Partition of Poland fleeing conscription into the Russian Army. Among the prisoners were Karol Marcinkowski, Gustaw Potworowski, Walenty Stefański and General Józef Szymanowski.
