= Martwa Wisła =

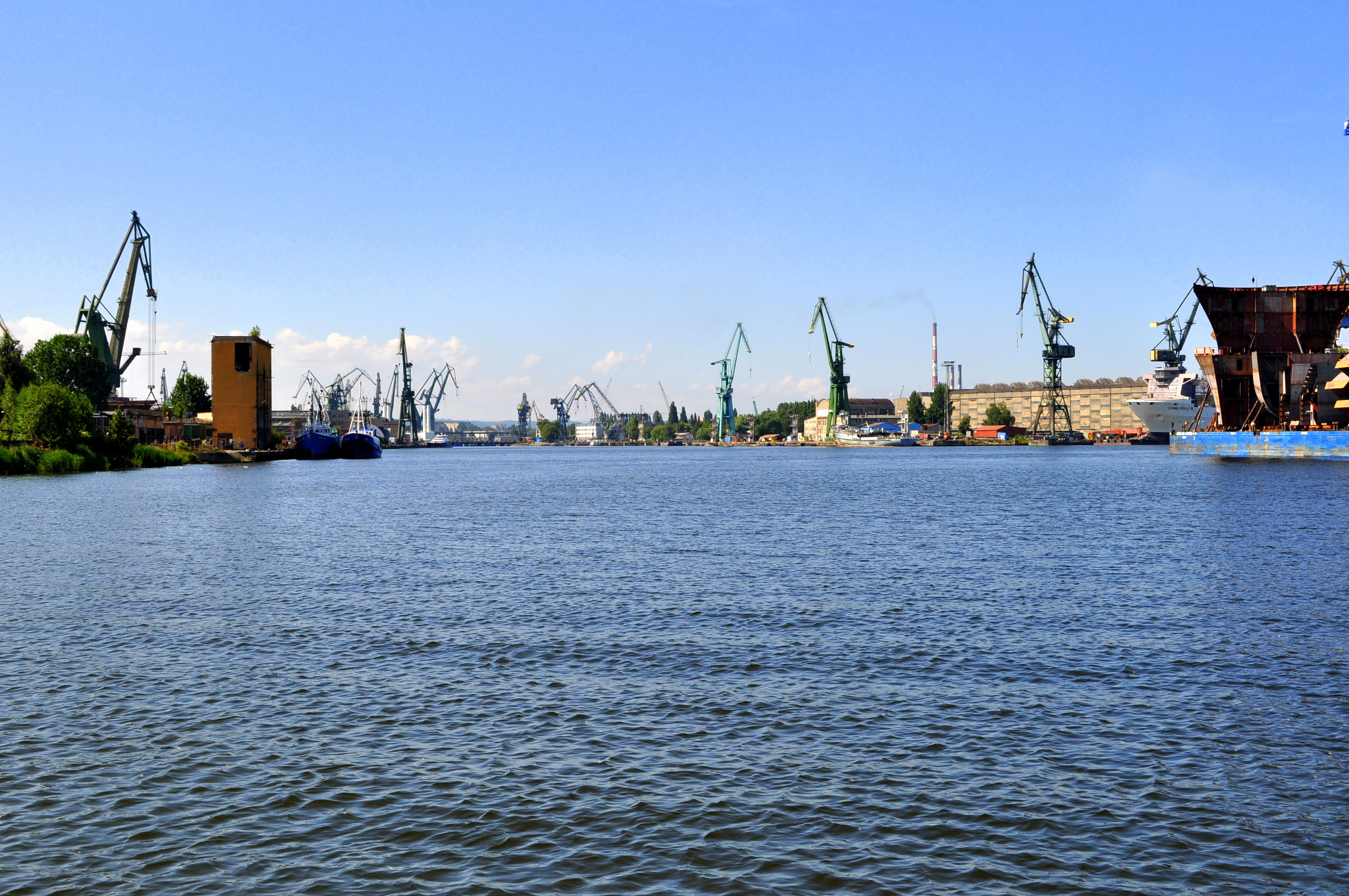

Location
- Country: Poland

Physical characteristics
- Source
  - location: Vistula
- Mouth
  - location: Baltic Sea
  - coordinates: 54.41°N 18.6608°E

The Martwa Wisła (Polish: [ˈmartfa ˈviswa]; German: Tote Weichsel; both literally "dead Vistula") is a river, one of the branches of the Vistula, flowing through the city of Gdańsk in northern Poland.

It got its name when this branch of the river became increasingly moribund. A harbor canal was dug up with the Westerplatte on one of the Martwa Wisła banks. It was constructed to flow through Gdańsk into the Gdańsk Bay. Its river mouth and environs double as a harbor channel for the Inner Port of the port of Gdańsk.

== See also ==
- Baltic Sea
- Battle of Westerplatte
- Wisłoujście Fortress
