= Gdańsk Bay =

Bay located in the Baltic Sea

Coordinates: 54°28′59″N 18°57′31″E

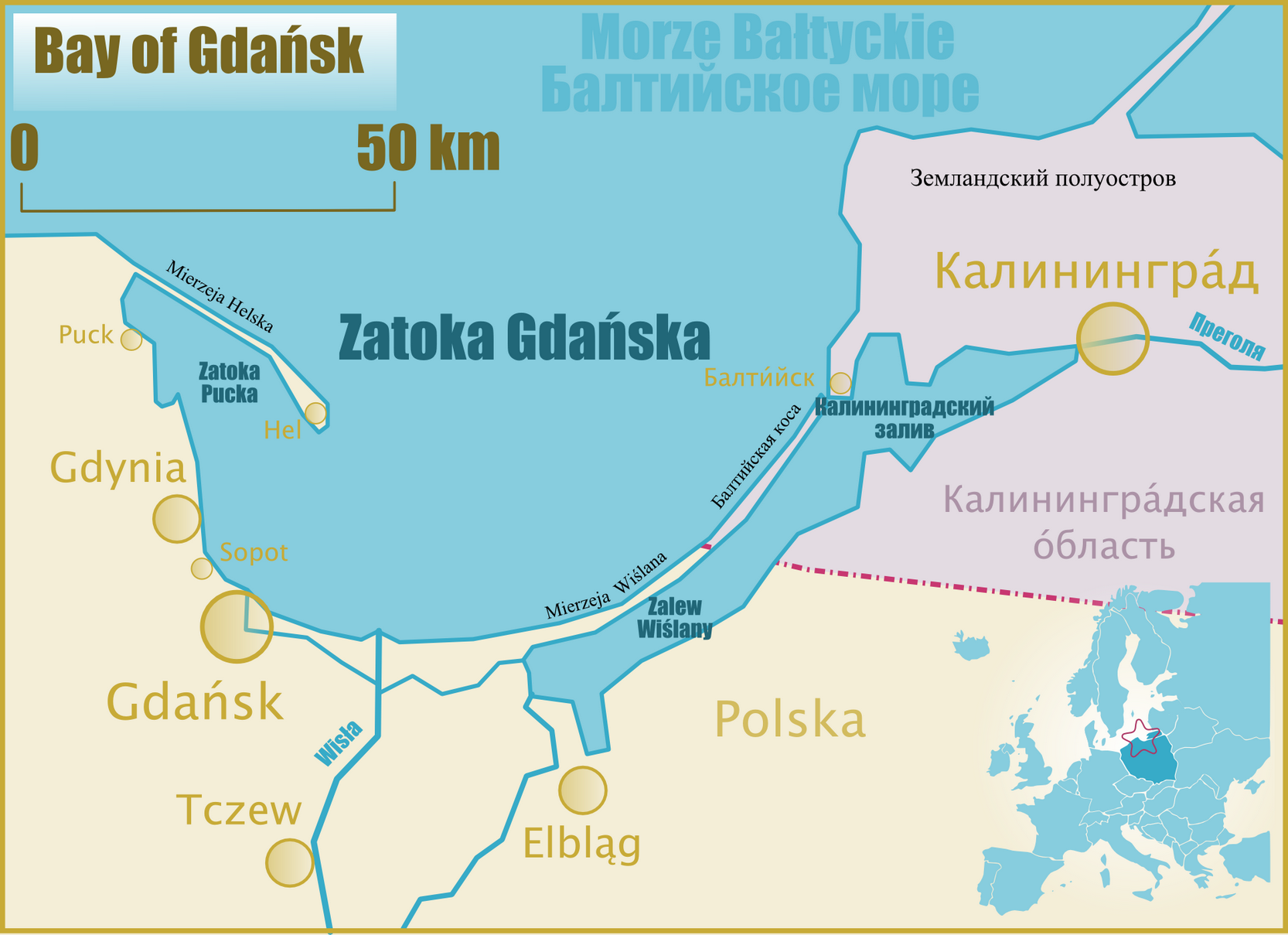
Gdańsk Bay

Gdańsk Bay or the Gulf of Gdańsk (Note: Polish: Zatoka Gdańska; Kashubian: Gduńskô Hôwinga; Lithuanian: Gdansko įlanka) is a southeastern bay of the Baltic Sea. It is named after the adjacent port city of Gdańsk in Poland.

== Geography ==
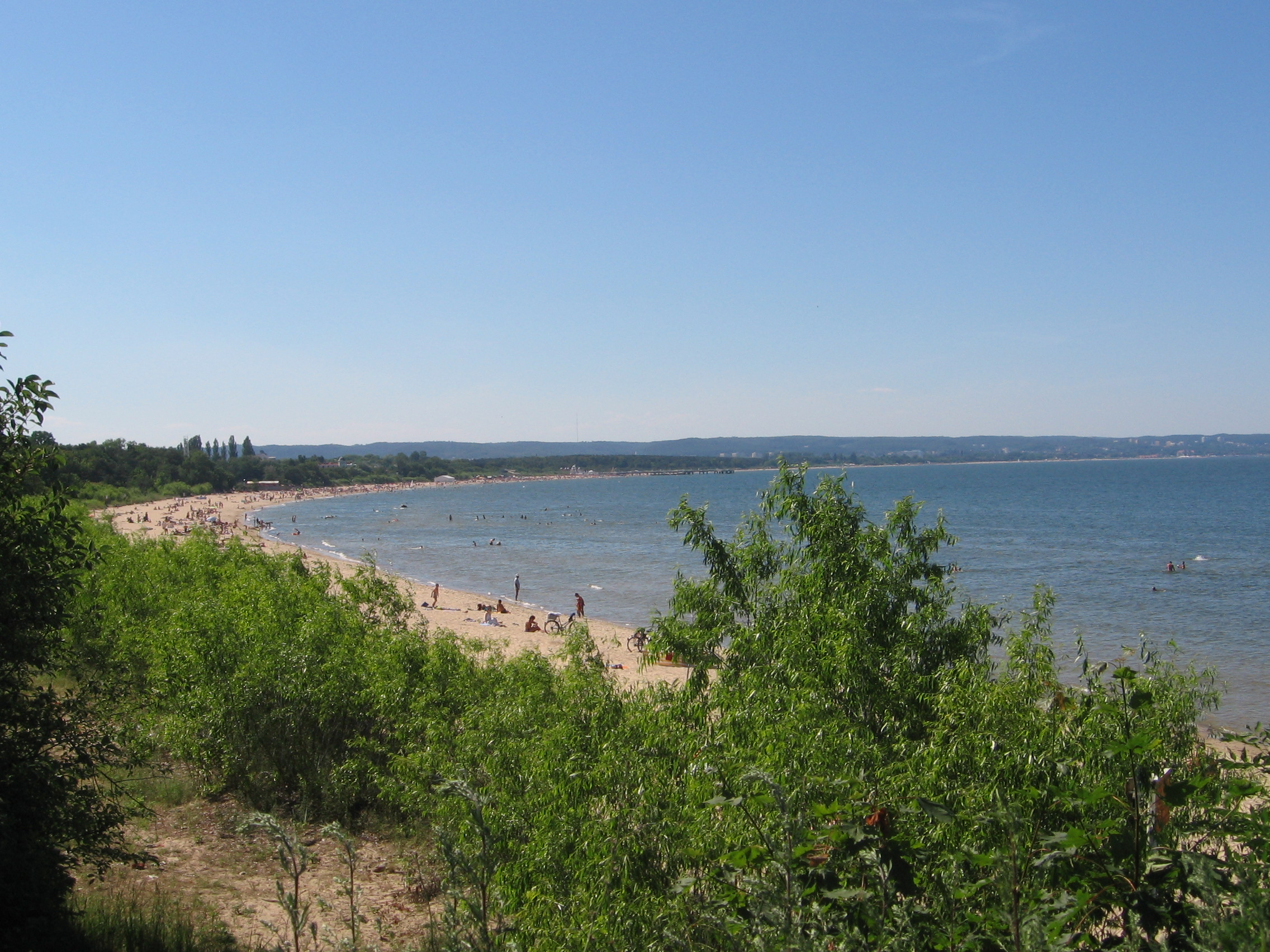
Gdańsk Bay is known for its beaches.

The western part of Gulf of Gdańsk is formed by the shallow waters of the Bay of Puck. The southeastern part is the Vistula Lagoon, separated by the Vistula Spit and connected to the open sea by the Strait of Baltiysk.

The bay is enclosed by a large curve of the shores of Gdańsk Pomerania in Poland (Cape Rozewie, Hel Peninsula) and the Kaliningrad Oblast of Russia (Sambian Peninsula). The coast of the bay features two very long sandspits, the Hel Peninsula and the Vistula Spit. The former defines the Bay of Puck, the latter defines the Vistula Lagoon.

The maximum depth is 120 metres and it has a salinity of 0.7%.

The major ports and coastal cities are Gdańsk, Gdynia, Puck, Sopot, Hel, Kaliningrad, Primorsk and Baltiysk. The main rivers of Gdańsk Bay are the Vistula and the Pregolya. The bay receives the waters of the Vistula direct via three branches—the Leniwka, the Śmiała Wisła and the Martwa Wisła—and indirectly via the Vistula Lagoon with two branches, the Nogat and the Szkarpawa.

== Nautic definition ==
By nautic definition, the Gulf of Gdańsk is much larger, including also the area of the Baltic Sea in front of the Russian exclave of Kaliningrad and the Lithuanian coast.

== History ==
The bayshore was the setting of a naval bombardment during the invasion of Poland, the first combat action of World War II.

=== Kursenieki ===
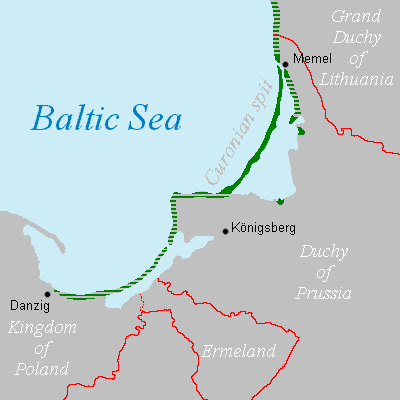
Curonian-populated area in 1649

Today the Kursenieki, also known as Kuršininkai, are a nearly extinct Baltic ethnic group living along the Curonian Spit. In 1649 Kuršininkai settlement spanned from Memel (Klaipėda) to Gdańsk. The Kuršininkai were eventually assimilated by the Germans, except along the Curonian Spit where some still live. The Kuršininkai were considered Latvians until after World War I when Latvia gained independence from the Russian Empire, a consideration based on linguistic arguments. This was the rationale for Latvian claims over the Curonian Spit, Memel, and other territories of East Prussia which would be later dropped.

== See also ==
- Battle of Oliwa
