= Oliwa Abbey =

Cistercian monastery in Oliwa, Poland

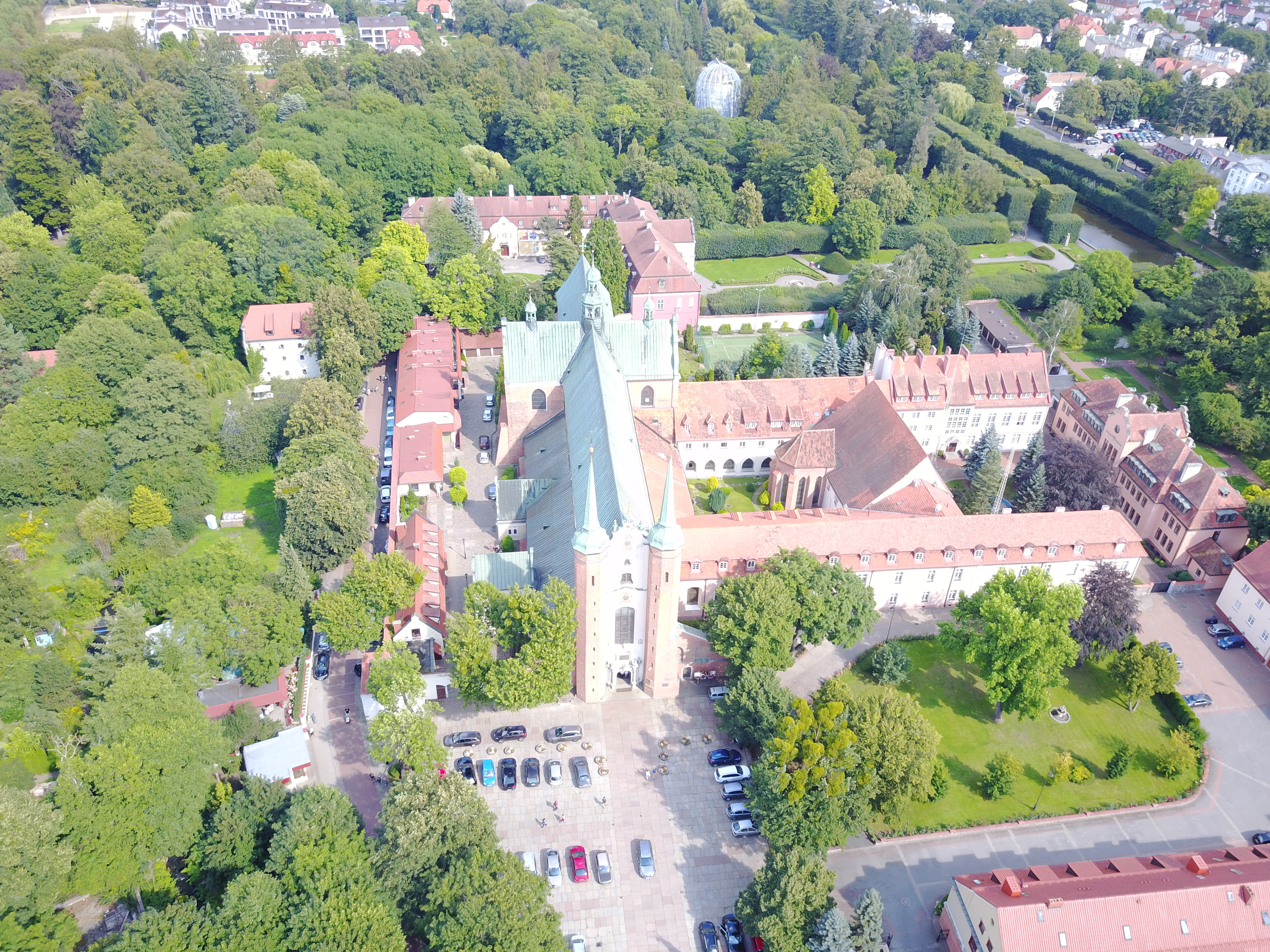
- Cistercian monastery in Oliwa

- Location within Poland
- Interactive map of Oliwa Abbey

Monastery information
- Order: Cistercians
- Denomination: Catholic Church
- Established: 1188
- Disestablished: 1831
- Controlled churches: Oliwa Cathedral

People
- Founder: Sambor I, Duke of Pomerania

Site
- Location: Oliwa, Gdańsk, Poland
- Coordinates: 54.4107158°N 18.5583276°E

The Oliwa Abbey was the Cistercian monastic community in Oliwa (now a district of Gdańsk), the oldest monastic establishment in Gdańsk Pomerania, which existed continuously from 1188 to 1831, now a Historic Monument of Poland.

The monastery buildings were repeatedly destroyed by pagan Prussians, Brandenburgers, Teutonic Knights, Hussites, Swedes, Russians, and the people of Gdańsk itself. From 1466 to 1772 it consistently sided with the Polish–Lithuanian Commonwealth in its ongoing disputes with Gdańsk. In the twilight years of its existence, the abbey became part of the Kingdom of Prussia in 1772 following the First Partition of Poland. Due to Prussian dissolution policies, the Cistercian order was abolished in 1831.

== Establishment ==
From the mid-12th century, numerous Cistercian monasteries were established in the Polish lands, especially in Greater Poland, Pomerania, western Lesser Poland, and Silesia: Łekno (1153), Lubiąż (1163), Kołbacz (1173), Ląd (1173), Sulejów (1176), Wąchock (1179), Koprzywnica (1185), Mogiła (1222), Henryków (1227), and others. Somewhat later, a few Cistercian convents were established: Trzebnica (1203), Ołobok (1211), and Owińska (1250).

The composition of the convents was overwhelmingly foreign. The Cistercians of Lesser Poland originated from Morimond in Burgundy (now in Champagne), and until the late Middle Ages, French and Italians predominated here. In the convents in other regions, there were mostly Germans – only the citizens of Cologne were admitted to the Greater Polish Łekno, Ląd, or Obra (1240) (a filial of the Cistercian abbey in Altenberg near Cologne). In Kołbacz and its subsequent filials, Danes dominated.

Without the orders – both in terms of secular and ecclesiastical authorities – the process of civilization and Christianization of the Polish territories would undoubtedly have proceeded much more slowly. The monks brought with them a broad knowledge of literature, architecture, agriculture, various crafts, and, above all, management. Their activities laid the foundation for the structure of the Piast states during the period of territorial fragmentation.

The idea of bringing the Cistercians to Pomerania is attributed in the chronicles of the Oliwa Abbey to the Gdańsk duke Sobieslaw I. In reality, the founder was the son of Sobieslaw, Duke Sambor I, who in 1186 brought them from Kołbacz: The Pomeranian Duke Sambor settled the Cistercian order in a place called Oliwa. The group of monks was led by the Dane Bernard Dithard, who became the first abbot. The Kołbacz Abbey was a filial of the Danish Esrum Abbey, so the monks who came to Oliwa were probably mostly from Denmark.

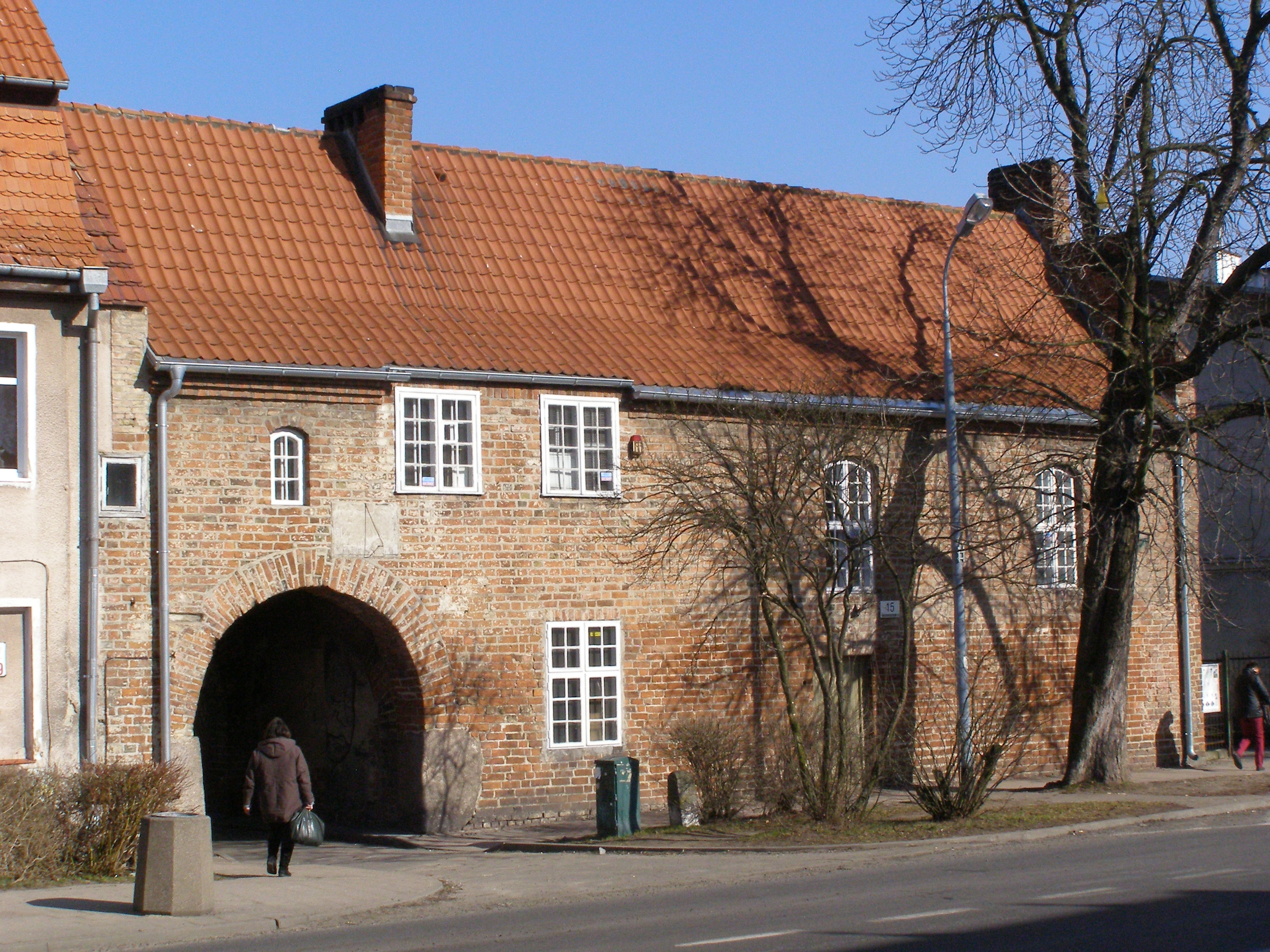
Gate House, the former main gate of the monastery

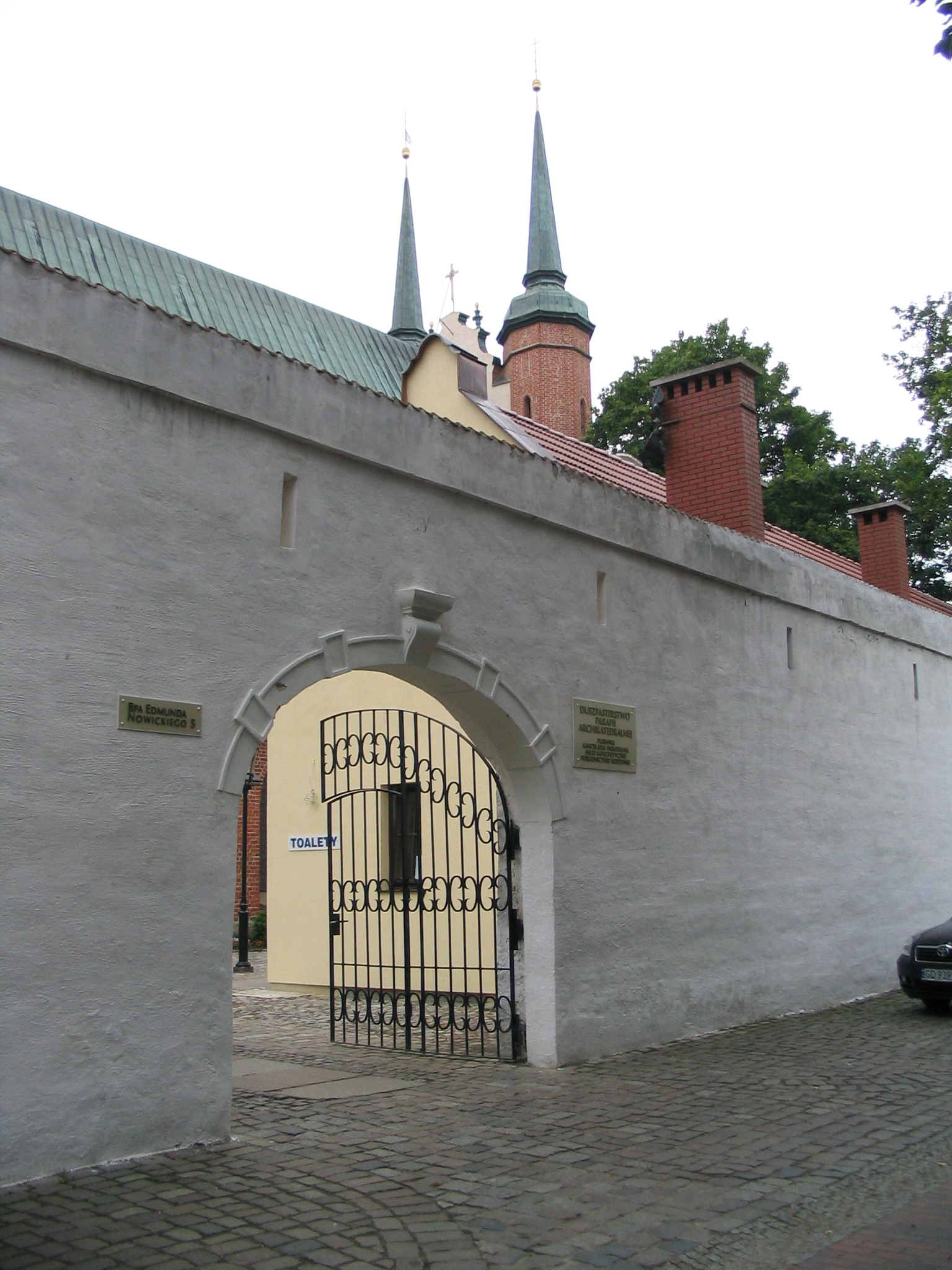
Side gate of the monastery

On 18 March 1188, the foundation act was ceremonially signed in Gdańsk. The monastery received valuable privileges enabling it to derive income from fishing and mills on the Oliwa Stream. It also received several villages, including the one that the monks named: Olyva, ubi coenobium constructum est (English: Oliwa, where the community is being built). Among linguists, there has long been a dispute over the origin of this name, with most agreeing that the etymology should be sought in the Slavic name of the river Oława, mistakenly associated by the monks who did not know the old Kashubian language with an olive, and consequently with the Mount of Olives.

The original monastery consisted of only twelve monks. Therefore, they limited themselves to building a Romanesque oratory (Note: Partially preserved to this day in the walls of the chancel.) and wooden residential buildings. Only in the first half of the 13th century was the oratory adapted into a chancel, elongated chapels were added on both sides, characteristic of the Cistercian church in Fontenay, on the plans of which many Cistercian temples were modeled. At that time, the transept and the main body of the church were built, with a length of four bays of the current nave, as well as the first brick monastery buildings. Around 1300, the Church of St. James was also built, intended – as a parish church – for the local population.

== Under the rule of the dukes of Pomerania and Poland ==
Around 1195, the monks from the Oliwa Abbey were removed, and new ones were sent from Kołbacz; presumably, it was due to disciplinary issues. However, the abbey flourished, and the generous donations of the dukes meant that by the end of the 13th century, the Oliwa Abbey owned 50 villages, a fishing station on the now practically nonexistent Zaspa Lake with a fleet of 40 boats, as well as exclusive rights to use the Strzyża stream and have mills on it, not to mention tithes from tariffs and Gdańsk taverns: decimam etiam de omnibus tabernis.

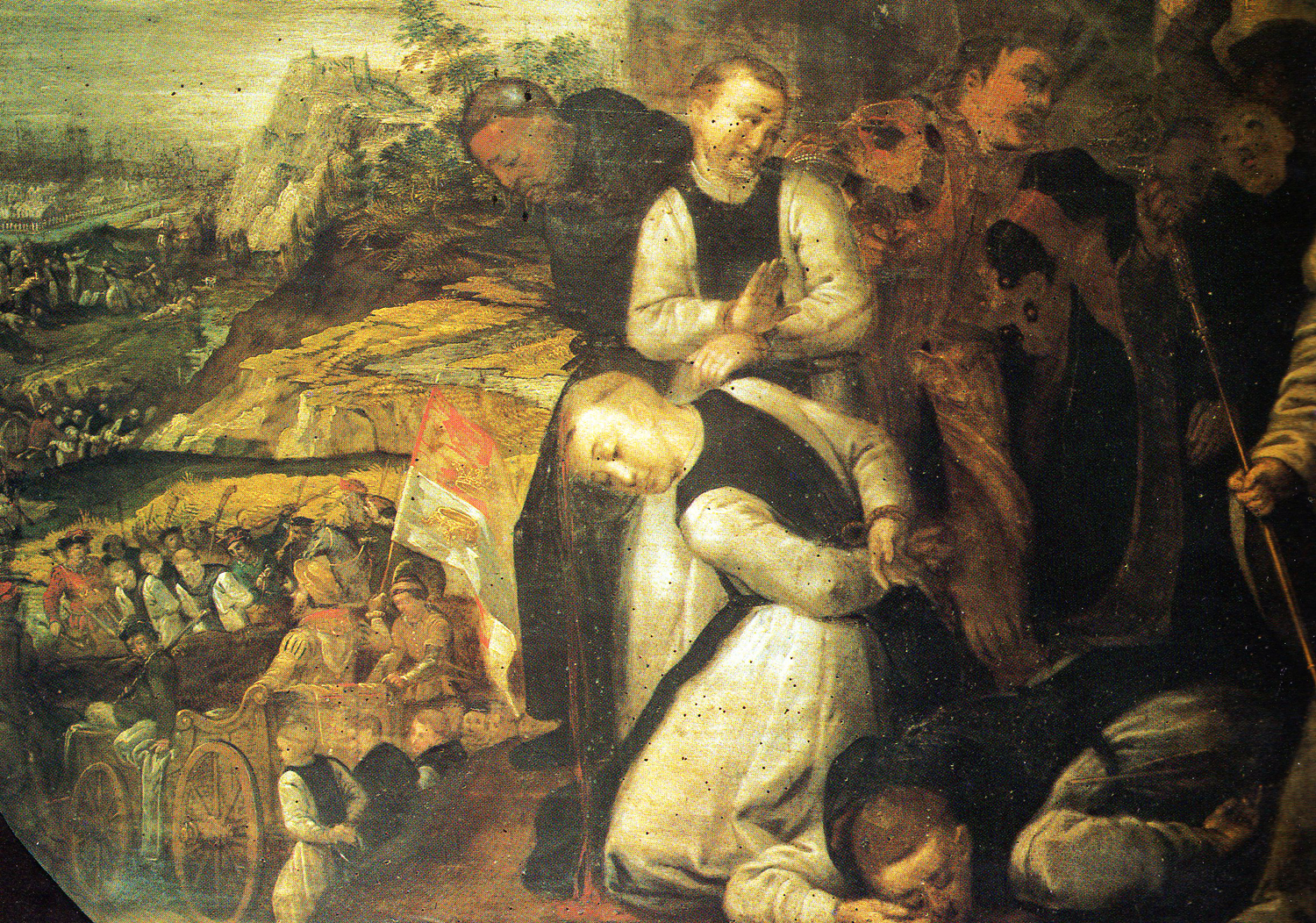
Slaughter of monks by Prussians near Gdańsk in 1226

In 1226, the monastery was plundered and burned by pagan Prussians, and the monks were massacred in front of the inhabitants. Soon after, new monks arrived from Kołbacz and began rebuilding, but in 1236, the Prussians returned, burning the buildings and killing six monks and thirty-four servants. The first of these attacks led Pope Honorius III to exempt the Cistercians of Oliwa from tithes. The abbey also experienced several raids by the Teutonic Knights; in 1246, the knights burnt down the monastery, and in 1247 and 1252, they plundered it. These were retaliatory strikes on the lands of Świętopełk II, whom the Teutonic Knights suspected of inciting the Prussians to revolt.

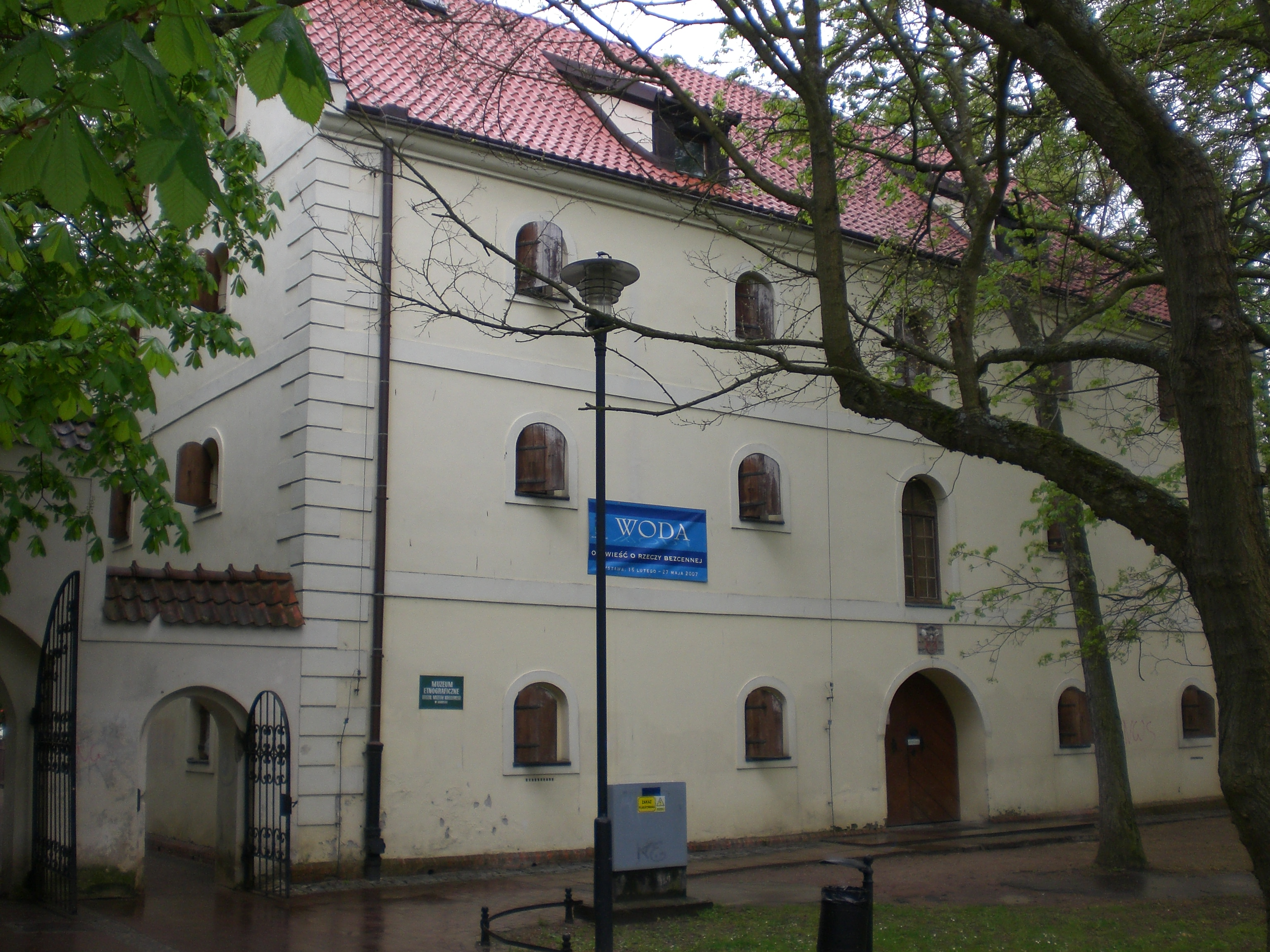
Former monastery granary – now home to the Ethnographic Museum

In 1294, another guardian of the abbey, Duke Mestwin II, died. In 1274, he had prohibited outsiders from logging in the forests belonging to the Oliwa Abbey. He was buried in the monastery church, like other Pomeranian rulers.

For Mestwin's funeral, Przemysł II – the Duke of Greater Poland, who, under an earlier agreement, inherited power in Pomerania – came to Oliwa. The unification of both regions opened the way for his coronation. However, he did not reign for long; he was murdered in 1296. For the next dozen or so years, Pomerania changed hands. First, its ruler was Duke Władysław I Łokietek, but in 1300, Wenceslaus II, ruling in Bohemia, became the king of Poland. In 1305, he was succeeded by Wenceslaus III, but before he could settle on the throne, he was assassinated in 1306. At that time, Pomerania was again taken over by Władysław Łokietek, who was gathering Polish lands, but soon he lost it. In 1308, nearby Gdańsk was occupied by the Brandenburgers, who inflicted significant damage on the abbey, which in 1310 was compensated by Margrave Waldemar, later mentioned among the benefactors of the abbey.

== During the Teutonic era ==
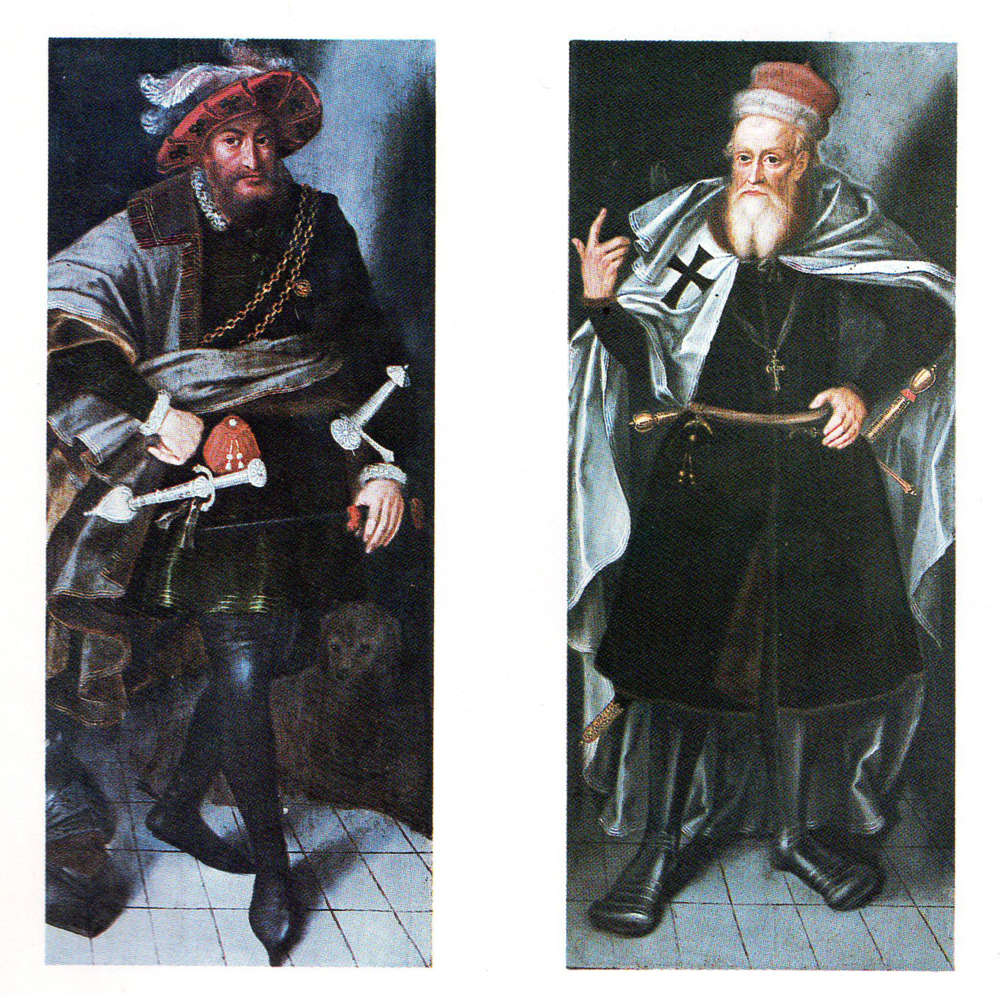
Margrave of Brandenburg Waldemar and Grand Master Winrich von Kniprode as founders and benefactors of Oliwa

After the Gdańsk massacre in 1308, Oliwa, along with the entire Pomerania, came under the Teutonic Order's rule. Abbot Rüdiger had to acknowledge the status quo. Despite this, and the confirmation in 1312 of the monastery's possessions by the Grand Master Karl von Trier, there were initially numerous disputes over property and territory between the Cistercian monastery and the Order. Therefore, at the request of the abbot of Oliwa, Pope John XXII confirmed the monastery's possessions in 1320. The bishops of Warmia and Pomesania also confirmed the monastery's property undividedness in 1323.

The abbots of Oliwa recognized the Teutonic Knights' authority. They even took their side during disputes with Poland before the pope. This did not prevent them, in 1325, despite the explicit prohibition of the Teutonic Knights, from paying Peter's Pence to the Polish bishops. Eventually, Oliwa's disputes with the Teutonic Order ceased in 1342, when Grand Master Ludolf König von Wattzau recognized all the Cistercians' claims.

On 25 March 1350, fire completely consumed the church and monastery; the fire likely broke out during the cleaning of the kitchen chimney. The church was rebuilt within five years, adopting a Gothic style. The chancel was extended eastward, and an ambulatory and an abbey chapel of the Holy Cross were built in place of the abolished chapels. The main nave was extended by four bays, giving the temple its current dimensions. During this time, a large refectory and a lavabo were also built in the monastery. Money for the reconstruction came, among other sources, from the treasury of Grand Master Heinrich Dusemer.

At the beginning of the 15th century, there was a clear relaxation of discipline, partly due to the monastery's financial situation. The Teutonic Knights imposed high taxes on the monastery's estates from 1401 to 1403 due to the escalating conflict with King Władysław II Jagiełło. This was compounded by epidemics in 1416 and 1427, followed by an invasion of Hussite Taborites allied with Poland. In 1433, during the Hussite expedition to the Baltic, Hussites led by Jan Čapek of Sány caused serious damage to the abbey and its estates, including burning down Sopot, but they did not capture Gdańsk, where the monks from Oliwa took refuge.

In 1454, the Thirteen Years' War broke out. King Casimir IV Jagiellon, at the request of the anti-Teutonic Prussian Confederation, declared the re-incorporation of Gdańsk Pomerania. Visiting the cities of Pomerania, he visited Oliwa in 1457. The abbey supported the Prussian Confederation, providing financial support and siding with the king. The Teutonic Knights tried to regain the lost territories, so the royal troops defending Gdańsk occupied the Oliwa Abbey. 600 soldiers under Gotard of Radlin surrounded Oliwa with a ring of fortifications.

Ultimately, after 1466, as a result of the Second Peace of Thorn, Gdańsk Pomerania returned to Poland as part of the province of Royal Prussia, later part of the larger Greater Poland Province.

== During the Reformation era ==
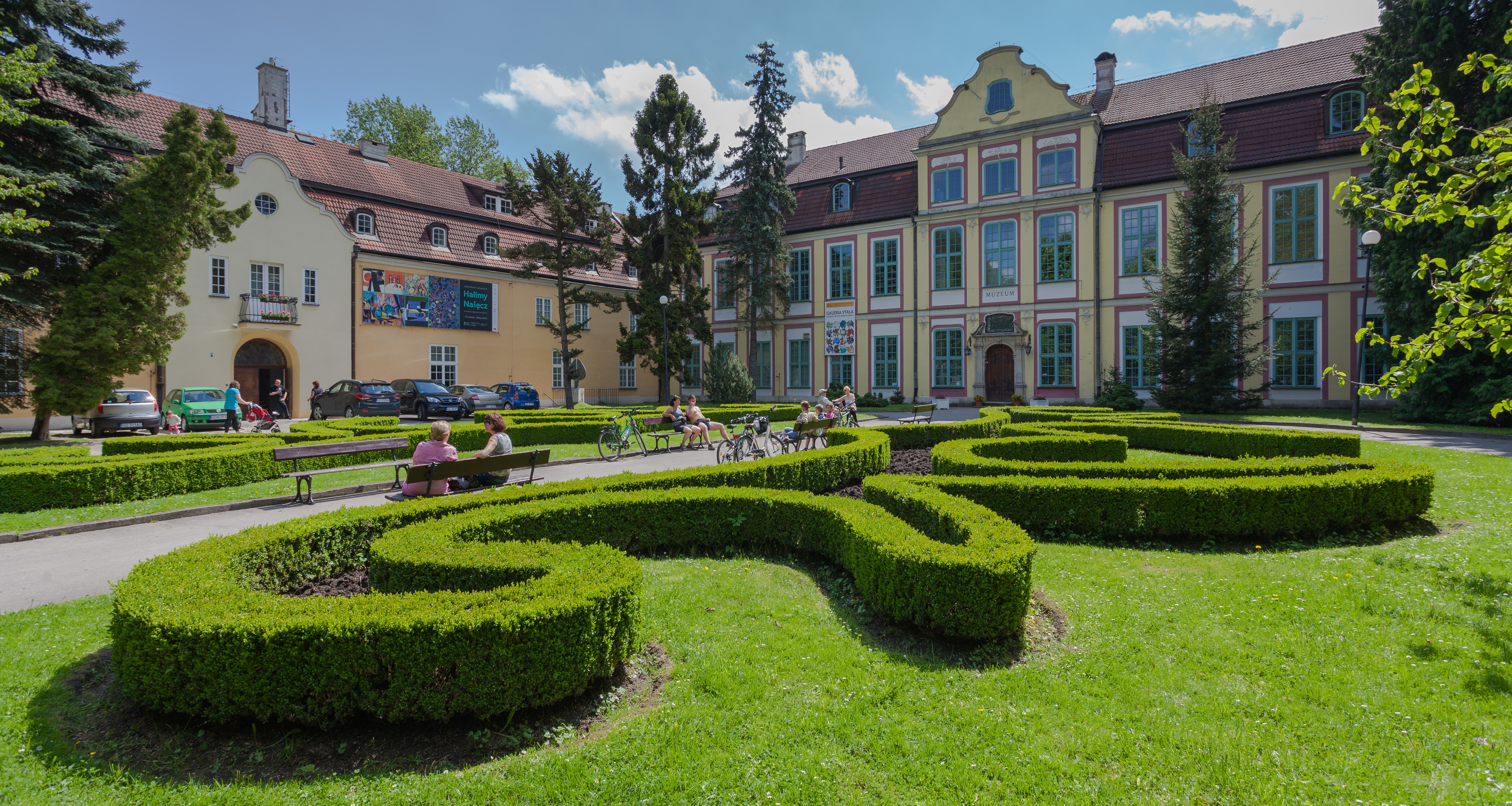
On the left, The Old Palace from the 15th century

In the second half of the 15th century, attempts were made to annex the monasteries in Oliwa and Pelplin to the Polish provincial convents, but in 1487, the general chapter of the Cistercian Order in Cîteaux, Burgundy, issued a decree stating that both convents belonged to the Baltic province. Oliwa was visited by abbots from Kołbacz, which probably contributed to the removal of Abbot Piotr Smitzingius.

From 1474 to 1488, Abbot Mikołaj Muskendorf carried out renovation and construction work in the abbey and its estates. In 1516, the Oliwa Abbey provided hospitality to Albert of Prussia, which was viewed as hostile to the Crown, as during the war of 1519–1521, mercenary units from Brandenburg passed through Oliwa. The monks explained that Albert was the Grand Master of the Order, and the abbey provided him with lodging as a dignitary of the Church.

The 16th century saw increasing influences of the Reformation in Gdańsk and Pomerania. After 1525, the Pomeranian nobility, leaning towards the Reformation, began demanding that the Cistercians join the mendicant orders and leave the monastery, living on alms. King Sigismund I the Old intervened on behalf of the Oliwa Cistercians, entrusting the protection of the abbey to Voivode Jerzy Bażyński. In 1540, the Gdańsk City Council decreed that the Oliwa monastery should support education, but the abbots cited low income as a reason not to comply. In the same year, an attempt was made to transfer the estates of the Oliwa and Pelplin monasteries to the diocesan bishop, but the Pelplin abbot personally sought confirmation of his possessions from King Sigismund II Augustus. In the entire Pomeranian province, only Oliwa and Pelplin remained, as other abbeys ceased to exist.

The influences of the Reformation were also felt in Oliwa. In 1549, Lambert Schlieff, favoring Protestantism, was appointed abbot. The choice was made under pressure from the Loitz family, which had significant influence on the king. Schlieff was supported by the Bishop of Warmia. In 1555, King Sigismund Augustus granted Schlieff indygenat. The Oliwa Chronicle called Schlieff uneducated, disobedient, and wasteful of the abbey's wealth, which led to his removal from office in 1557. This was initiated by Kasper Geschkau, who accused Schlieff of various crimes. Initially, the king stopped supporting Schlieff, but under the influence of his powerful backers, he reinstated him as abbot. In 1559, on his way to the abbey, Schlieff died, but he managed to appoint his successor, Mikołaj Locka.

Mikołaj Locka obtained confirmation of his position from the king, but in Oliwa, Kasper Geschkau held office. He was removed (by royal order) only through the use of force. Mikołaj Locka assumed the office of abbot, but Geschkau sought support with all his might. In 1567, he regained royal favor, and in 1568, he reached an agreement with Mikołaj Locka, whereby he became the bishop coadjutor of the Oliwa abbey, a position that ensured succession after the death of the incumbent abbot. In 1569, Geschkau obtained the nomination and took office in Oliwa. Soon, Geschkau, along with Bishop Stanisław Karnkowski of Kuyavia and Castellan Jan Kostka of Gdańsk, stood at the head of the royal Maritime Commission and acted several times as the king's spokesmen in disputes with Gdańsk (over the church occupied by Protestants, over the Livonian War, over the fleet of privateers and over repayment of loans).

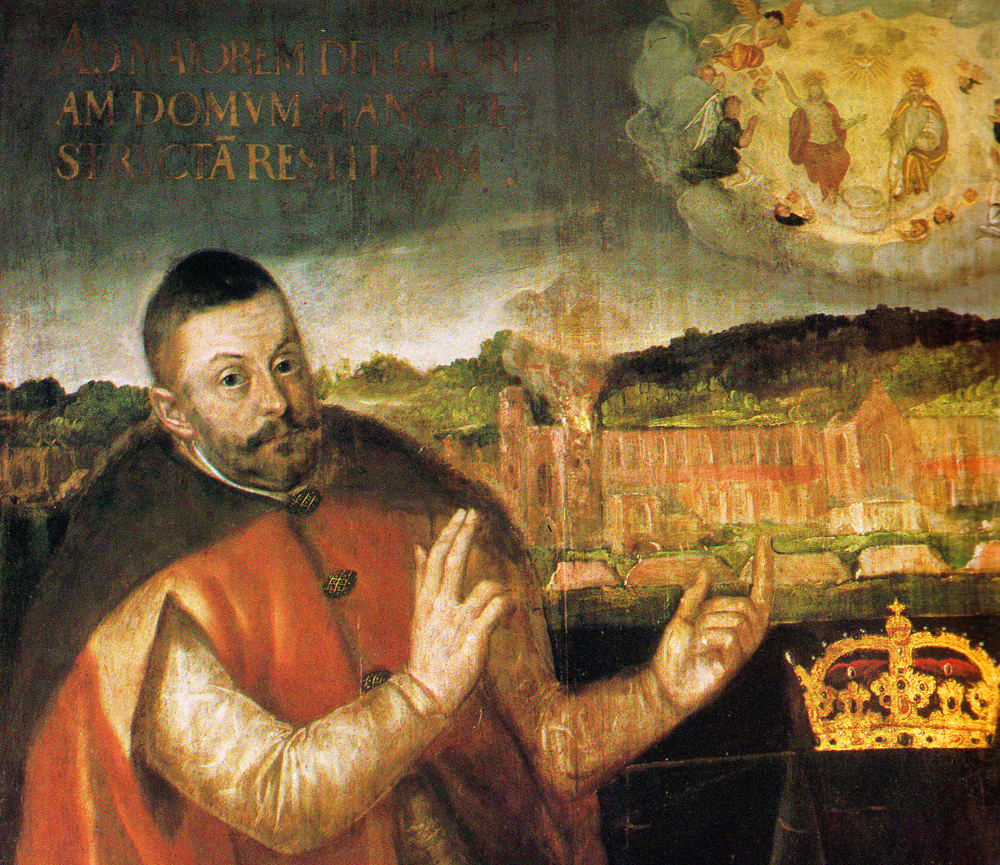
King Stephen Báthory and the Oliwa Abbey burned by the Gdańsk citizens

When Gdańsk rebelled against King Stephen Báthory's rule, Abbot Geschkau was already known as a supporter of the Commonwealth and had repeatedly angered the city. In February 1577, an attack by Protestant Gdańsk citizens occurred. Geschkau managed to escape, but the abbey was looted and completely burned down. Two monks were killed, and several were wounded. The surviving walls of the monastery were to be demolished by the Gdańsk citizens, but relief arrived in the form of royal troops led by starosta Ernest Weiher. A year later, Gdańsk finally recognized Báthory's authority and was forced to pay 20,000 guilders in compensation. Thanks to this, as well as the generous donations of the king and magnates, the reconstruction of the monastery could begin immediately. All monastery buildings and the church were rebuilt in their former shape and style. Only a baptismal chapel was added, along with Baroque decorations. The church began functioning again in 1583. Until then, the Cistercians had lived in the Carthusian monastery taken over by Geschkau. Kasper Geschkau died in 1584. Just before his death, the reconstruction of the old abbey palace, which, according to the Annales Monasterii Olivensis, had once been the duke's residence, was completed: ubi consuerunt habitare fundatores huius monasterii (English: where the founders of this abbey used to live).

== During the reign of the House of Vasa ==
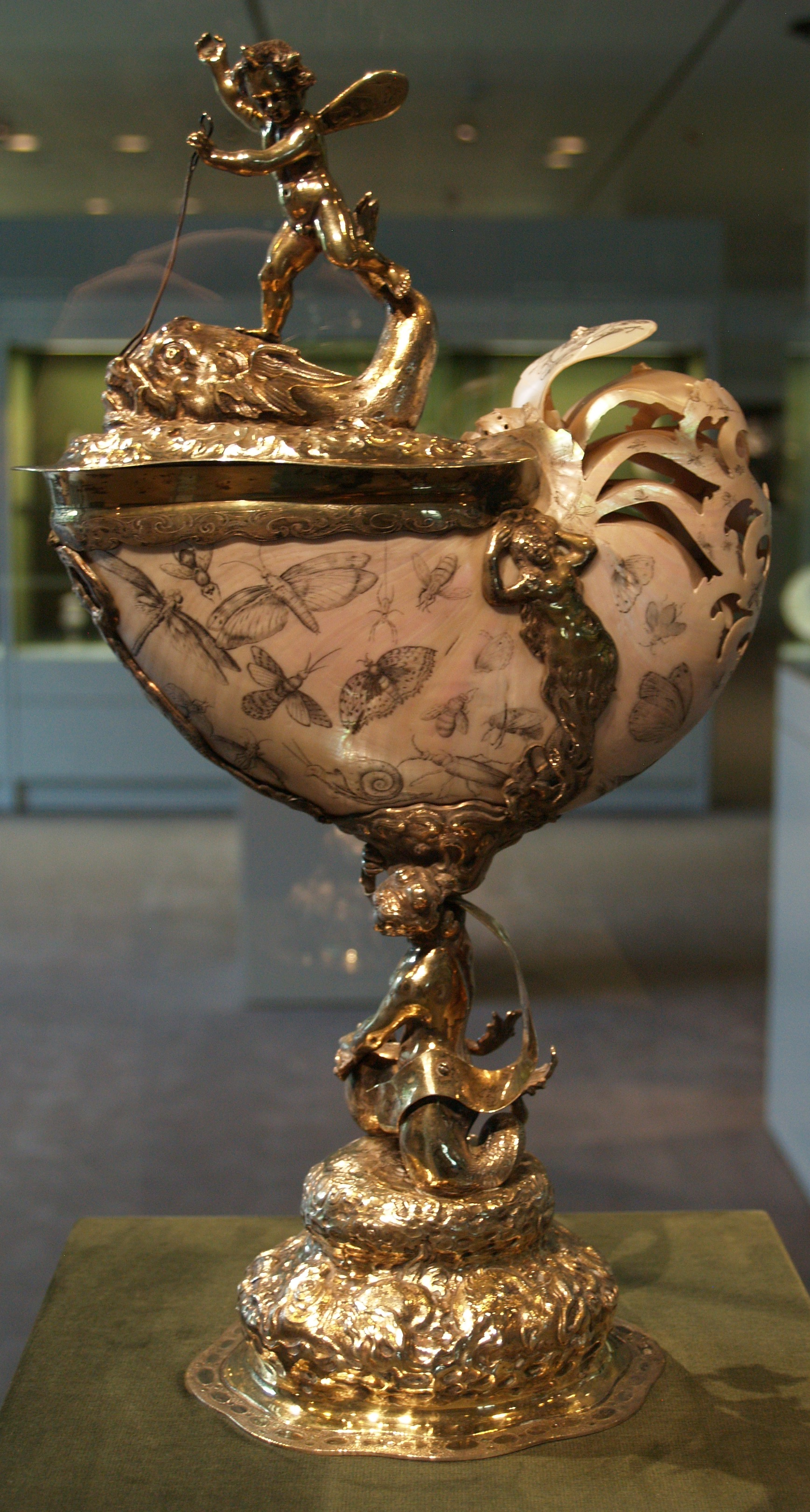
Nautilus cup with the coat of arms of Abbot Aleksander Kęsowski by Andreas I Mackensen, 1643–1667, Kunstgewerbemuseum Berlin

Jan Kostka, became the next abbot, holding this dignity from 1584 until his death in 1588. In 1587 – while he was still alive – King Sigismund III Vasa visited Oliwa and swore the pacta conventa. That year it was also agreed that the election of Oliwa abbots would be at the discretion of the bishops of Włocławek. In 1588, Dawid Konarski became abbot. During his reign, the landed estates and properties seized ten years earlier by Kasper Geschkau were returned to the Carthusian Order.

In 1594, the renovation of the church was completed. In the same year, King Sigismund, accompanied by his wife Anna, visited Oliwa. The Catholic monarch had a fondness for Oliwa – in the summer of 1598, he spent over a month in the monastery, and in the autumn, he visited Oliwa again. In 1603, he obtained from Pope Clement VIII the right for the Oliwa abbots to wear the mitre and carry the crozier. In 1623, when King Sigismund was in Gdańsk, his second wife, Constance of Austria, visited Oliwa. In 1596, the priorate was expanded. In 1603, the first pipe organ was built, followed by a pulpit in 1605. In 1604, the reconstructed Church of St. James was consecrated. In 1605 and 1608, the monastery walls were rebuilt, reflecting the real threat from the Swedes. The threat must have been significant, as it prompted the Cistercians to deposit their archives and treasury in Gdańsk. In 1616, Dawid Konarski died, and Adam Trebnic succeeded him as abbot.

In 1626, the monastery was plundered by Swedish forces under the command of Admiral Carl Gyllenhielm. It was during this time that the Renaissance pulpit and pipe organs were taken to the Swedish Skokloster Castle. The Oliwa convent survived the war with the Swedes in Gdańsk, returning to Oliwa in 1628. Earlier, in 1627, a battle took place between the Polish and Swedish fleets in the Gdańsk Bay. The war ended in 1629, and in 1630, Abbot Adam Trebnic died. Considering that the monastery had lost a significant part of its furnishings, successive abbots (Jan Grabiński, Aleksander Grabiński, Michał Konarski, and Aleksander Kęsowski) funded a new, this time Baroque, interior for the church.

In 1635, King Władysław IV, papal nuncio Honoriusz Visconti, and French envoy d'Avaux visited Oliwa. In 1646, the official welcome of the royal fiancée – Duchess Marie Louise Gonzaga of Mantua – took place in Oliwa. The duchess was greeted by a procession of diplomats and state dignitaries on behalf of King Władysław and the Commonwealth. Five years later, Marie Louise, now alongside her second husband, King John II Casimir, visited Oliwa once again.

The years from 1655 to 1660 marked another war with the Swedes, known in Poland as the "Swedish Deluge". Many monks left Oliwa during this time. The treasury and library of the monastery were moved to Gdańsk, which the Swedes failed to capture. However, the Oliwa Abbey was plundered by Swedish soldiers under Gustaf Otto Stenbock in 1656. The monks sought help from the garrison of Gdańsk, who indeed drove out the Swedes from the abbey but then themselves began to loot and demolish the monastery. The war with the Swedes concluded with negotiations in Oliwa; held in the abbey, they resulted in the signing of the peace treaty on 3 May 1660. During the negotiations, the royal court resided in Gdańsk, the Swedes were stationed in Sopot, and the French mediators resided in the monastery.

== Times of "peace" ==
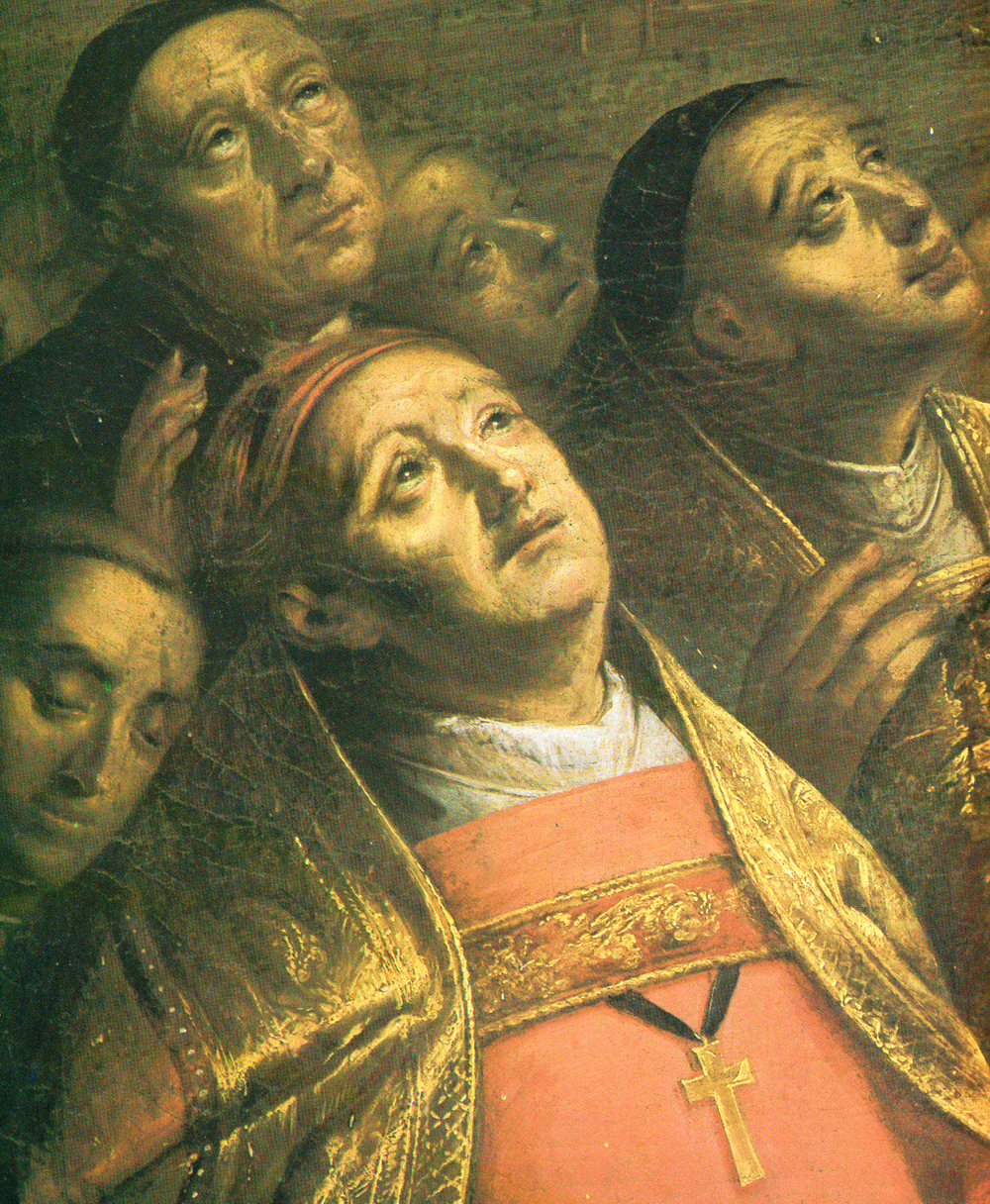
Abbot Michał Hacki in the painting in the main altar of the monastery church

In 1665, a new building for the monastery hospital was erected, and in 1676, a printing press was established. In 1677 and 1678, King John III Sobieski visited the abbey, residing there for several months while resolving disputes between the council and the guilds. When Karol Łoknicki died in 1683, King Sobieski appointed Michał Antoni Hacki as the abbot of Oliwa. Hacki, who had previously served as prior since 1660, also ventured into diplomacy and clandestine services. John Sobieski appointed him as his secretary and utilized him for diplomatic missions. Hacki was an agent of the royal counterintelligence, successfully deciphering diplomatic letters from foreign powers. Upon moving to Oliwa, Hacki contributed to the development of the monastery. He funded much of the Baroque furnishings for the church, particularly the main altar completed in 1688. In 1697, when François Louis, a French candidate for the Polish crown, arrived in Oliwa, Abbot Hacki sided with his Saxon competitor, Augustus II the Strong, enabling the Polish-Saxon forces to disperse the French. In the spring of 1698, King Augustus II, hosted by Abbot Hacki, visited Oliwa to inspect the site of the battle.

During the reign of Abbot Hacki, the monumental Baroque main altar, which occupies the entire wall space and the vault of the eastern closure of the chancel, was erected in 1688. The altar is probably the work of the Gdańsk architect and sculptor Andreas Schlüter, and the painting depicting Hacki and the monks praying to the Holy Trinity, the Virgin Mary, and St. Bernard was created in the workshop of Andrzej Stech. The old monastery treasury was also rebuilt to house the pharmacy, the abbey court, the priests' and church servants' apartments, and a printing press operating from 1673 to 1744.

In 1702, during the Great Northern War, Saxon troops wintered in Oliwa, which suffered from contributions and requisitions. Kazimierz Dąbrowski succeeded the deceased Abbot Hacki in 1703. During his tenure, the tower of the Church of St. James was rebuilt in 1709 – the year of a major plague that claimed the lives of hundreds of Oliwa residents. This was one of many epidemics in Pomerania, but the Oliwa monastery felt its effects particularly strongly. Nine Cistercian pastoral ministers died consecutively in the Gate House (known since then as the "House of Pestilence"). In the following year, the General Assembly of Prussia met in Oliwa, attended by King Augustus II. The king also visited Oliwa in 1716. In 1722, Abbot Kazimierz Dąbrowski died, and Franciszek Mikołaj Zaleski succeeded him. In the same year, the Oliwa Shooting Brotherhood was established, responsible for assisting in the Corpus Christi processions.

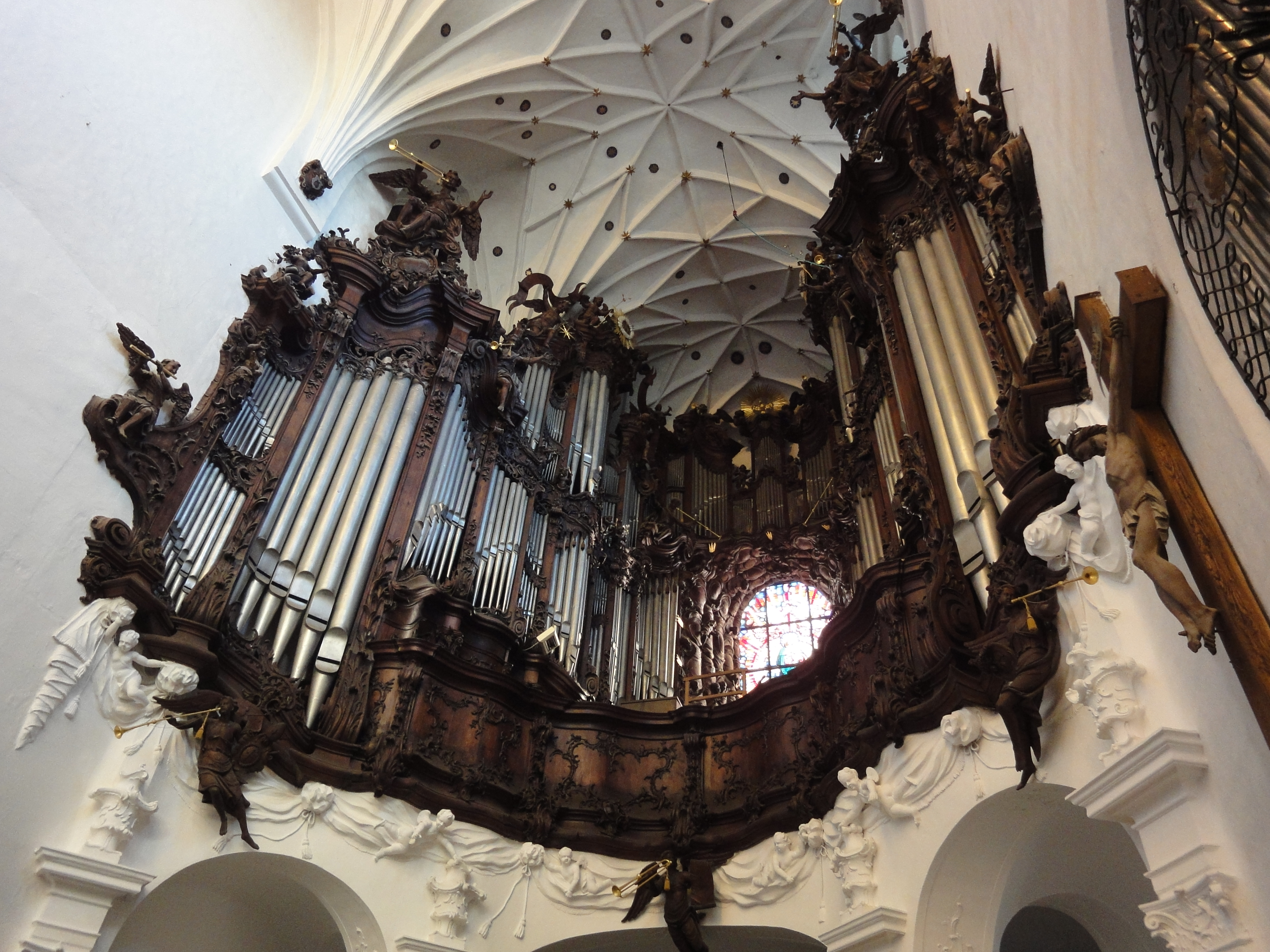
Large pipe organs from the 18th century

In 1733, after the death of King Augustus II, the War of the Polish Succession broke out, with fighting for the throne between Augustus III and Stanisław Leszczyński. Gdańsk sided with Leszczyński, while Oliwa remained with the Wettins. Although the abbot occasionally visited Leszczyński, who resided in Gdańsk, he also sought the protection of the Russian commanders supporting Augustus. During the siege of Gdańsk in 1734, the abbey palace housed the Russian Field Marshal Burkhard Christoph von Münnich, sparing Oliwa from destruction, although other monastery properties suffered from the military actions. After the conclusion of the 145-day siege of Gdańsk, King Augustus III stayed in Oliwa, where he received the homage of the Gdańsk citizens and then held a reception in the monastery gardens in honor of his supporters, especially his patron – Empress Anna of Russia.

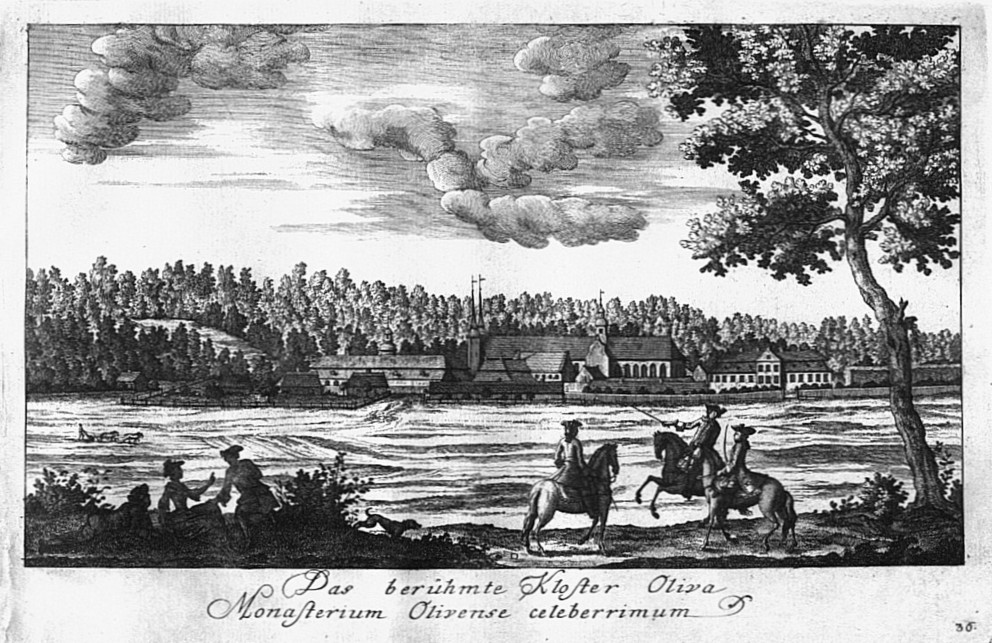
Cistercian monastery in Oliwa (1765)

In 1736, King August III agreed to abide by the principle of free choice of the abbot of Oliwa. However, this was to apply only to one candidate, Jacek Rybiński, as during his lifetime, the First Partition of Poland took place, and the Prussian occupier had no intention of respecting agreements made by Polish rulers. As a token of gratitude for the preservation of the abbey, the cult of St. Oliwa was established, initiated by Hacki. In 1738, the abbot, along with prior Iwo Roweder (the abbot was one of the authors of the Oliwa Chronicle), traveled to the Cistercian authorities in Cîteaux to seek approval for the new cult on Pomeranian land. The Oliwa Shooting Brotherhood was reactivated for this purpose, to enhance the festivities associated with the introduction of the cult of St. Oliwa. The ceremonies took place from 5 to 6 June 1739, and the highlight was the transfer of the saint's relics from the Church of St. James to the monastery church. In 1739, thanks to Abbot Iwo Roweder, a philosophical-theological academy was established, which operated until 1783.

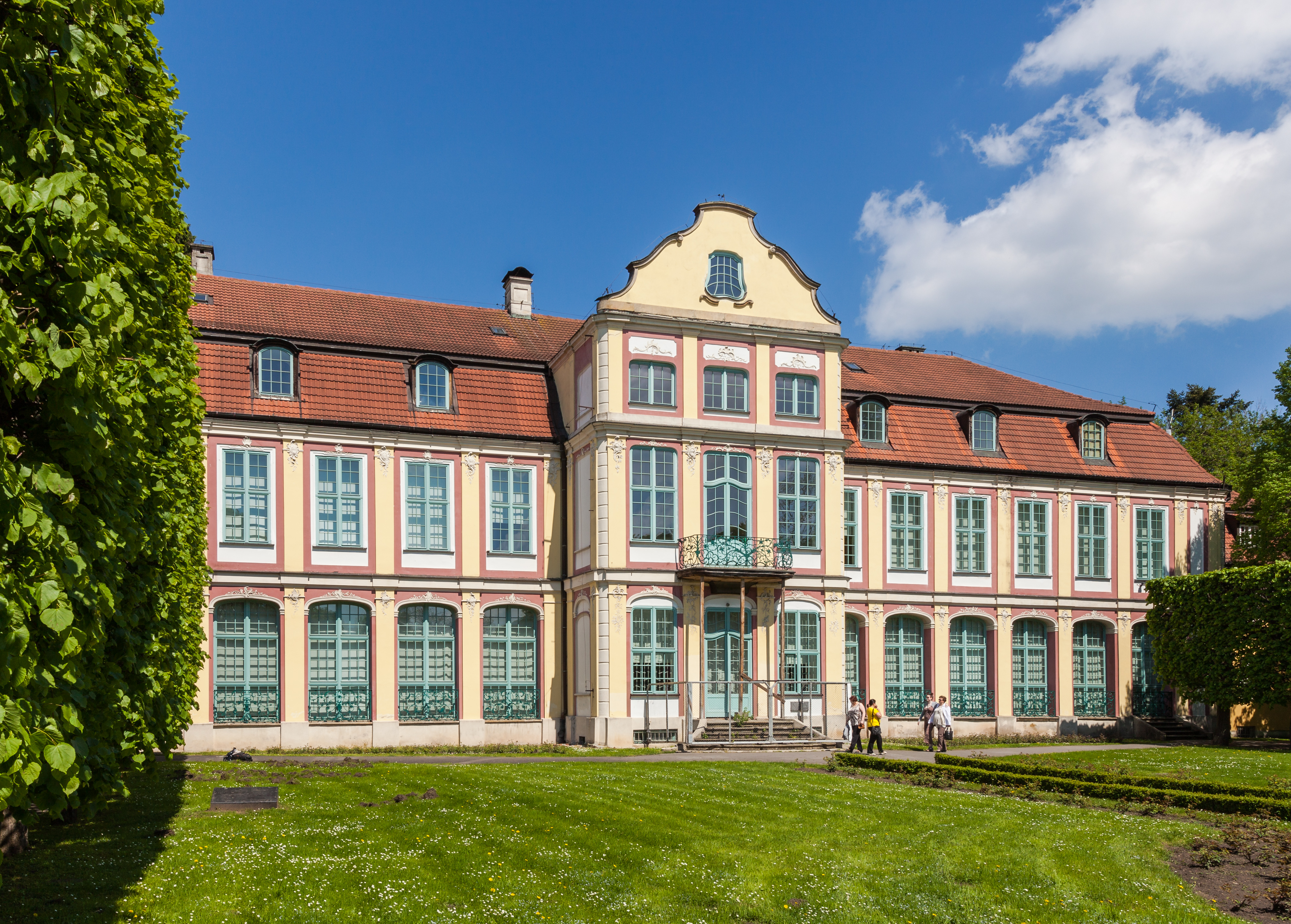
New abbot palace from the time of Father Jacek Rybiński

At the initiative of Abbot Rybiński, the Church of St. James was renovated in 1736 (a new dome was added), as well as the no longer existing St. Lazarus Hospice. From 1754 to 1756, a new rococo abbey palace and a new pulpit were built. Rybiński's most significant undertaking was the commissioning of new pipe organs. Initially, the abbot ordered small organs from Father Johann Wulff (in the transept of the church), then sent him at his own expense to study under the best European masters. Upon his return, Rybiński commissioned him to build the large organs in the main nave.

== From Partitions to closure ==
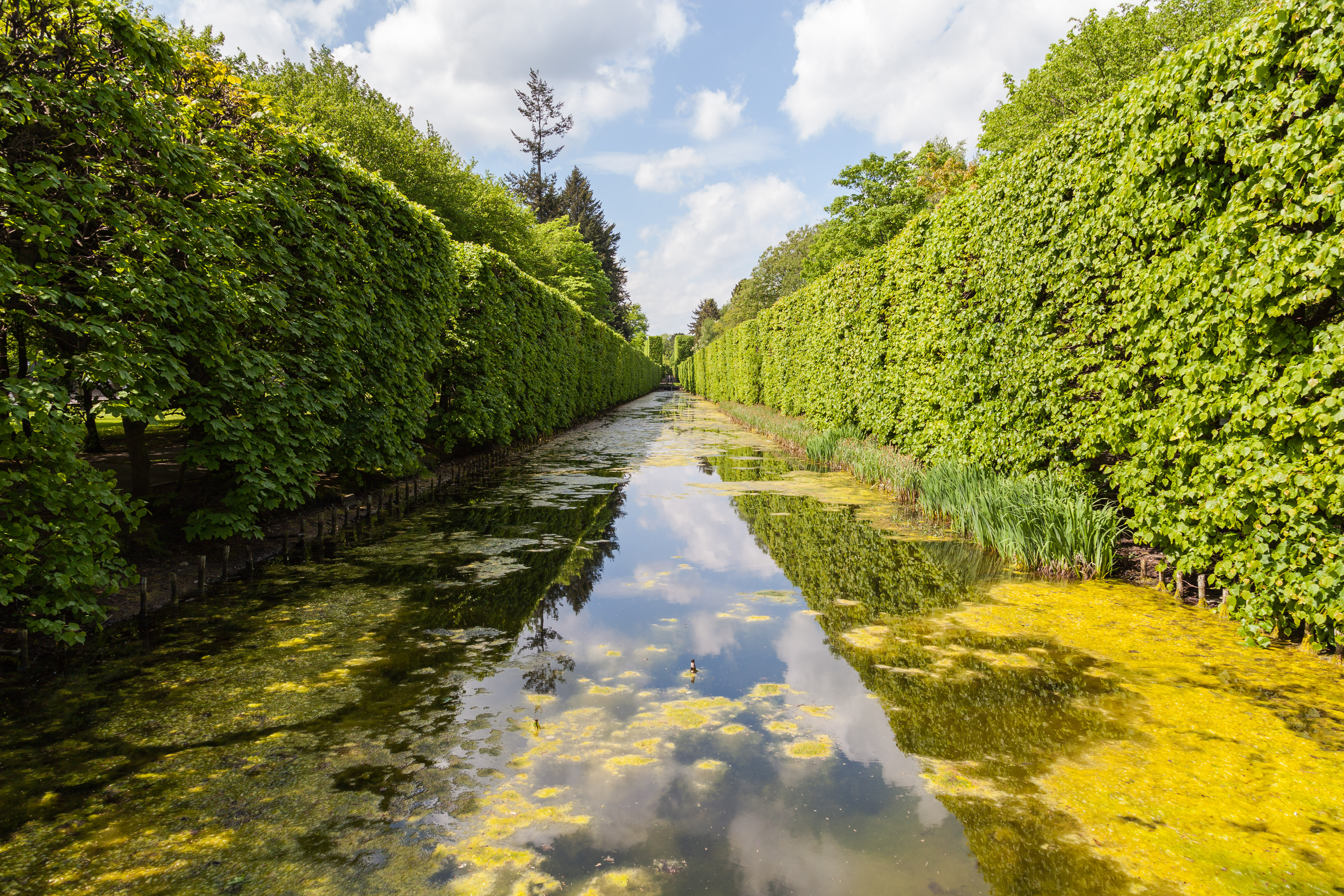
Former park of the abbey

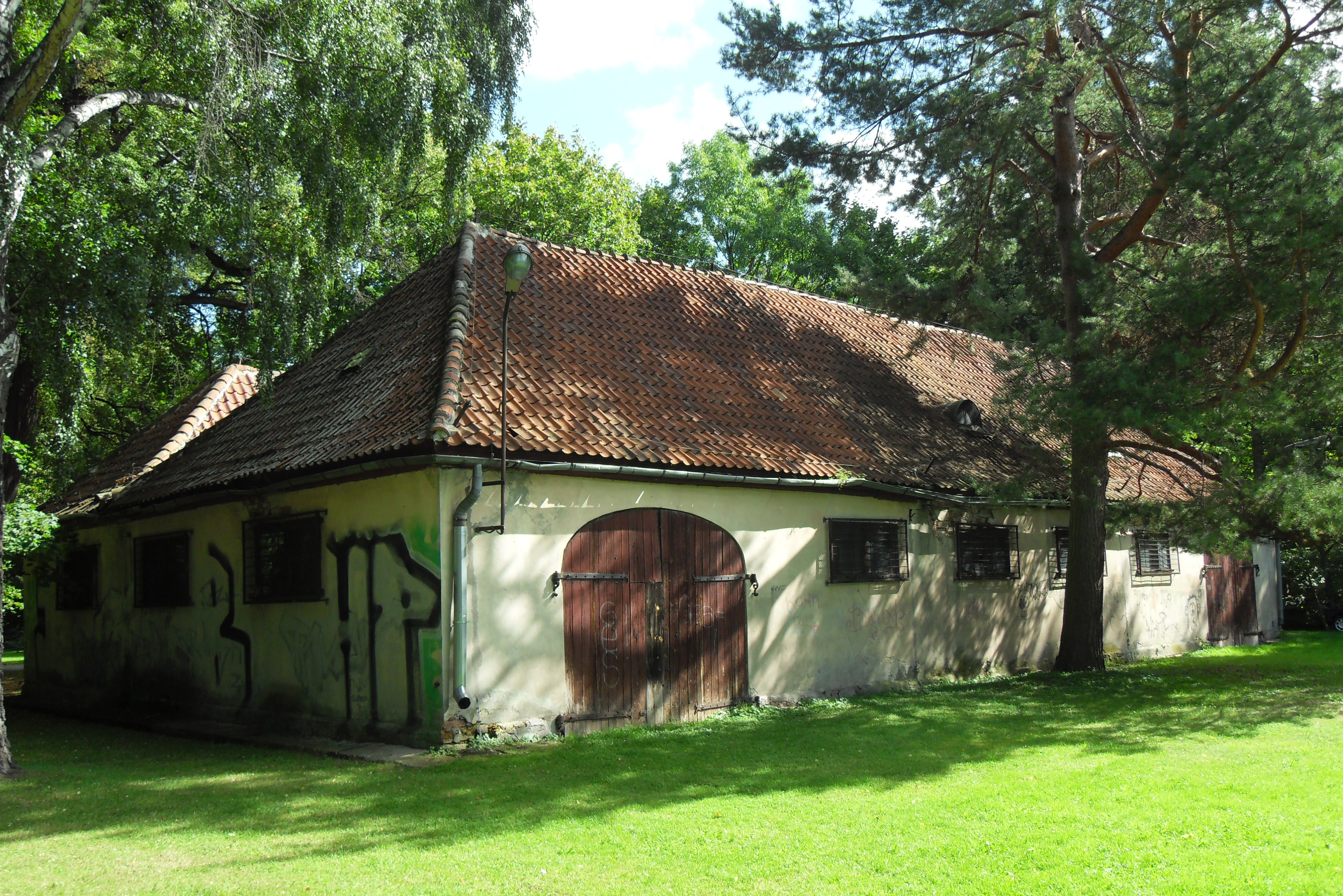
Historic stable

The splendor of the abbey came to an end in 1772, with the First Partition of Poland, when Oliwa fell under Prussian rule. The Prussian state seized all the monastery's assets except for those within the territory of Gdańsk (which defended its independence for some time). The abbot was granted an annual pension of 4000 guilders, and the monastery received a monetary compensation. In 1782, Abbot Jacek Rybiński died. Bishop Ignacy Krasicki, a frequent guest at the abbey, sought his position, but the Prussian king appointed his cousin, Duke Karol von Hohenzollern, as the commendatory abbot, who also became the abbot of Pelplin (he became in 1785 Bishop of Chelmno and in 1795 Prince-Bishop of Warmia).

The suddenly impoverished convent had to start selling off some of the artworks from the church furnishings. Thus, a Baroque pulpit, 8 relief biblical scenes, and 7 scenes of the Passion (probably all from the workshop of Andreas Götcken) were transferred to the parish church in Brzóza, purchased in Oliwa by General Stanisław Ożarowski.

In 1793, Karol Hohenzollern leased the nearby Pachołek Hill (German: Karlsberg – named after the abbot) and built a scenic belvedere, later replaced by a stone observation tower. In 1798, King Frederick William II and his wife Louise of Mecklenburg-Strelitz visited the place. Karol honored his guests by naming one of the hills "Louise's Mountain". After Karol's death in 1803, his successor was Duke Józef von Hohenzollern, later Prince-Bishop of Warmia.

In 1807, the pipe organs builder, Father Michał Wulff, died. That same year, Gdańsk was captured by Napoleonic and Polish forces. A French lazaretto was set up in Oliwa. When the first Free City of Danzig was established, including Oliwa, the monastery ceased to receive subsidies from the Prussian state and was forced to sell silver items from the church and monastery. In 1813, there was a Russian siege of Gdańsk. After the fall of Gdańsk, Oliwa was definitively annexed to the Prussian state. In 1820, authorities issued a ban on admitting novices, in 1821, it ceased to be a Territorial Abbey with the papal bull De salute animarum, and in 1829, an order for the monastery's liquidation was issued. It took place on 1 October 1831. The monastery and abbatial properties were divided between the city of Gdańsk and the Prussian king. The last abbot, Józef Hohenzollern-Hechingen, died in 1836. Parishes were established in place of the abbey: a Catholic one (of the Diocese of Chelmno) headquartered in the former monastery church and an Evangelical one in the Church of St. James.

Over the centuries, most of the monastery's industrial facilities were destroyed. There were over twenty mills along the Oliwa Stream and its tributaries, powered by water. They were numbered against the current of the stream – from Mill I in Jelitkowo to Mill XXIV in the Krzaczasty Mill Valley. The largest among them was the Water Forge, which still exists today. In the mid-18th century, the forge's tenant was required to pay the monastery 140 florins annually and supply about 485 kg of iron per year. Even in 1830, the facility produced almost 200 tons of various metal products.

The Cistercians returned to Oliwa in 1945, but they did not regain the abbey because since 1925 the former Abbey church is the Cathedral of the Diocese of Gdańsk. They took over the former Evangelical church on Leśna Street, now dedicated to Our Lady Queen of the Polish Crown, along with the building at 131 Polanki Street, converted into a convent. Their priory is under the Szczyrzyc Abbey. In 1988, a separate parish was established at the church.

== See also ==
- Oliwa
- Oliwa Cathedral
- History of Gdańsk

== Bibliography ==
- Cieślak, Edmund (1993). Historia Gdańska (in Polish). Vol. III. Gdańsk: Zakład historii Gdańska i dziejów morskich Polski. ISBN 83-215-3251-9.
- Grzybkowska, Teresa (2000). Gdańsk (in Polish). Wrocław: Wydawnictwo Dolnośląskie. ISBN 83-7023-770-3.
- Jasiński, Kazimierz (1978). "Gdańsk w okresie samodzielności politycznej Pomorza Gdańskiego". In Cieślak, Edmund (ed.). Historia Gdańska (in Polish). Vol. I. Gdańsk: Wydawnictwo Morskie. ISBN 83-215-3251-9.
- Mamuszka, Franciszek (1985). Oliwa: Okruchy z dziejów, zabytki (in Polish). Gdańsk: Krajowa Agencja Wydawnicza. ISBN 83-03-00938-9.
- Samsonowicz, Henryk (1982). "Gdańsk a poczynania morskie Zygmunta Augusta". In Cieślak, Edmund (ed.). Historia Gdańska (in Polish). Vol. II. Gdańsk: Wydawnictwo Morskie. ISBN 83-215-3244-6.
- Szypowski, Maria and Andrzej (1987). Oliwa: Muzyka wieków (in Polish). Warsaw: Interpress. ISBN 83-223-2441-3.
- Zbierski, Andrzej (1978). "Gdańsk w okresie panowania królów polskich i książąt pomorskich". In Cieślak, Edmund (ed.). Historia Gdańska (in Polish). Vol. I. Gdańsk: Wydawnictwo Morskie. ISBN 83-215-3251-9.
- Ornatek, Adam Stefan (2020). "Opactwo terytorialne cystersów w Oliwie koło Gdańska w świetle konstytucji apostolskiej De salute animarum z 16 lipca 1821 roku". Studia Redemptorystowskie (in Polish) (18): 355–384.
