= Jacek Rybiński =

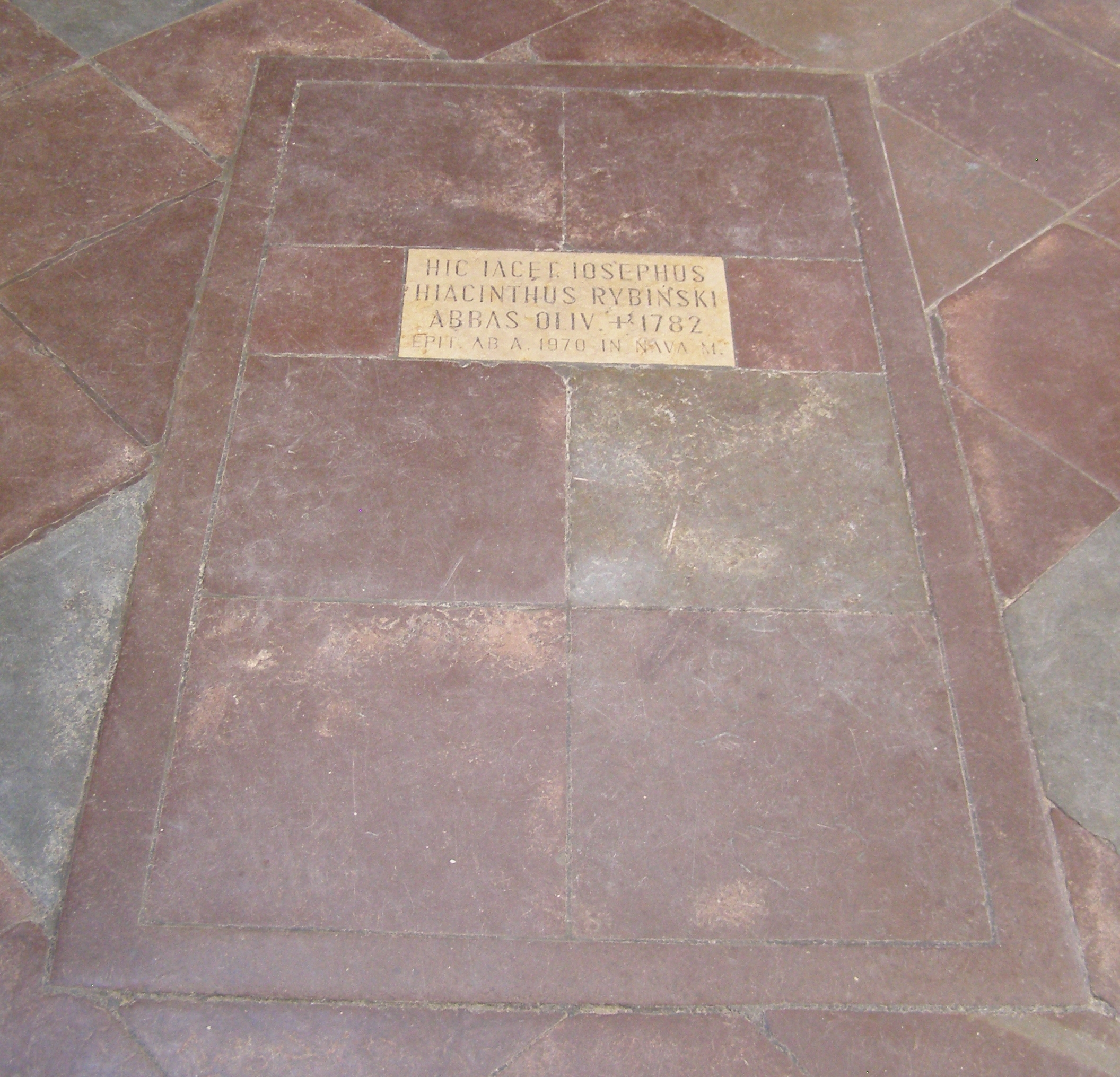
ledger stone of abbot Jacek Rybiński, Oliwa Cathedral, Gdańsk

Józef Jacek Rybiński (28 February 1701 in Torczyn - 15 April 1782 in Oliwa) was a Cistercian and the abbot of the Oliwa Monastery.

He attended the Jesuit seminary in Stare Szkoty near Gdańsk (Danzig). He held a position at the court of the King of Poland August II and was a secretary to the Under Chancellor of the Grand Duchy of Lithuania. In 1729 he took monastic vows. He studied theology and church law in Rome and Prague. In 1740 he became the abbot of the Oliwa monastery. He was a friend of the Polish general, poet and political figure Józef Wybicki and a supporter of the Bar Confederation, an association of Polish nobles organized to defend the internal and external independence of the Polish–Lithuanian Commonwealth against Russian influence. He backed August III for King of Poland and opposed the Czartoryski family.

Thanks to his monetary backing the Abbot's Palace in Oliwa was constructed, as well as the surrounding Oliwa Park, designed by Kazimierz Dębiński, in French Rococo style, which survives to this day. He also financed the renovation of the Church of St. Jacob in the city. Also thanks to his support the organ of the Oliwa Cathedral was constructed by Johann Wilhelm Wulff, beginning in 1758; at the time of its completion in 1788 it was the largest organ in Europe. Rybiński was so impressed with Wulff's initial work that he paid for his further studies abroad, in Germany and Holland, on the condition that upon his return Wulff finish the organs and join the Cistercian order. As a result of these activities, even during his life he was referred to as "The Great Abbot of the (Polish) Republic" (Wielki Opat Rzeczypospolitej).

After the First Partition of Poland, the Prussian occupation authorities disbanded the Oliwa Monastery and seized the properties of the order, paying compensation equal to only a small fraction of actual value. As a result, the construction of the Oliwa Cathedral organs ran into financial difficulties despite Rybiński's efforts, and eventually plans to gild the organs had to be abandoned.

Rybiński died in 1782 in Oliwa.
