= Torchyn =

Rural locality in Volyn Oblast, Ukraine

Torchyn Торчин
- Rural settlement
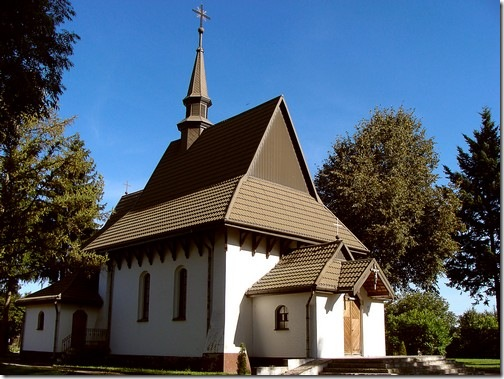

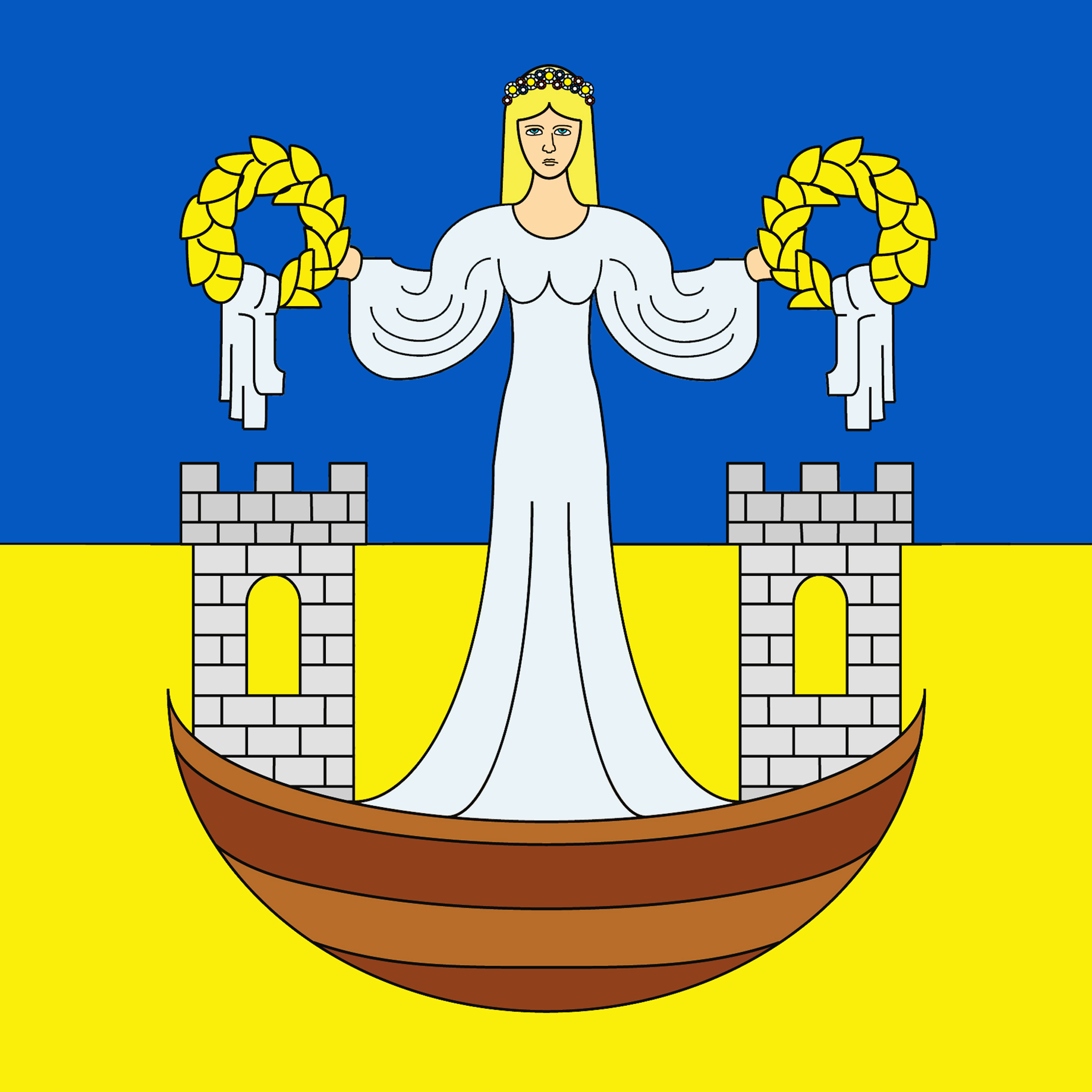
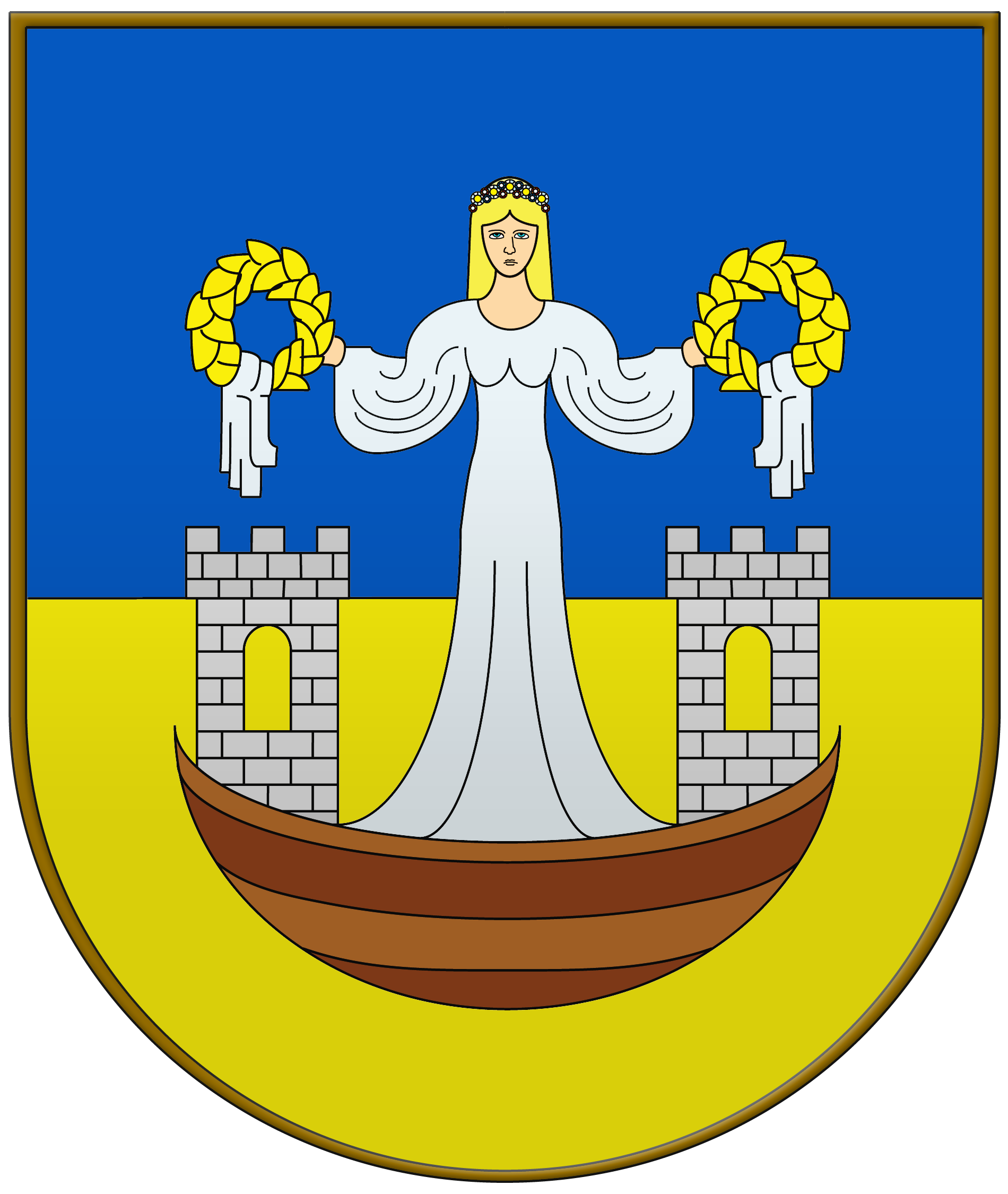
- Flag Coat of arms

- Location in Volyn Oblast Location in Ukraine
- Coordinates: 50°45′57″N 25°00′02″E
- Country: Ukraine
- Oblast: Volyn Oblast
- Raion: Lutsk Raion
- Hromada: Torchyn settlement hromada

Population (2022)
  - Total: 4,516
- Time zone: UTC+2 (EET)
  - Summer (DST): UTC+3 (EEST)

Torchyn (Ukrainian: Торчин; Polish: Torczyn) is a rural settlement in Lutsk Raion, Volyn Oblast, western Ukraine. It is located on the banks of the Serna in the drainage basin of the Dnieper. Population: 4,516 (2022 estimate).

== History ==
Torchin is mentioned in written sources since 1093. In 1340, Torchin, as the largest settlement in the region, became the parish center.

In 1660, Jan II Casimir confirmed the Magdeburg city status of Torchin by royal decree.

As of 1901, there were 8 tanneries, 2 water mills, a distillery, a brewery, a yeast factory, and a brick factory in Torchin.

During the occupation in 1941-1944, the Germans created a ghetto in Torchin for local Jews (about 1,500 people) and prisoners from nearby villages (together up to 3,000 people). On August 23, 1942, the ghetto residents were shot by the Germans.

Until 26 January 2024, Torchyn was designated urban-type settlement. On this day, a new law entered into force which abolished this status, and Torchyn became a rural settlement.

== Geography ==
The area of the settlement is 10.52 km². Torchyn is located in the south of Volyn Oblast (in the west of Lutsk Raion). The Serna River flows through the village. Torchyn is located on the Volhynian Upland.

The climate is moderately continental with mild winters (in January -4.4 °, -5.1 °) and warm wet summer (in July +18.8 °). Rainfall 550–640 mm per year.

Torchyn is the center of the Torchyn settlement territorial community.

== Economy ==
Torchin has a developed food industry. The Volynholding enterprise produces products under the Torchin Product trademark. In 2019, the enterprise was acquired by the world's largest food producer, the Swiss company Nestle.

=== Transportation ===
The closest railway station is in Lutsk. The settlement is on Highway H22 connecting Lutsk and Volodymyr.

== Notable people ==
- Jacek Rybiński, Polish Cistercian abbot
