= National Museum, Gdańsk =

Coordinates: 54°20′44″N 18°38′49″E

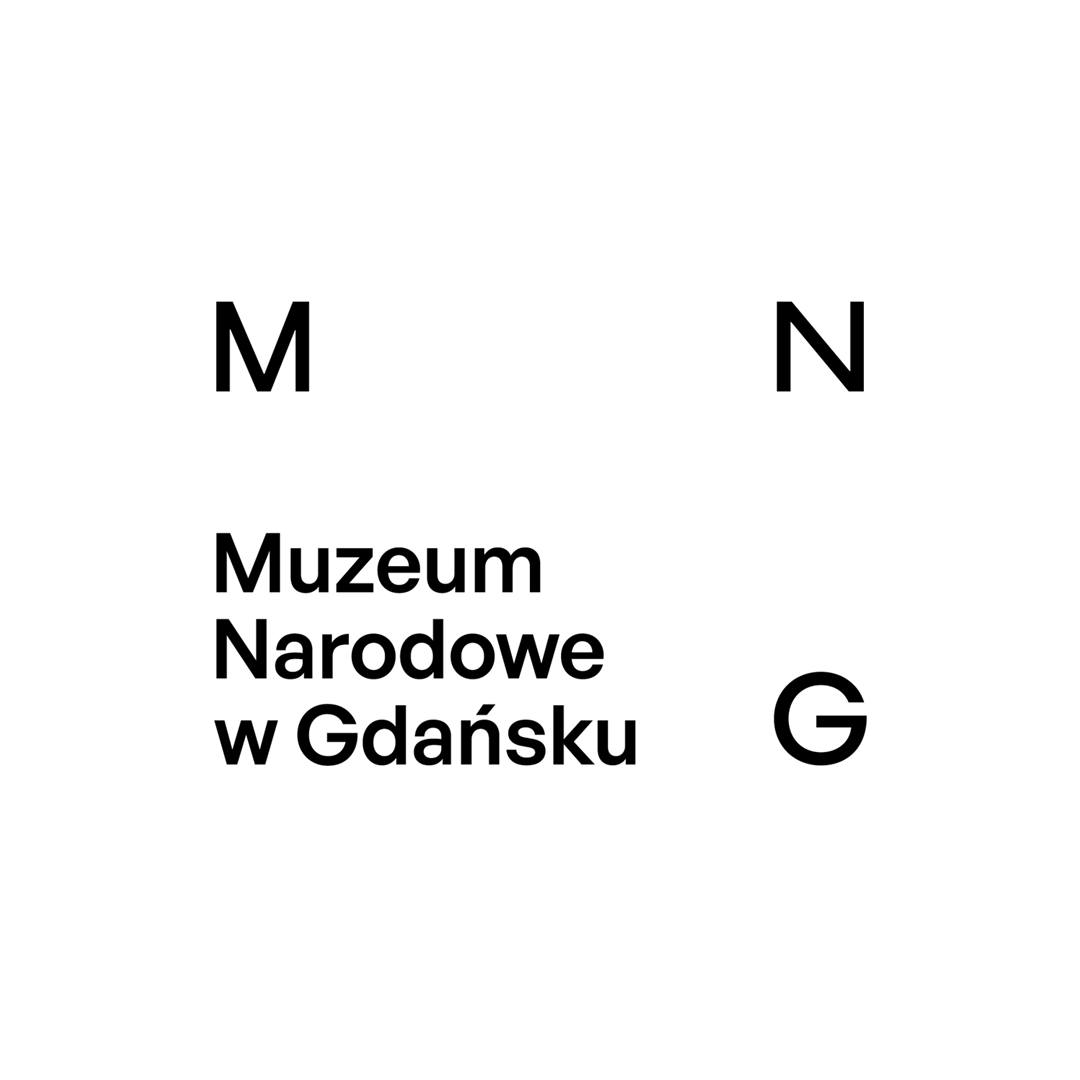

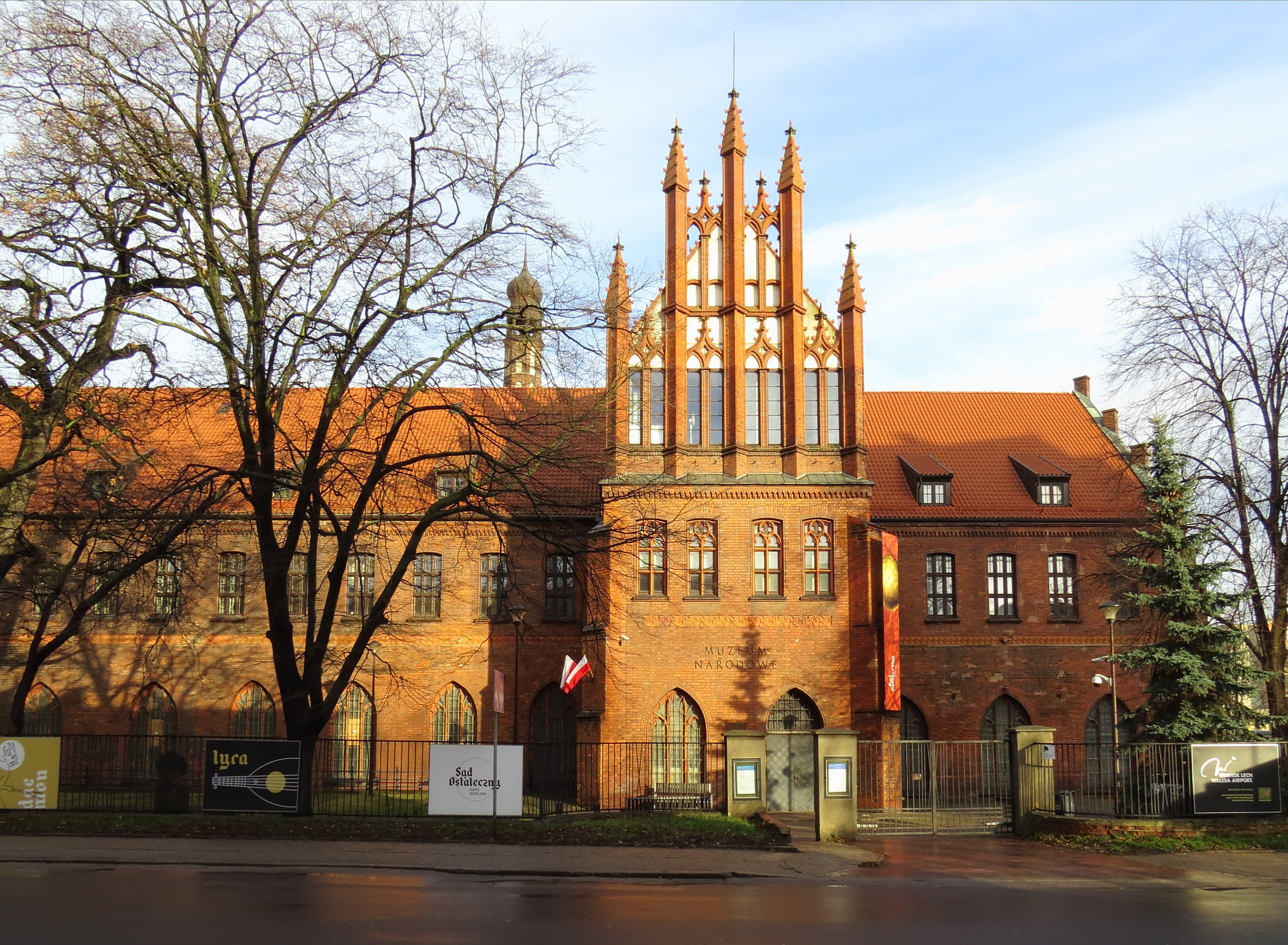
- Established: 1972
- Location: Gdańsk, Poland
- Type: National museum
- Directors: Jacek Friedrich, Ph.D.
- Website: mng.gda.pl

The National Museum in Gdańsk (Polish: Muzeum Narodowe w Gdańsku), established in 1972 in Gdańsk (although the history goes back the third quarter of 19th century), is one of the main branches of Poland's national museum system.

== History ==
Its main location is in the old late-Gothic Franciscan monastery, which has been used to house exhibits since the end of the 19th century. During that period it was known as Danziger Stadtmuseum, which held a sizeable collection of historical works of art. In 1884, the collection was enlarged with exhibits from the Danziger Kunstgewerbemuseum when the two institutions merged.

The core of the museum's collection constitutes the collection of Jacob Kabrun, which includes several thousand pictures, drawings and prints by European masters from the end of the fifteenth to the beginning of the nineteenth centuries.

After the end of the Second World War, when the town turned Polish, 65% of the main building of the museum was destroyed and much of the museum's collections were lost, including all the numismatic exhibits as well as works of art from the Far East. Also the library and some of the museum's records were lost or destroyed. The first post-war exhibition was opened in 1948 and the museum changed its name to "Pomeranian Museum in Gdańsk".

In 1956, Hans Memling's masterpiece Last Judgment returned to Gdańsk as well as part of the collections of paintings and prints. Originally the museum was located in the Opatów Palace in Oliwa and constituted the ethnographic department of the museum. Since 1989, the palace houses the museum's collection of modern art.

A number of other museums were established from the rich collections of the Pomeranian Museum, which include: National Maritime Museum (1960), the Archaeological Museum (1962) and the Gdańsk Historical Museum (1971). In 1972, it was renamed as the National Museum in Gdańsk.

In 1974, two paintings, namely the Anthony van Dyck sketch The Crucifixion, and the Pieter Brueghel the Younger painting Woman Carrying the Embers were stolen from the museum. In the case of the Brueghel painting, its theft was discovered when a museum employee accidentally knocked its frame from the wall, revealing the canvas on display to be a reproduction cut out of a magazine. It was later reported that a customs officer who had reported the illegal export of artworks through the port of Gdynia was set alight and killed shortly before he was to be interviewed by police, while authorities shut down the investigation into the thefts and the killing. In 2025, the Brueghel painting was finally located in the Museum Gouda in the Netherlands, where it was being displayed on loan from a private collection.

In 2017, 162,137 people visited the museum.

== Departments ==
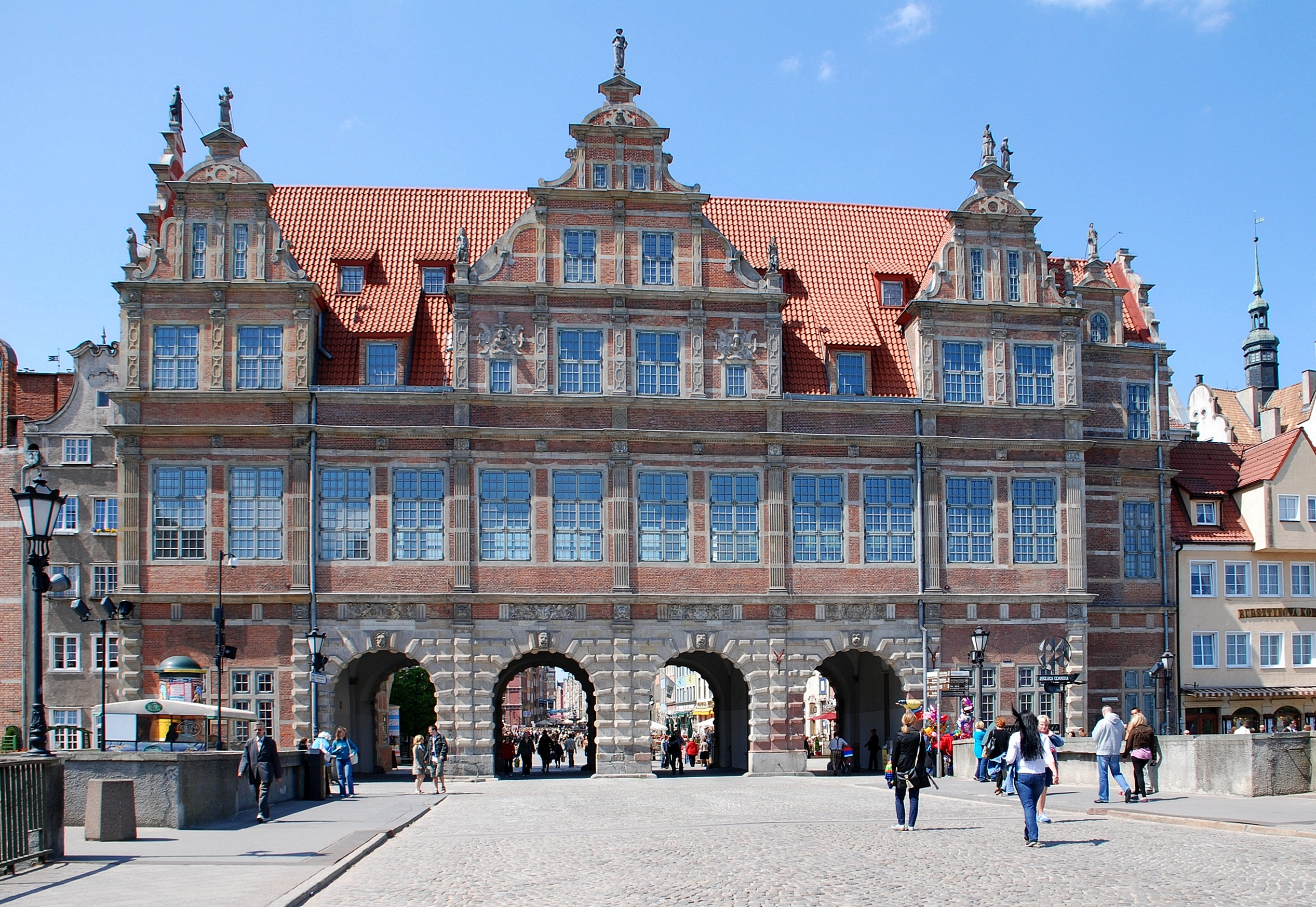
Green Gate in Gdańsk

Currently the museum has seven departments:

- Department of Ancient Art, contains Hans Memling's Last Judgment
- Department of Modern Art, in the Opatów Palace in Oliwa
- Ethnography Department, in the Spichlerz Opacki ("Abbot's Granary")
- Green Gate Department
- Gdańsk Photography Gallery
- Museum of the National Anthem in Będomin
- Museum of Szlachta Traditions in Waplewo Wielkie

== Museum directors ==
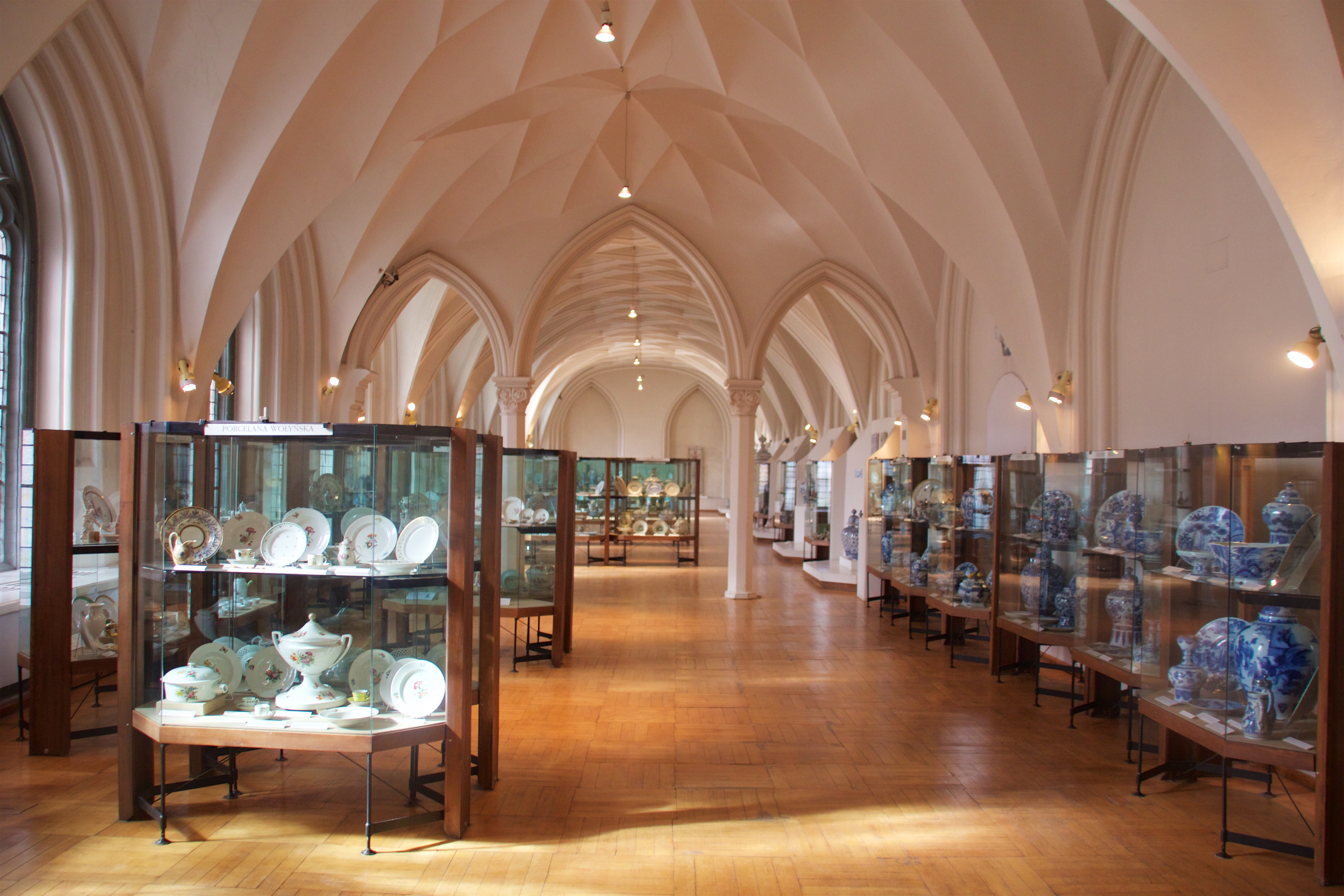
Interior of the museum's main building

- Jan Chranicki (1948–1970)
- Janusz Wąsowicz (1970–1974)
- Jan Przała (1974–1980)
- Józef Kuszewski (1980–1983)
- Teresa Milewska (1983–1988)
- Tadeusz Piaskowski (1988–2004)
- Wojciech Bonisławski (2004–2019)
- Jacek Friedrich (2020)

== Gallery ==
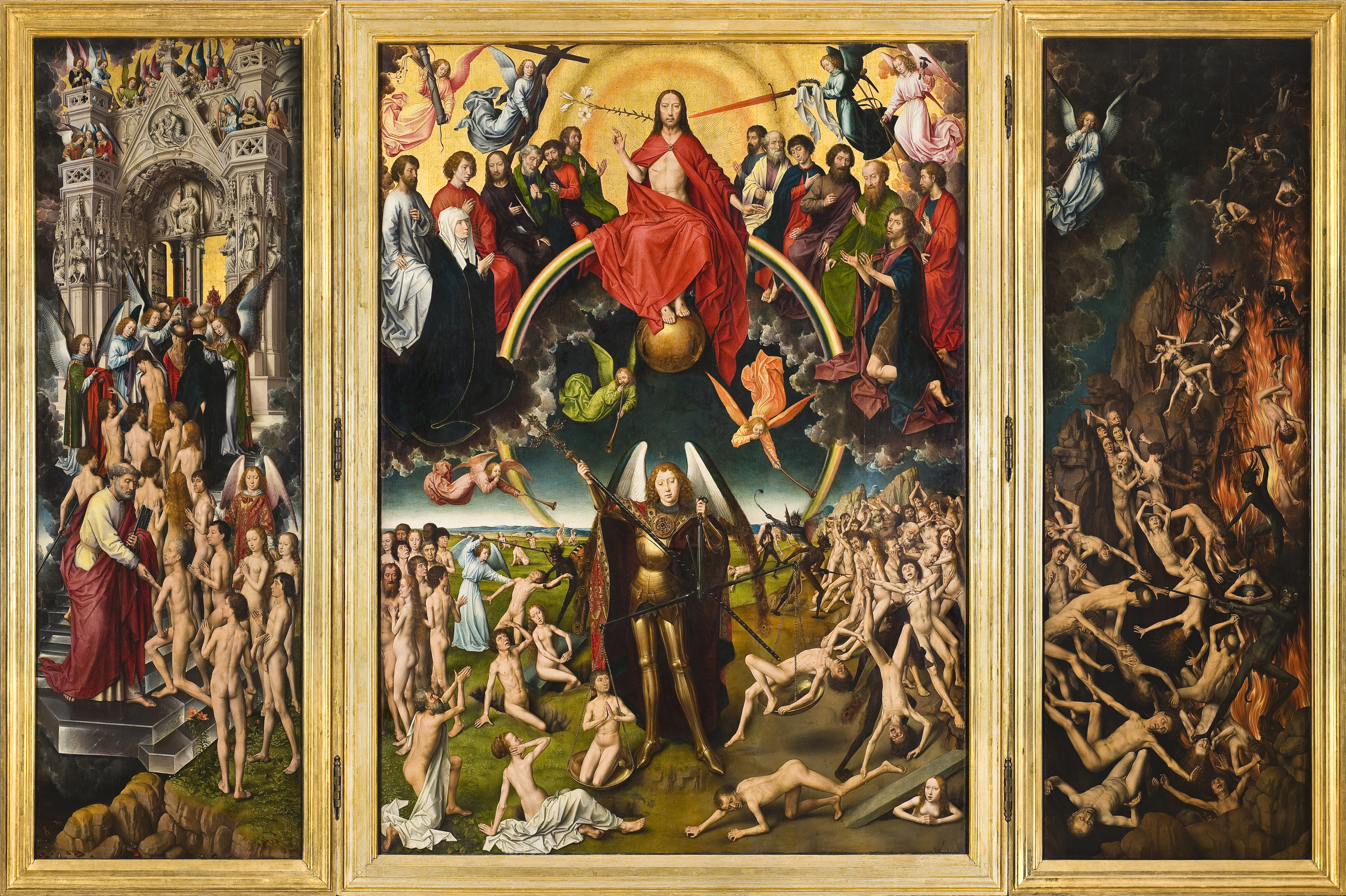
The Last Judgement, Hans Memling, (late 1460s)

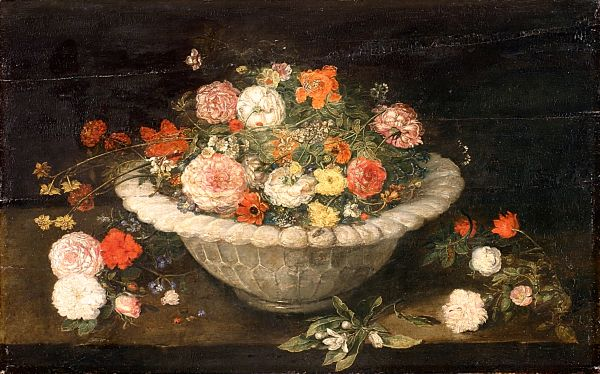
Bowl with Flowers, Jan Brueghel the Younger, (ca.1630)

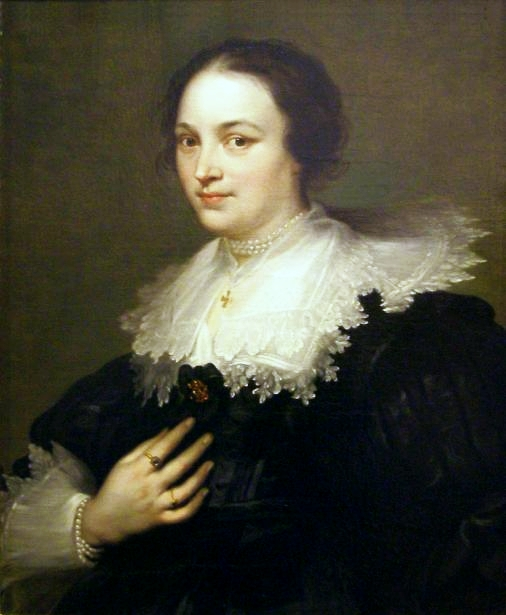
Portrait of a Woman, Anthony van Dyck, (ca. 1630)

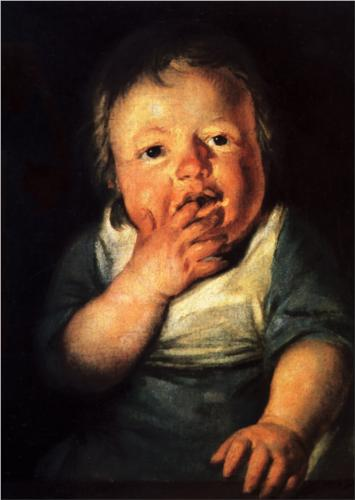
Study of a Child, Jacob Jordaens, (1626)

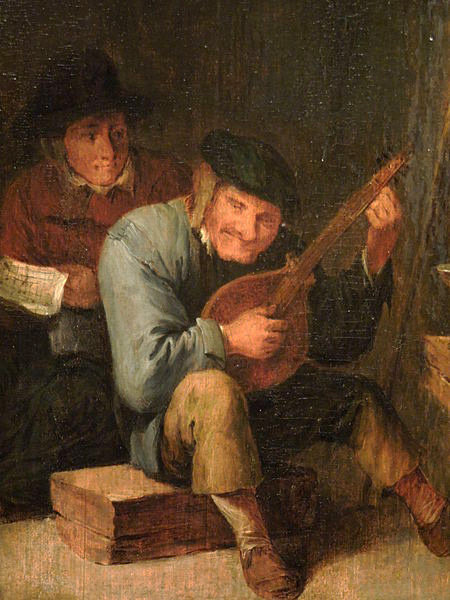
A Musician and a Singer, David Teniers the Younger, (ca.1650)

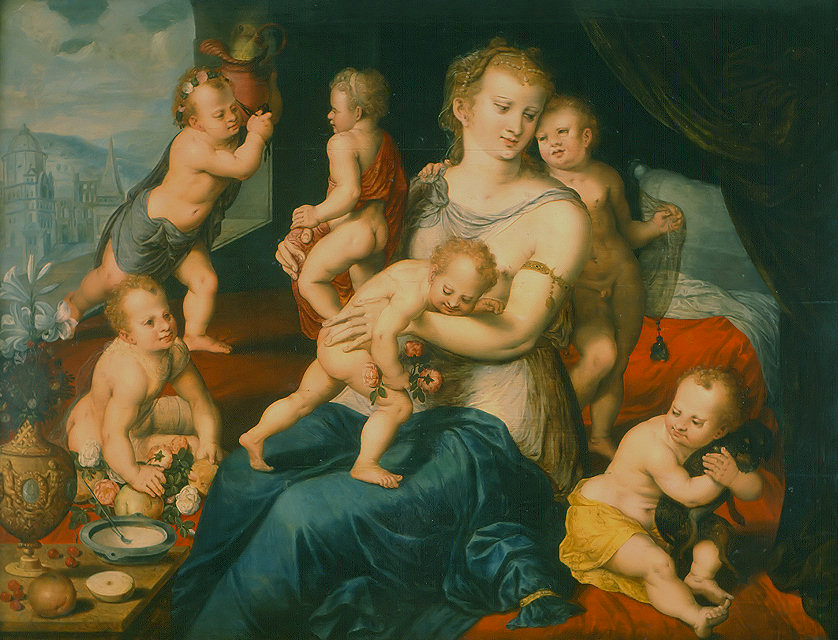
Caritas, Frans Floris

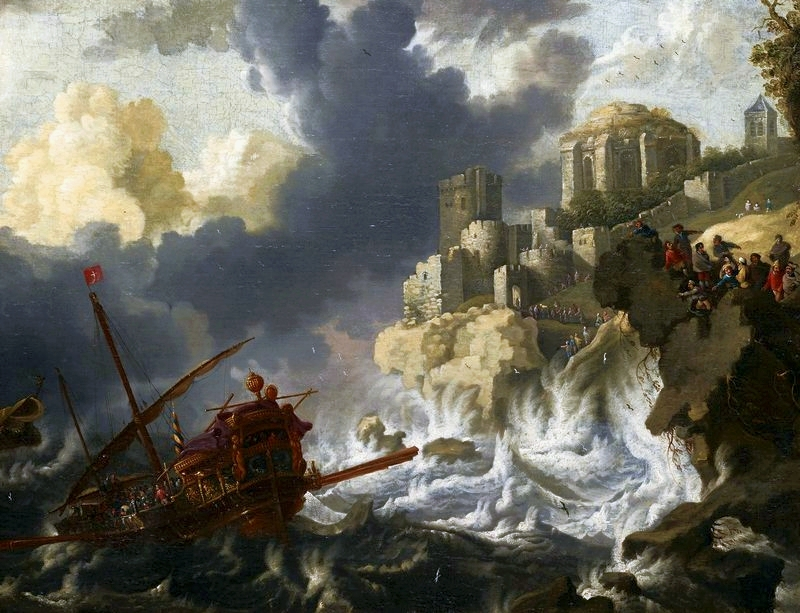
Ships at Sea, Jan Peeters I, (ca.1650)

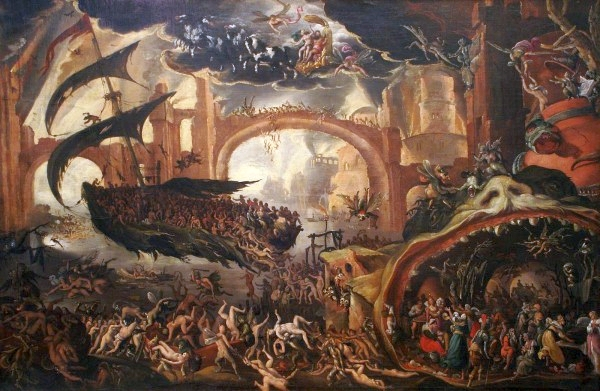
Charon's Boat, Isaac Claesz. van Swanenburg, (ca.1625)

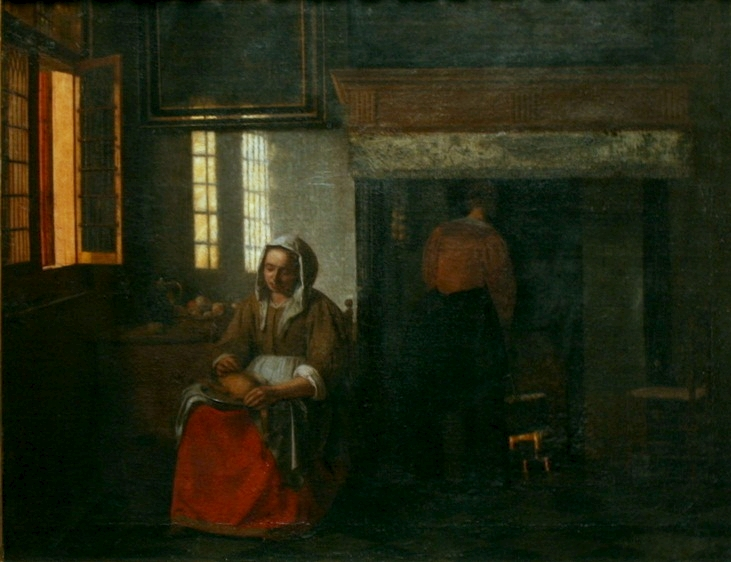
Woman Plucking a Duck, Pieter de Hooch, (between 1665 and 1668)

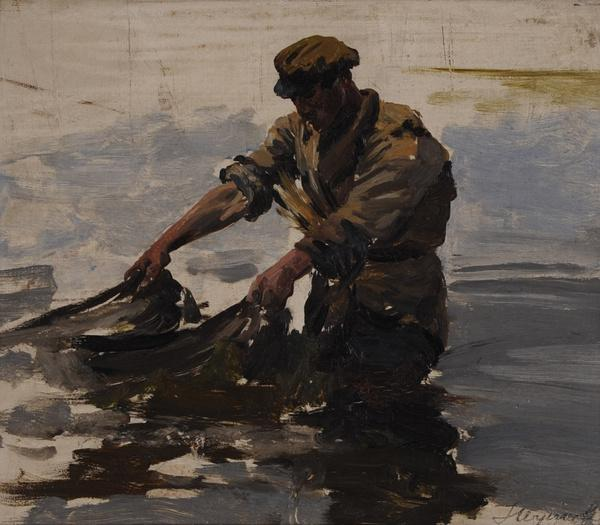
Fisherman with Nets, Leon Wyczółkowski, (ca.1890)

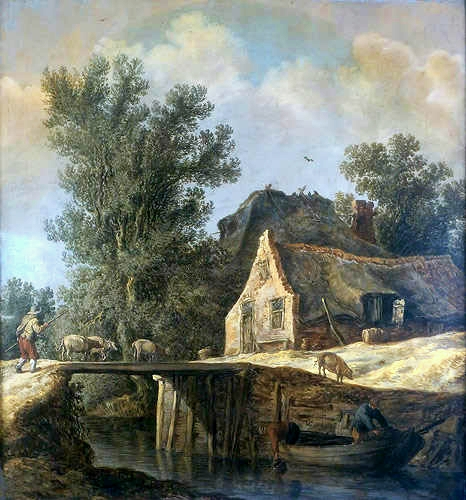
Cottages by the canal, Jan van Goyen, was part of the Jacques Goudstikker collection

== See also ==
- List of registered museums in Poland
