= Abbot's Palace (Oliwa) =

18th-century Rococo palace in Gdańsk, Poland

Coordinates: 54°24′39″N 18°33′37″E

Abbots' Palace in Oliwa
- Pałac Opatów w Oliwie
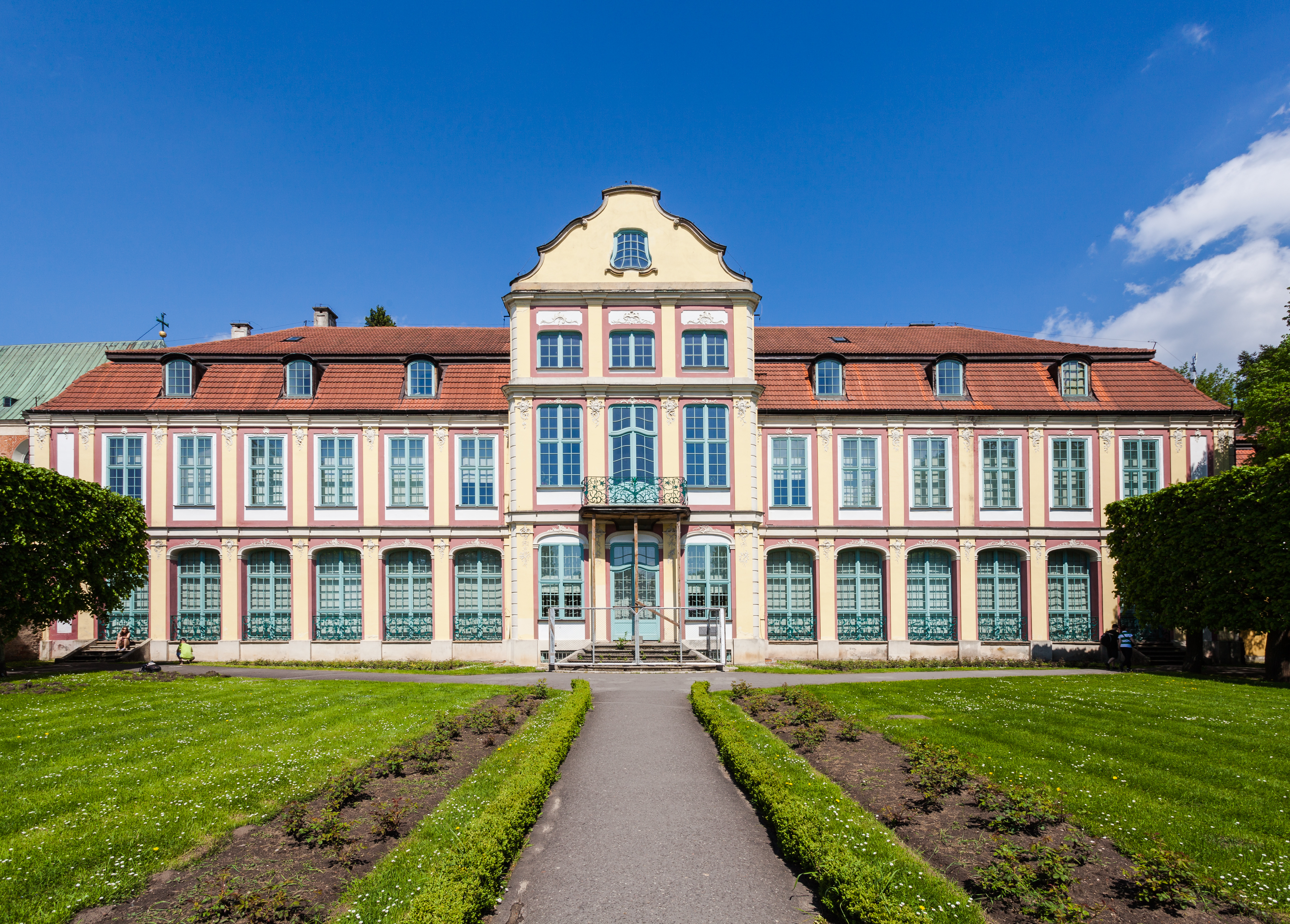
- Southern façade of the palace
- Interactive map of the Abbots' Palace in Oliwa area

General information
- Architectural style: Rococo
- Location: Gdańsk, Poland
- Construction started: 15th century. Major construction 1754-56.
- Completed: 1756
- Demolished: 1945
- Client: Jacek Rybiński

Historic Monument of Poland
- Designated: 2017-11-22
- Reference no.: Dz. U. z 2017 poz. 2277

The Abbots' Palace in Oliwa (Polish: Pałac Opatów w Oliwie) is a rococo palace in Oliwa, a quarter of Gdańsk. It houses the Department of Modern Art of the National Museum in Gdańsk, and along with the Cistercian-Cathedral complex in Oliwa it is listed as a Historic Monument of Poland.

== History ==
The first portion of the palace, the "Old Palace" was constructed in the 15th century. Later, in the first half of the sixteen hundreds a "New Palace" was added, which served as the residency of the then abbot of the Cistercians, Jan Grabiński. The final additions to the palace were made between 1754 and 1756, and were funded by another Cistercian abbot, Jacek Rybiński.

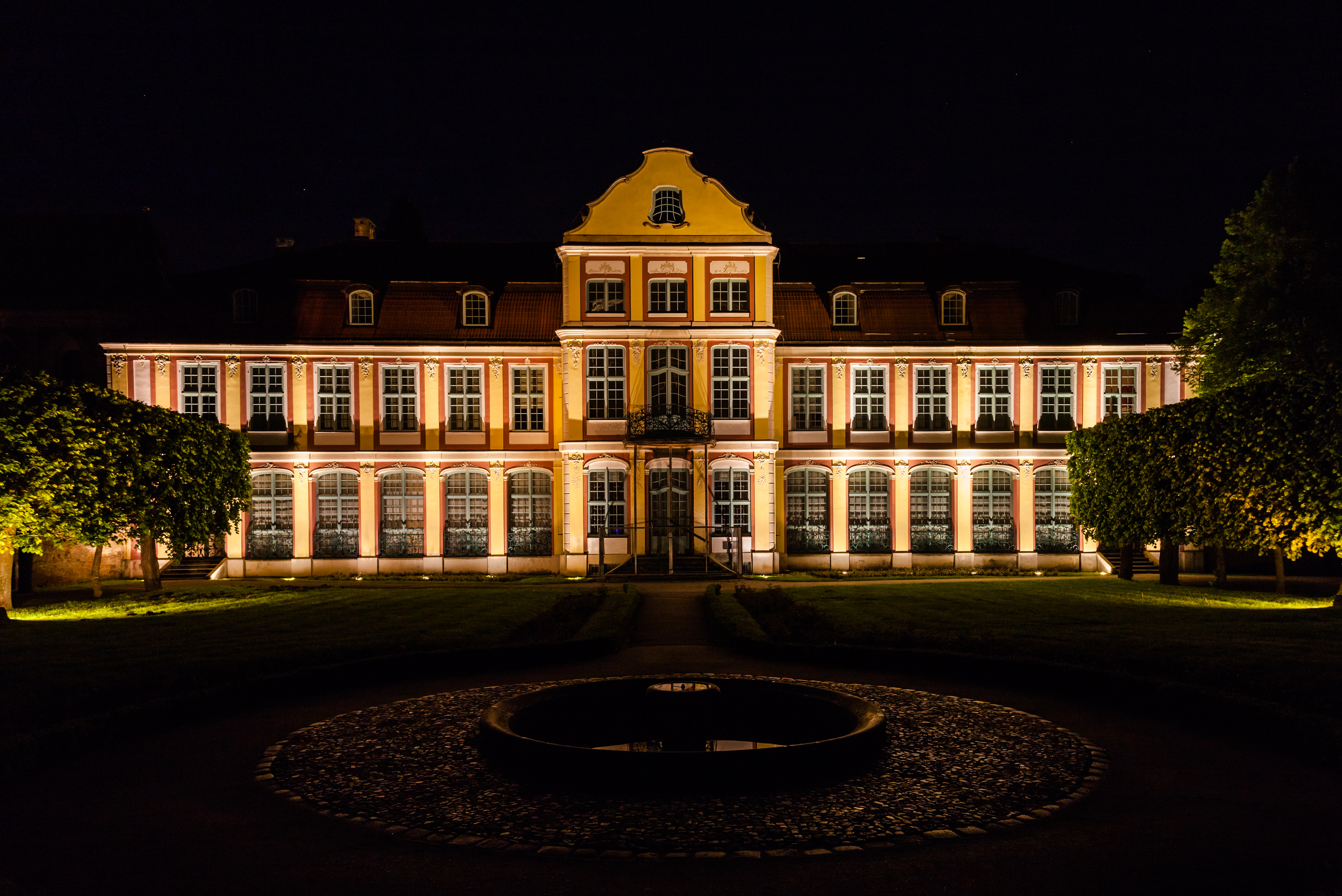
Night view of the palace.

After the partitions of Poland the area became part of Prussia, in 1831 real estate of the Cistercians was secularized and the palace became property of the House of Hohenzollern. From 1796 until 1836 the Bishops of Warmia, Karl von Hohenzollern-Hechingen and Joseph von Hohenzollern-Hechingen resided in the Palace. It remained empty until 1869 when Maria Anna von Hohenzollern-Hechingen, niece of Joseph, took up residence there. After her death in 1888 the ownership of the palace was taken over by the settlement of Oliwa, which used it for offices and apartments.

During the interwar period of the Free City of Danzig the palace contained a museum which housed exhibitions on the history of the region. The director in charge of the museum was a Nazi activist named Erich Keyser.

In 1945, at the end of World War II (during which time it served as an arms depot) it was set on fire by German troops who sought to clear the terrain in front of the advancing Red Army.

The palace was rebuilt in 1965 through the efforts of the Muzeum Pomorskie w Gdańsku (Pomeranian Museum in Gdańsk). It initially served as the ethnographic department of the museum. In 1972 the Museum was elevated to a status of a National Museum.

Since 1989 the palace contains the Department of Modern Art of the Polish National Museum in Gdańsk. In February 1990 a special gallery devoted to contemporary Polish art was established. Permanent exhibitions include works by Polish artists from 19th and 20th century (painting, sculpture and ceramics). Some of the artists whose works are on display include Zbigniew Pronaszko, Jan Cybis, Henryk Stażewski, Andrzej Wróblewski, Tadeusz Kantor, Jerzy Nowosielski, Alfred Lenica, Jan Lebenstein, Teresa Pągowska, Zdzisław Beksiński, Edward Dwurnik and Władysław Hasior. It also houses the "Promotional Gallery" which exhibits works by young artists.
