= Alfred Lenica =

Polish painter (1899–1977)

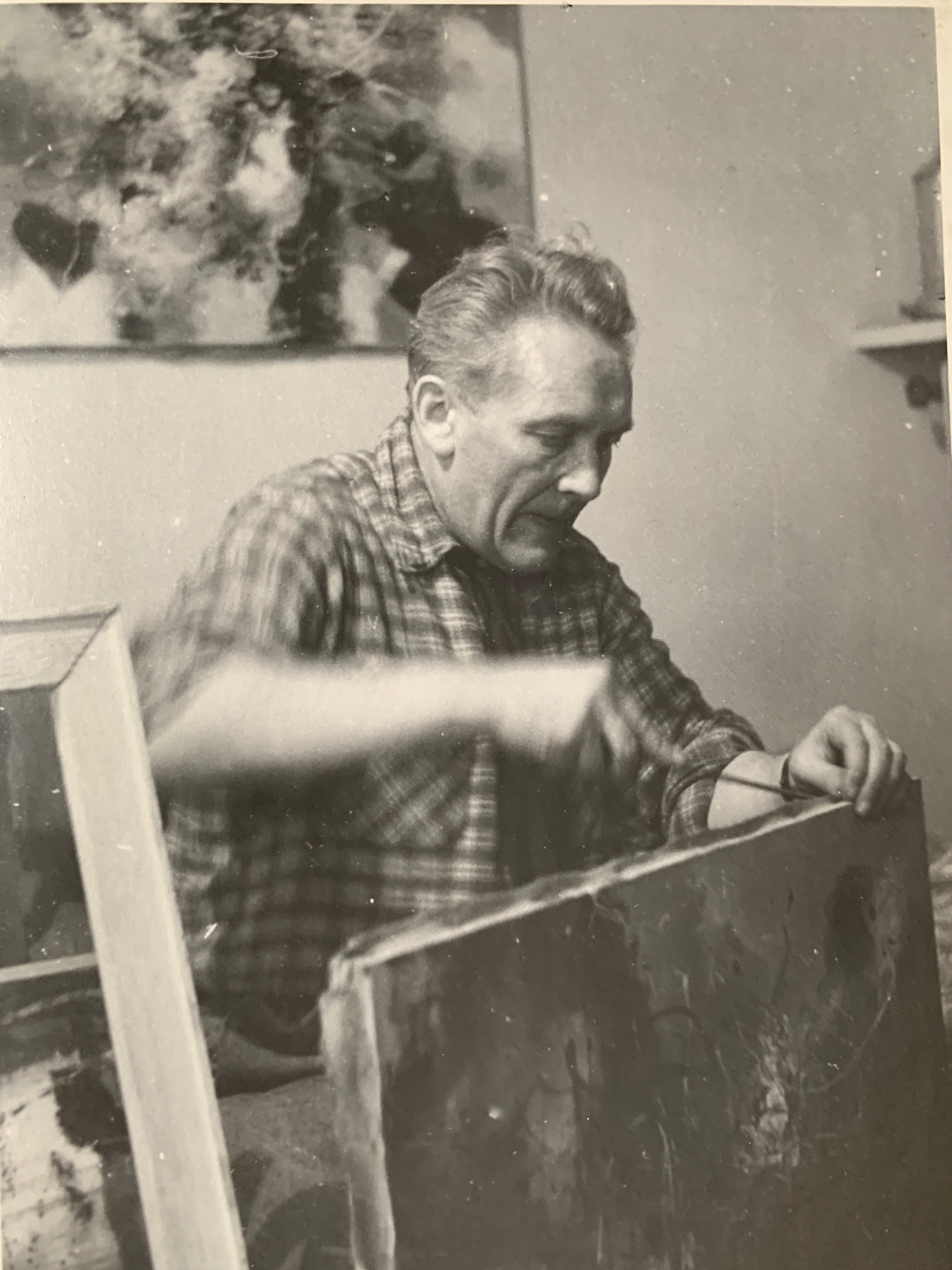
- Born: 4 August 1899; Pabianice, Congress Poland
- Died: 16 April 1977 (aged 77); Warsaw, Poland
- Resting place: Powązki Military Cemetery
- Citizenship: Poland
- Education: University of Poznań
- Known for: Painting
- Movement: Socialist realism, Surrealism, Expressionism, Cubism

Alfred Lenica (August 4, 1899 in Pabianice - April 16, 1977 in Warsaw) was a Polish painter.

== Biography ==
Alfred Lenica's father was a foreman at a Kindler factory before being fired for drunkenness, for which he was sent to a psychiatric hospital. In moments of sobriety, the father would easily draw various animals for his son. Alfred became an orphan at the age of 10.

He began his studies in 1922 at the Faculty of Law and Economics of the Adam Mickiewicz University in Poznań. At the same time, he studied music at the Conservatory of Music. He deepened his interests in painting under the supervision of Piotr Kubowicz, studying at the Poznań Institute of Fine Arts run by Adam Hannytkiewicz.

In the 1930s, Lenica painted figurative paintings, mainly still lifes and landscapes, inspired by cubism.

At the beginning of World War II, the Lenica family, displaced from Poznań, went to Kraków. The war was a turning point in the painter's career. The Kraków artistic community centered around Tadeusz Kantor, and especially his friendship with Jerzy Kujawski, deepened the painter's interest in the avant-garde.

In 1945, Lenica returned to Poznań, where he became involved in artistic activity. In 1947, he became a co-founder of the avant-garde group 4F+R. After years of trials and exploration, Lenica increasingly gravitated towards abstraction and tachisme. In 1948, he took part in the 1st Exhibition of Modern Art in Kraków organized by Tadeusz Kantor. In 1949, he led a team of painters decorating the Bazar Hotel in Poznań.

In addition to his explorations and fascination with abstraction, Lenica actively participated in the socialist realism movement, creating many realistic paintings in the early 1950s. In the first half of the 1950s, during the period of socialist realism, Lenica interrupted his creative experiments, turning towards the artistic doctrine introduced by political order. Due to his political beliefs, this was a return to the socially and politically engaged paintings painted in the 1930s. At that time, he painted such paintings as "Młody Bierut w robotników" (Young Bierut among workers) (1949), "Pstrowski i znajomze", "Przyjęcie do Parti", "Czerwony plakat" (Red poster) (1950). For his own use, he also tried to combine formal experiments with ideologically engaged themes, as in the work "Tracimy dniówki" from 1953, in which he used collage and monotype.

By 1955, Lenica's painting style had become established. The style was a combination of Tachisme, Surrealism, Informal and dripping. Large-format oil paintings were created using a technique previously developed by the artist (obtaining glimpses of colour from under successive layers of paint), which he then improved and developed. Lenica was keen to use varnishes and industrial paints.

Lenica travelled extensively; at the invitation of the UN, he stayed in Geneva at the turn of 1959–1960, where he made the mural "Three Elements" (Water, Fire and Love) at the headquarters of the organisation. He maintained regular contact with the local artistic avant-garde, exhibited with the Kraków Group, took part in most of the plein-airs in Osieki near Koszalin, and participated in the symposium "Art in a Changing World" in 1966 in Puławy.

In 1973, he painted a series of 14 paintings titled "Chile, Chile" which was the result of Lenica's visit to Chile a few years before.

He is buried in the Powązki Military Cemetery in Warsaw in section B35-3-3. He had two children, Jan Lenica and Danuta Konwicka. His son-in-law was Tadeusz Konwicki.
