= Zaspa =

- Former district (dzielnica)
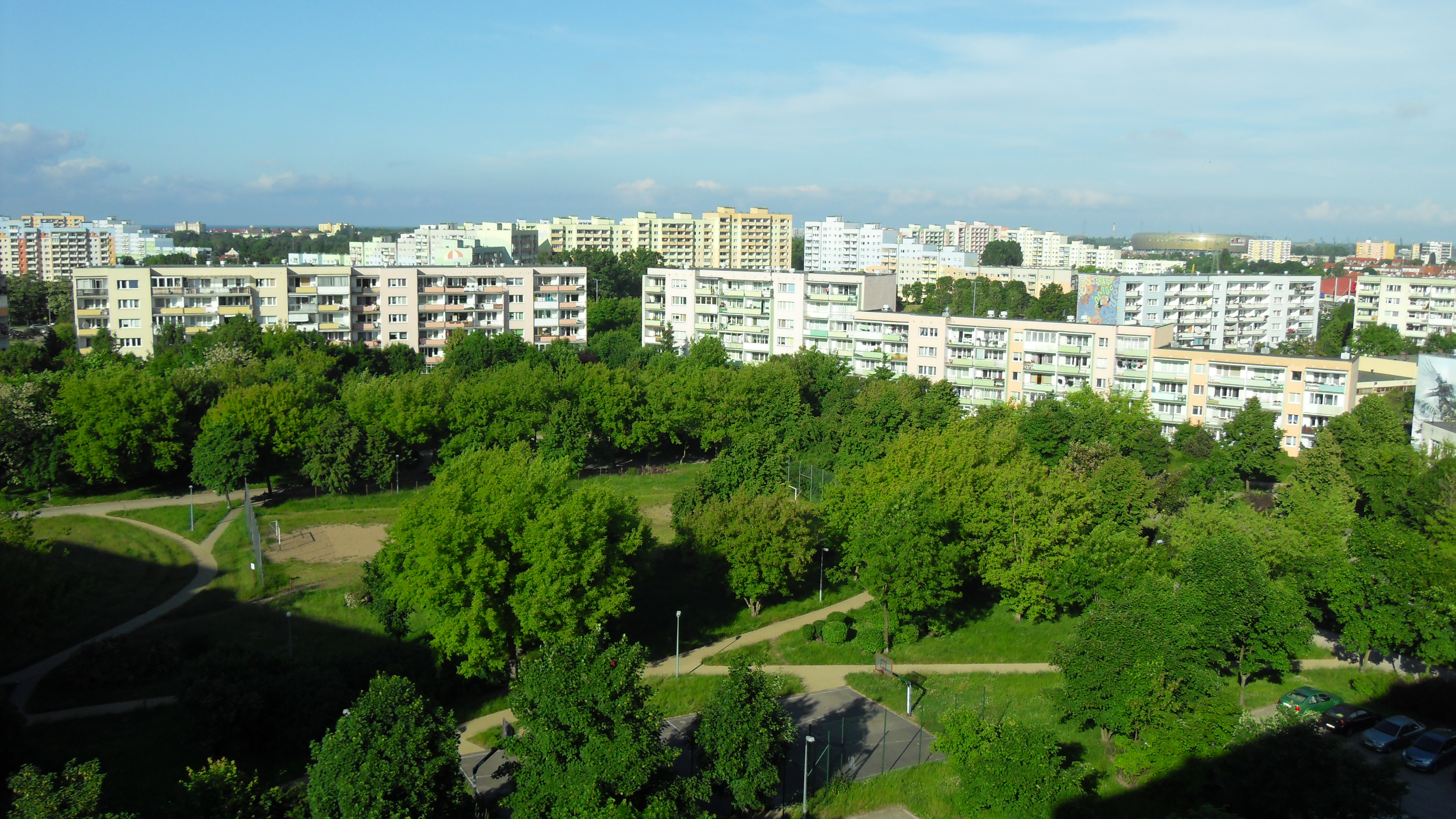
- Housing in Zaspa

- Location of Zaspa within Gdańsk
- Coordinates: 54°24′N 18°38′E
- Country: Poland
- Voivodeship: Pomeranian
- County/City: Gdańsk
- Within city limits: 1914

Area
  - Total: 3.2 km^{2} (1.2 sq mi)

Population
  - Total: 31,589
  - Density: 9,900/km^{2} (26,000/sq mi)
- Time zone: UTC+1 (CET)
  - Summer (DST): UTC+2 (CEST)

Zaspa (Polish pronunciation: [ˈzaspa]; German: Saspe [ˈzaspə]) is an area of Gdańsk, Poland, located in the northern part of the city. It is divided into two administrative districts: Zaspa-Młyniec and Zaspa-Rozstaje. It is located on the former grounds of an airport.

== Location ==
Zaspa borders Przymorze Wielkie and Przymorze Małe to the north, Brzeźno to the east, Wrzeszcz Dolny to the east and south, and Wrzeszcz Górny, Strzyża, and Oliwa to the west.

== History ==
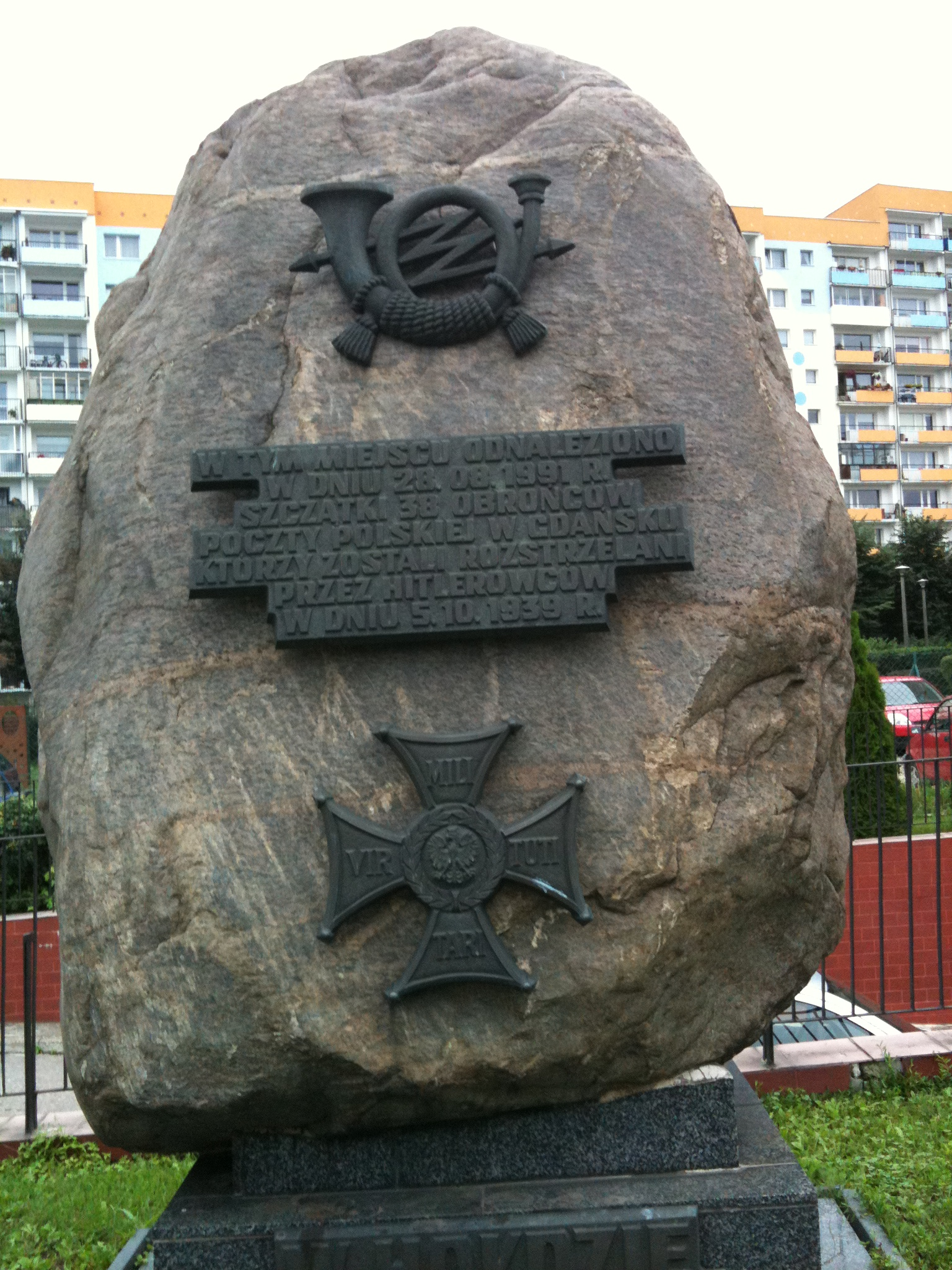
Memorial at the site of the former mass grave of the defenders of the Polish Post Office

Zaspa originated as a small village on the western shore of the now-nonexistent Zaspa Lake, owned by the Oliwa Abbey. It quickly grew to encompass a significant amount of land on the Baltic shore. Several manors were built on its land, growing to 20 in number. It was a position for artillery during the Siege of Danzig in 1734 and also saw direct warfare during the siege.

As of 1781, Zaspa, known as Saspe in German, still largely rural, had 92 inhabitants in total. In 1867, railways started running through the area and it became increasingly industrialized during the 19th century, although the locations where that was most prominent was in modern Letnica, where most of its 1895 population of 772 resided. Saspe also became home to a military installation, known as the Schießstände Saspe, which functioned primarily as a shooting range.

The flat and sparsely-developed terrain of Saspe was conducive to the construction of an airport. In 1913, a small airfield was constructed near the range for military purposes, which was used for civilian aviation as well once the Free City of Danzig became an independent state. Saspe became part of Danzig in 1914. It became home to several institutions, including a flying club and glider workshops.

During World War II, on October 5, 1939, the Germans carried out the execution of the defenders of the Polish Post Office in Danzig in the district. There are memorials to the defenders at the site of the execution and at the site of their former mass grave, which was discovered in 1991. The defenders were then reburied at the cemetery of victims of Nazi Germany in Zaspa in 1992.

Saspe suffered significant damage during the Siege of Danzig in 1945, as the airport and surrounding infrastructure were crucial to the German defensive effort. After the war, the airport was rebuilt. By the late 1960s, the airport was becoming dilapidated, with a replacement already in the works in Matarnia, today known as Gdańsk Lech Wałęsa Airport. In 1969, a contest was held for plans for developing the former airport grounds.

The contest was won by the Miastoprojekt, conceived by a group of architects, which suggested the construction of several high-rise apartment blocks where the airport had once been. The last plane arrived at the old airport in 1974; that same year, the first inhabitants of the new developments moved in. By 1990, it was already inhabited by 31,000 people. That year, the large population resulted in it being split into two districts, Zaspa-Młyniec and Zaspa-Rozstaje.

The area was visited by Pope John Paul II in 1987. Since the 1990s, it has become a major location for street art, with murals adorning many of its buildings.

== Gallery ==
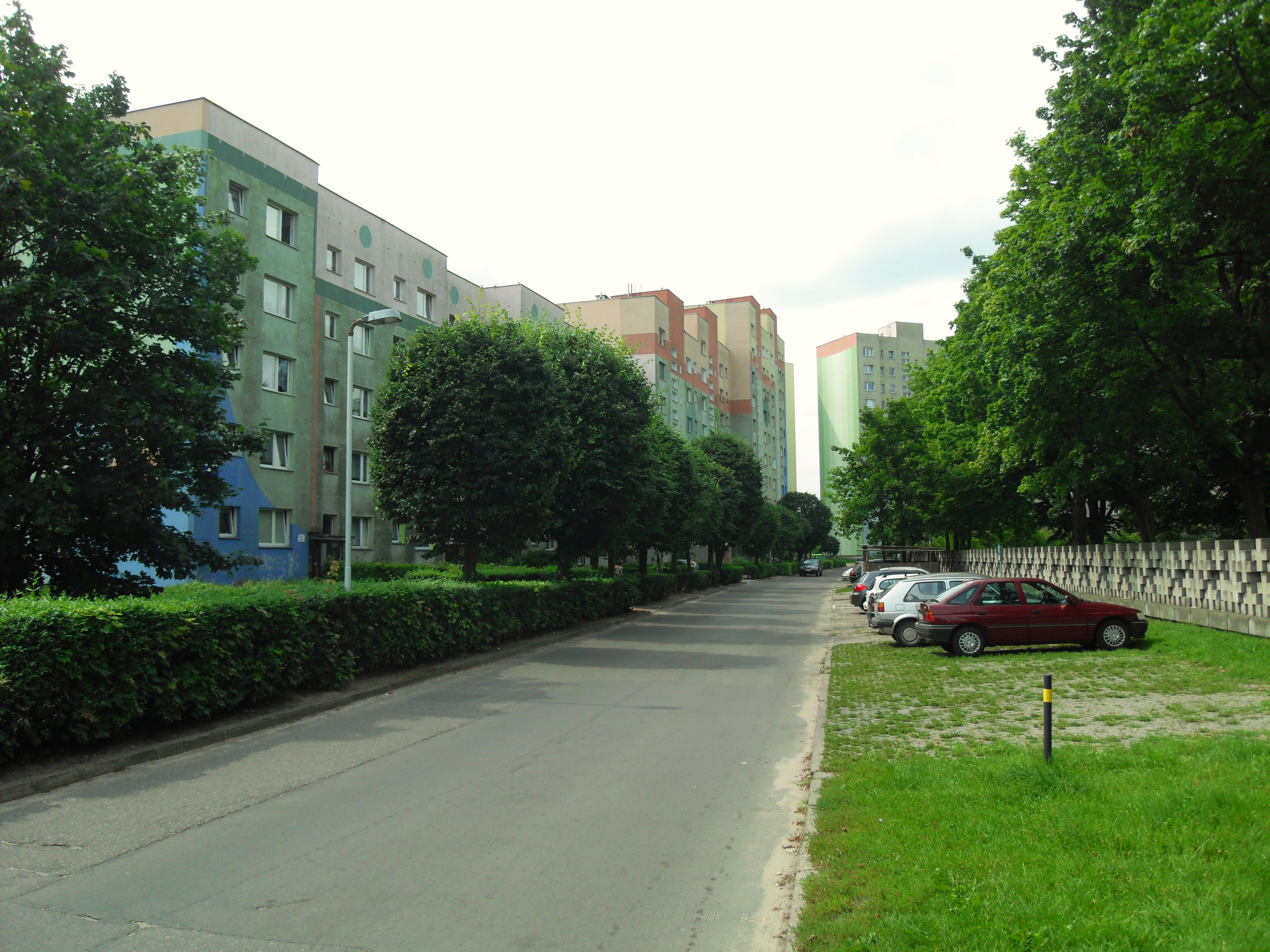
Ciołkowski Street

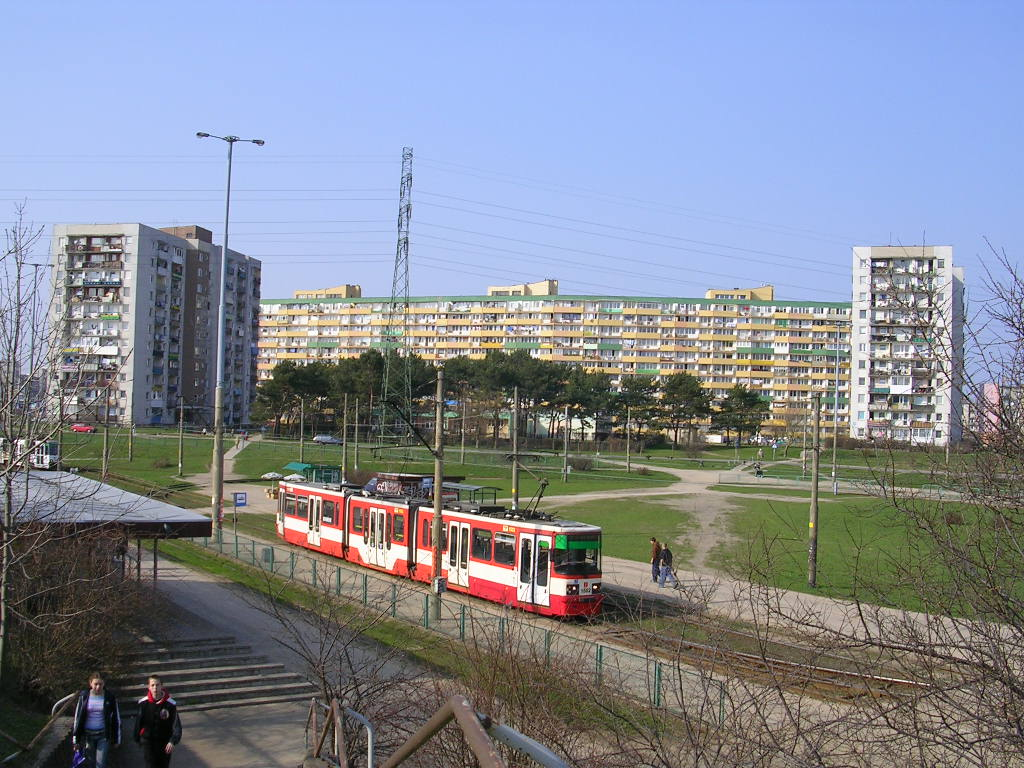
Gdańsk Zaspa tram loop

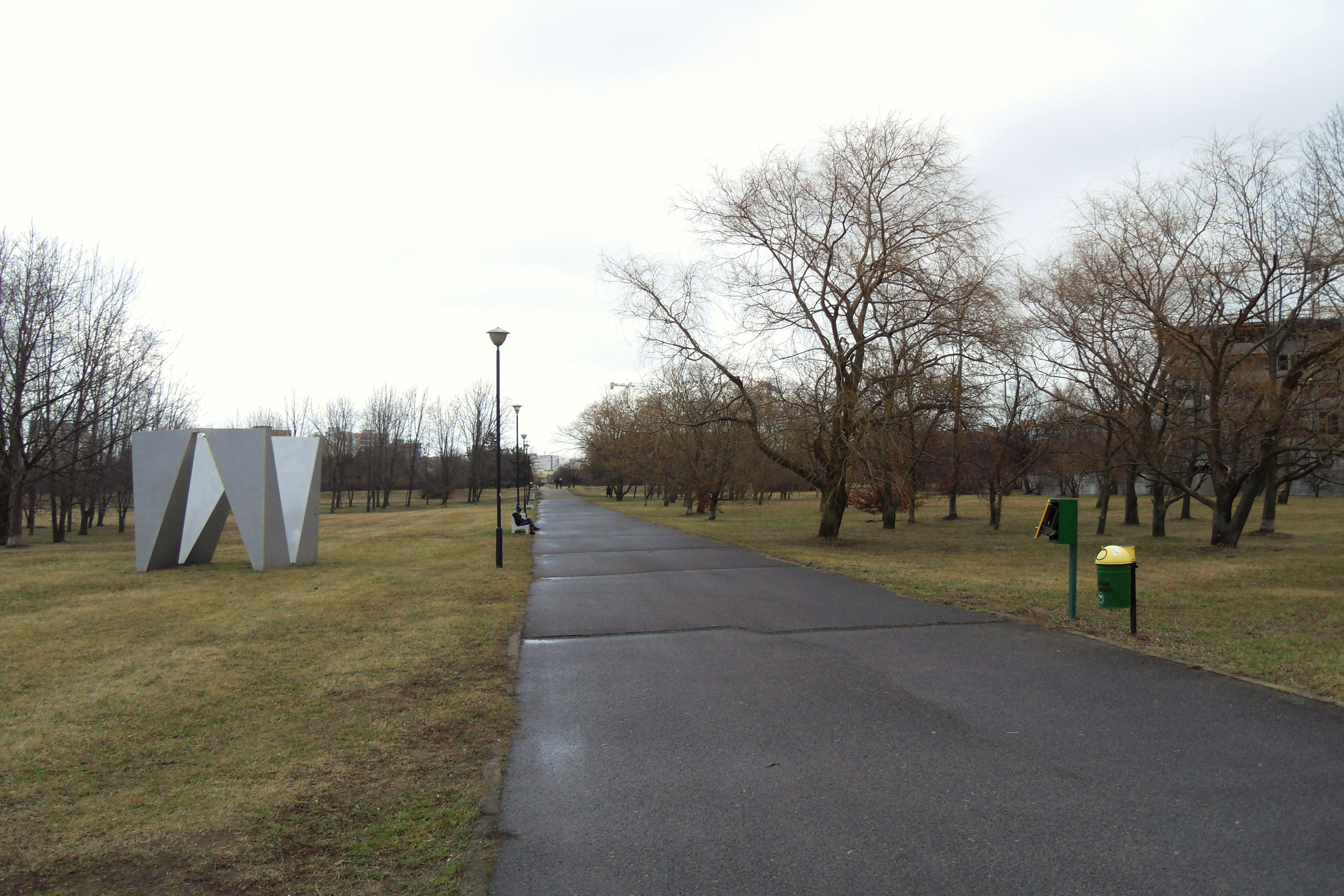
Zaspa Park

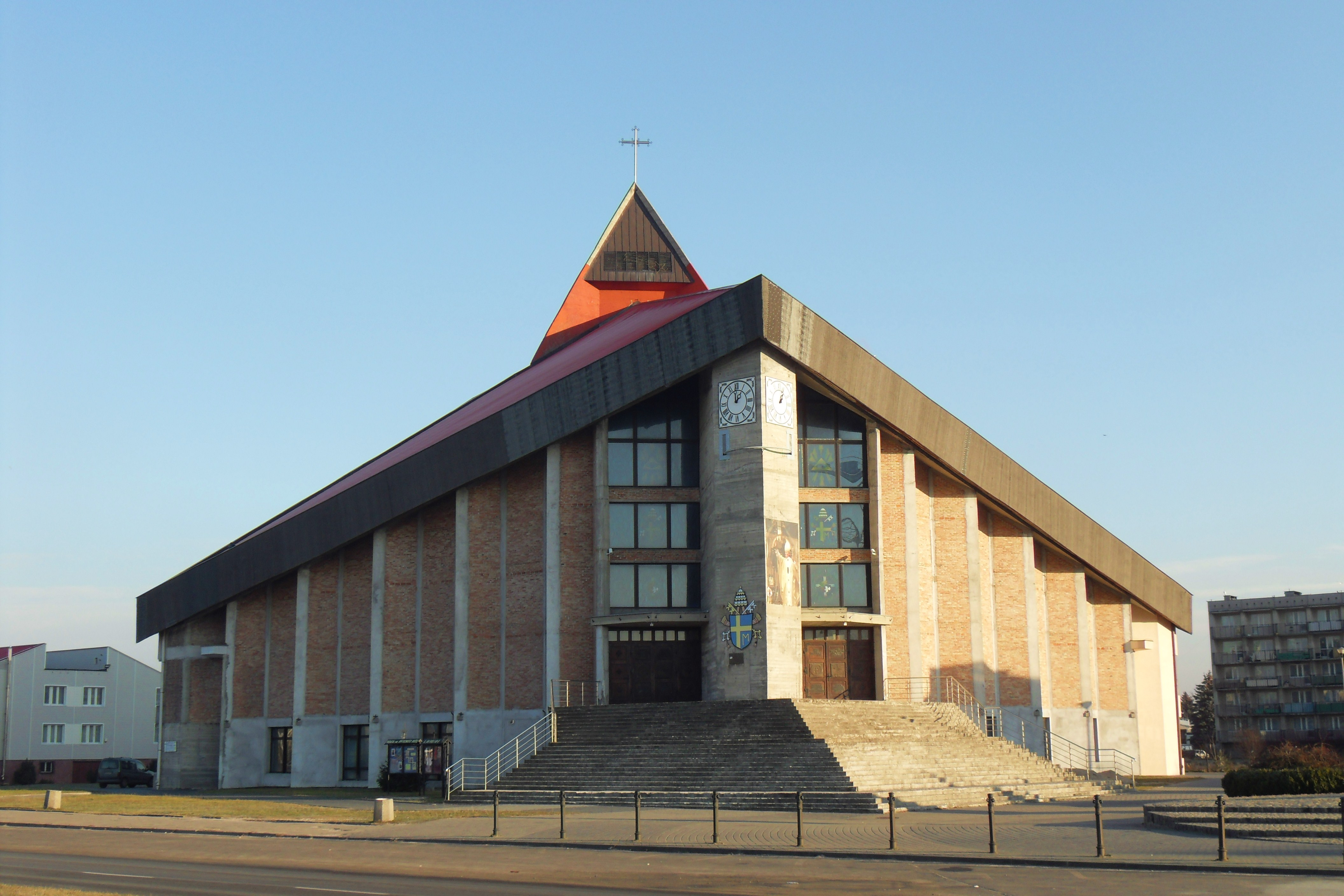
Church of Divine Providence

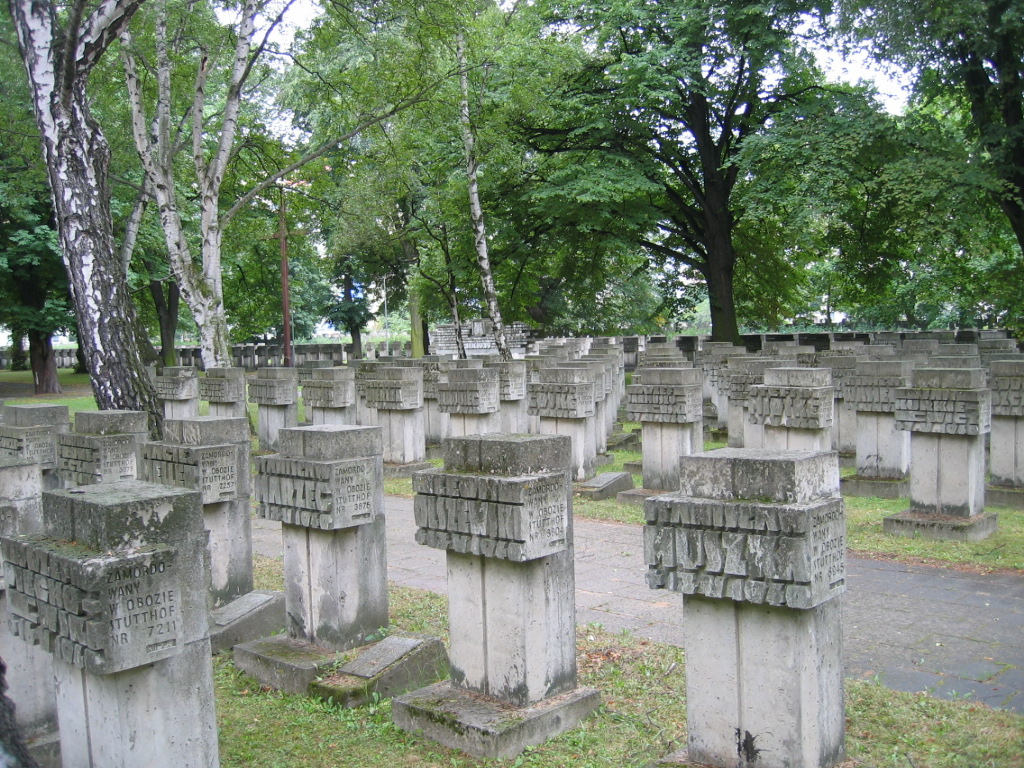
Zaspa Cemetery

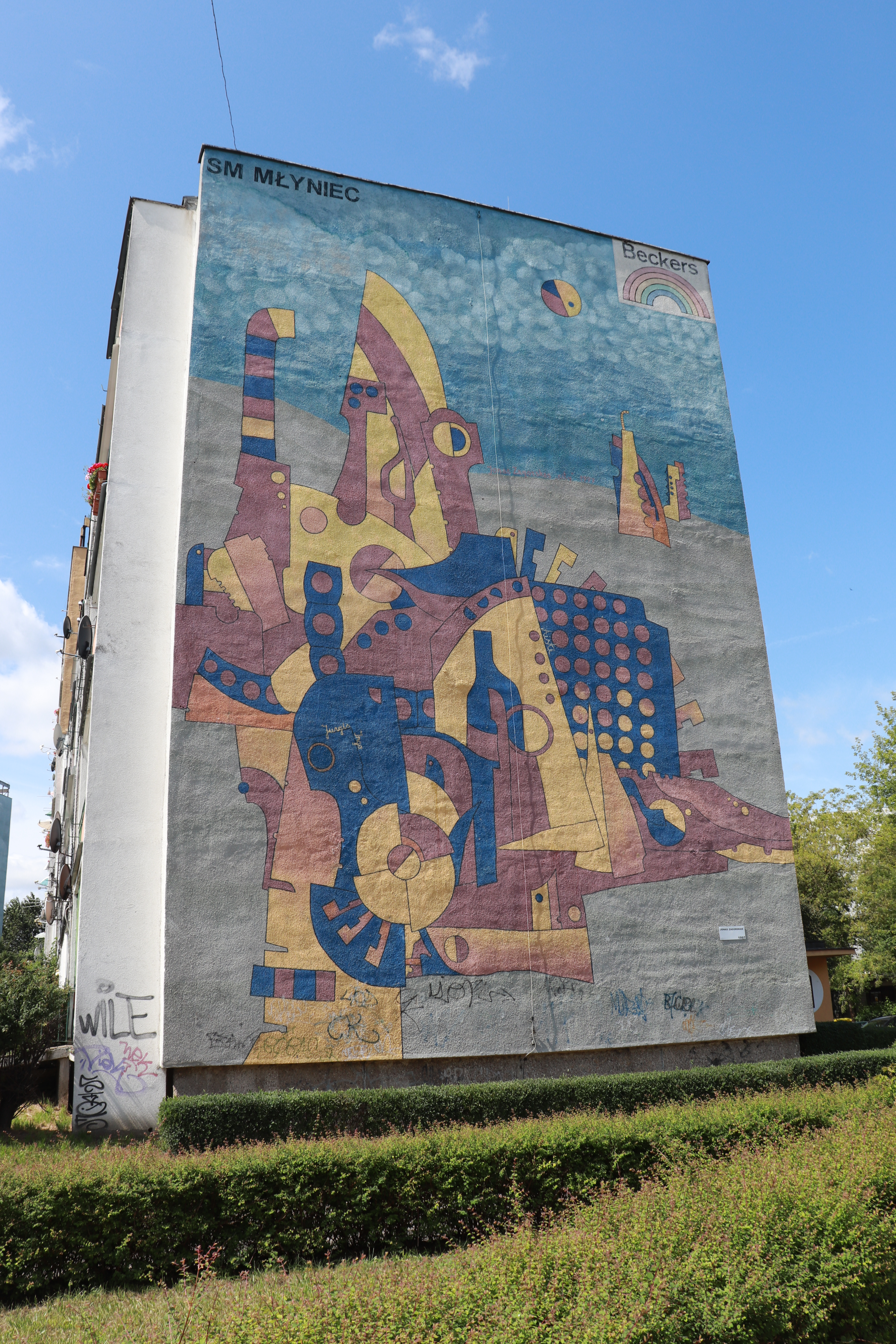
One of many murals in Zaspa
