= Wrzeszcz Dolny =

- District (dzielnica)
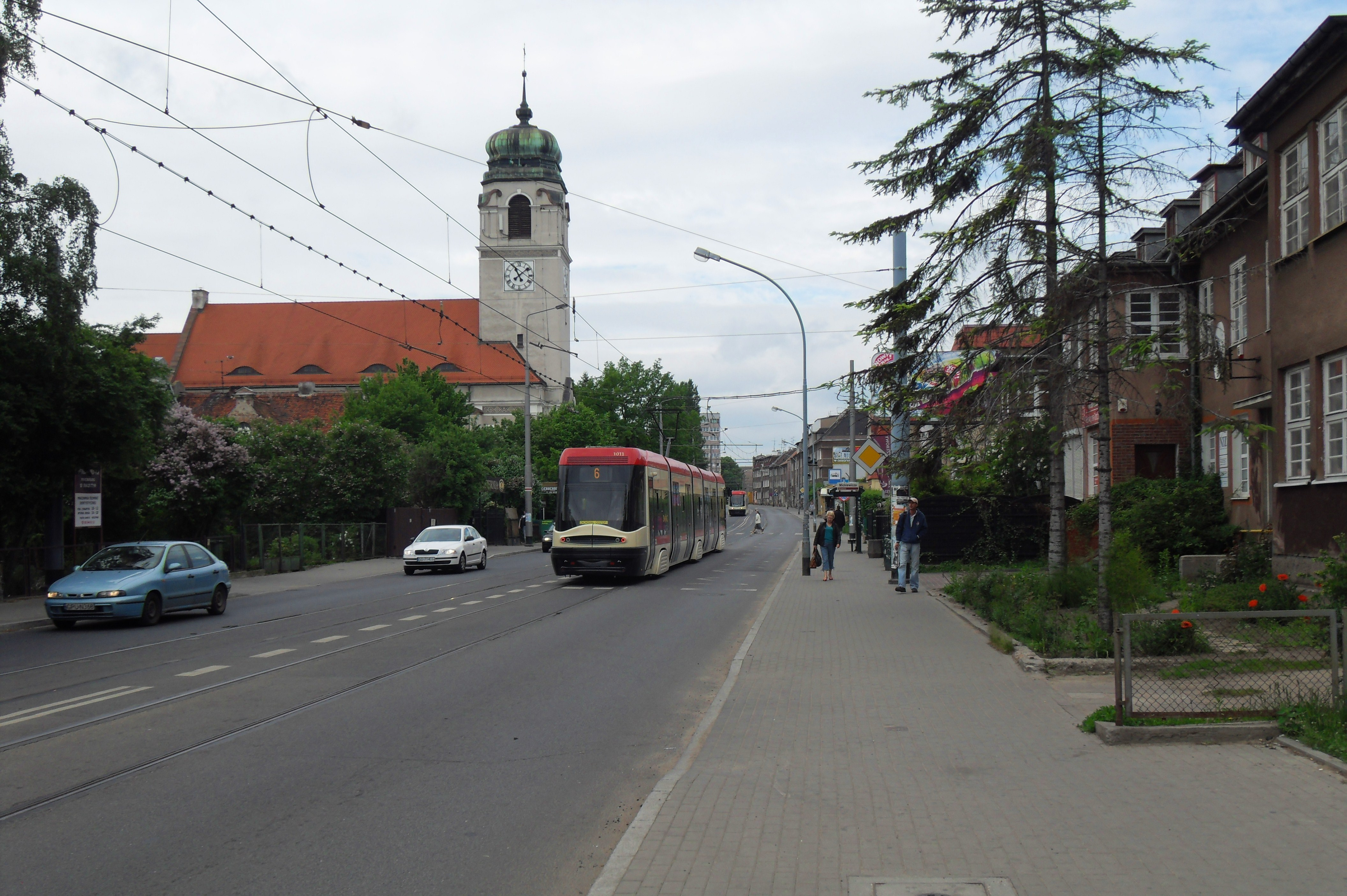
- Wrzeszcz Dolny (Nowe Szkoty)

- Location of Wrzeszcz Dolny within Gdańsk
- Coordinates: 54°23′16″N 18°37′07″E
- Country: Poland
- Voivodeship: Pomeranian
- County/City: Gdańsk
- Established: 2010

Area
  - Total: 3.5 km^{2} (1.4 sq mi)
- Elevation: 24 m (79 ft)

Population (2019)
  - Total: 22,823
  - Density: 6,500/km^{2} (17,000/sq mi)
- Time zone: UTC+1 (CET)
  - Summer (DST): UTC+2 (CEST)
- Area code: +48 58

Wrzeszcz Dolny (translated Lower Wrzeszcz) is an administrative district (dzielnica administracyjna) of the city of Gdańsk, Poland. It was created in 2010 by division of the district Wrzeszcz in two districts.

== History ==
In October 2010, some administrative districts of Gdańsk with a population of more than 50,000 had been divided in smaller districts. Wrzeszcz has been divided in Wrzeszcz Dolny and Wrzeszcz Górny.

== Location ==
The district is the north-eastern and younger part of Wrzeszcz. The division was made along the railway line.

From the north, the district is bordered by the districts of Zaspa-Rozstaje and Brzeźno, from the east by Letnica and Młyniska, from the south by Aniołki and from the west by Wrzeszcz Górny and Zaspa-Młyniec.

Quarters of Wrzeszcz Dolny are:

- Kolonia
- Kuźniczki
- Nowe Szkoty
- Polenhof

== Points of interest ==
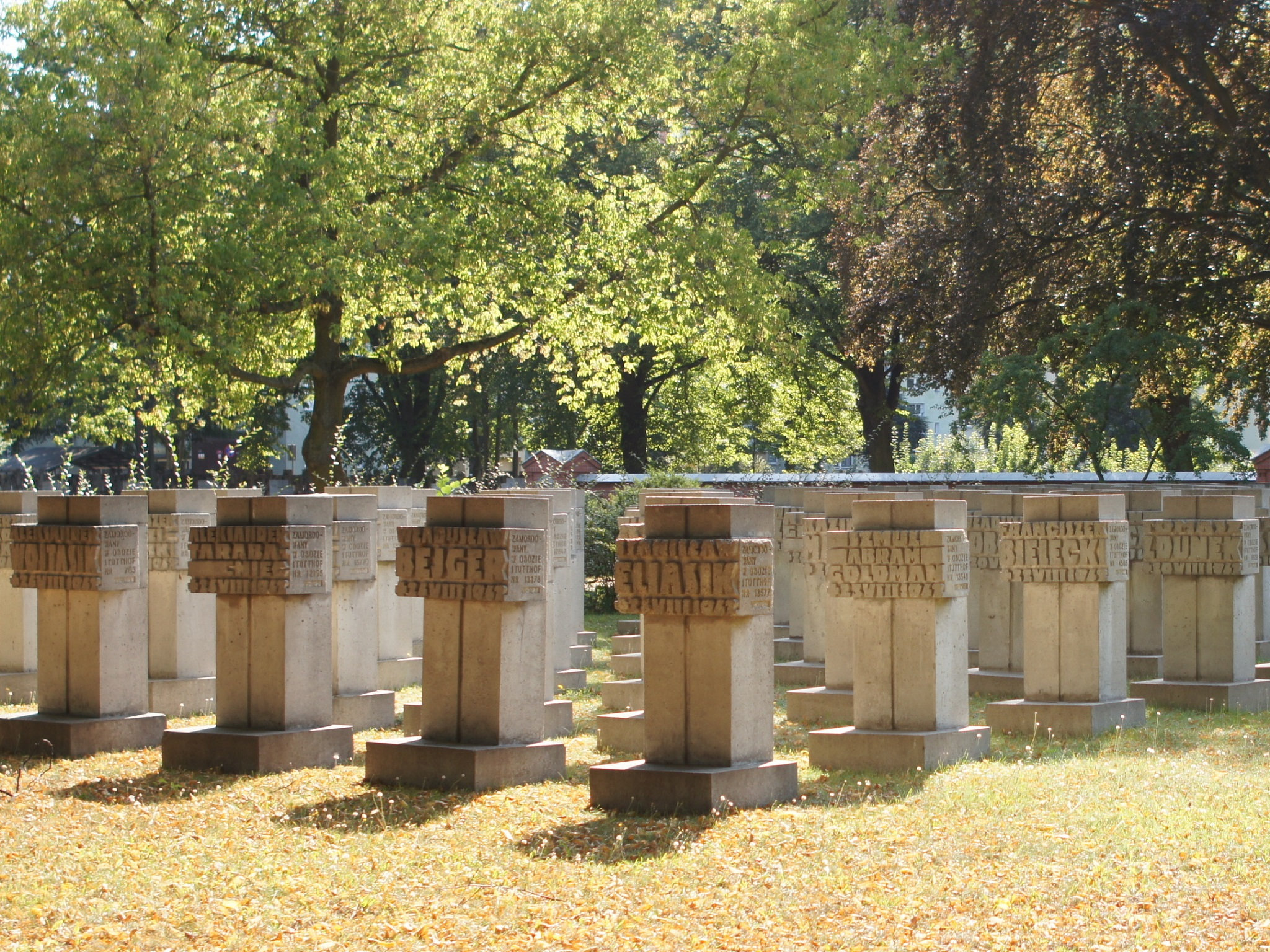
Cemetery near Zaspa

- Gdańsk Wrzeszcz railway station
- Old brewery
- Park Kuźniczki
- Park nad Strzyżą
- Cemetery near Zaspa (Cmentarz na Zaspie - Cmentarz Ofiar Hitleryzmu)

== Notable residents ==
- Günter Grass (1927―2015), German novelist, poet, playwright, illustrator, graphic artist, sculptor, and recipient of the 1999 Nobel Prize in Literature
- Jacek Szafranowicz (1983― ), Polish poet
