= Letnica, Gdańsk =

Letnica
- District (dzielnica)
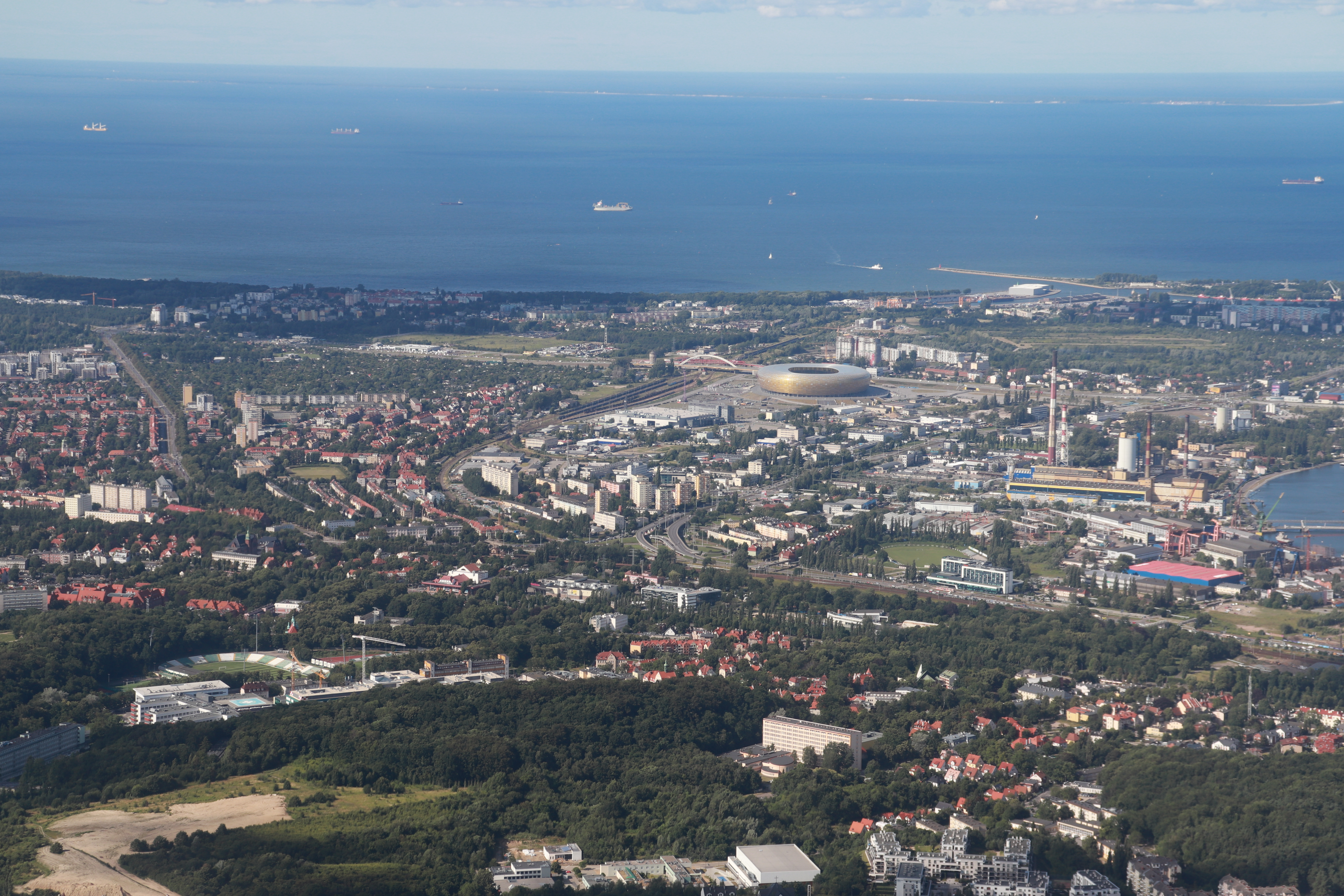
- Aerial view of the north-central part of Gdańsk with Letnica in the middle

- Location of Letnica within Gdańsk
- Coordinates: 54°23′24″N 18°38′25″E
- Country: Poland
- Voivodeship: Pomeranian
- County/City: Gdańsk
- Within city limits: 1914

Area
  - Total: 3.89 km^{2} (1.50 sq mi)

Population (2019)
  - Total: 1,462
  - Density: 376/km^{2} (973/sq mi)
- Time zone: UTC+1 (CET)
  - Summer (DST): UTC+2 (CEST)
- Vehicle registration: GD

Letnica (Kashubian: Latnica; German: Lauental) is an industrial district of the city of Gdańsk in northern Poland. It lies in the northern part of the city, and is notably home to the Gdańsk Stadium, the city's central stadium.

== Location ==
Letnica is on the shore of the Martwa Wisła, a branch of the Vistula River, with its eastern border running on the river. Administratively, it borders Nowy Port to the north, Brzeźno and Wrzeszcz Dolny to the west, Młyniska to the south and east, and Przeróbka to the east. It is not divided into any distinct quarters (osiedla).

== History ==
Up to the start of the 20th century, Letnica was part of the nearby village of Zaspa, owned by the Oliwa Abbey. It was a small village by the Vistula River; as of 1819, it had 11 inhabitants. It started industrializing in the 19th century, spurring population growth—by 1900, Letnica, known in German as Lauental, had 1,700 inhabitants.

The area remained industrial throughout the 20th century. In 1945, the new communist government of Poland took control of the area, renaming Lautenal to Letniewo, but this was found incompatible with place name formation rules and changed to Letnica in 1949. As industry in the area declined, in 2010, a project began with the goal of revitalizing Letnica. In 2011, the new Gdańsk Stadium was completed in the district, partly succeeding in its goal of changing the local urban fabric. Additionally, housing units were built in the district as well.

== Gallery ==
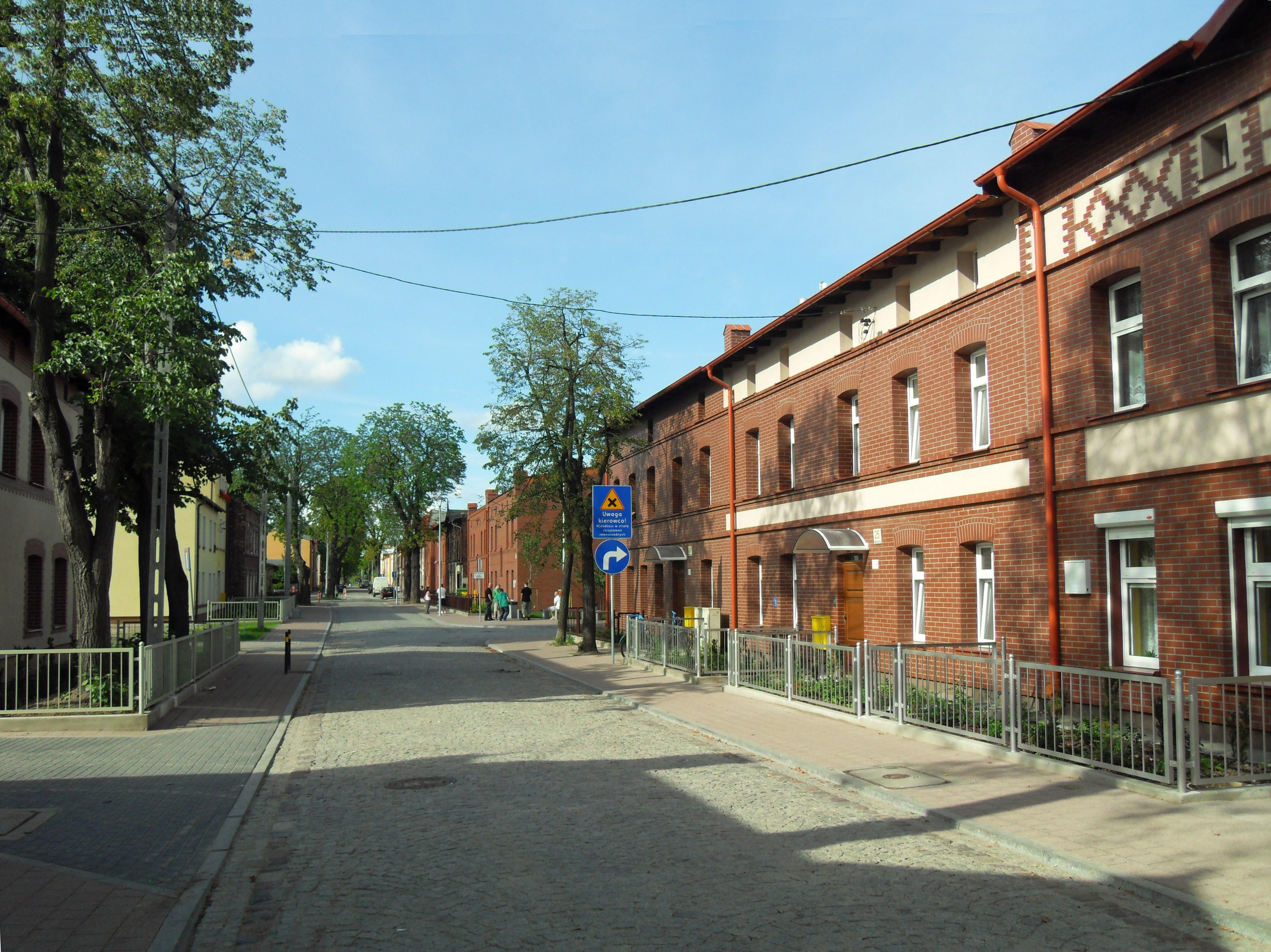
Renovated houses at Starowiejska Street

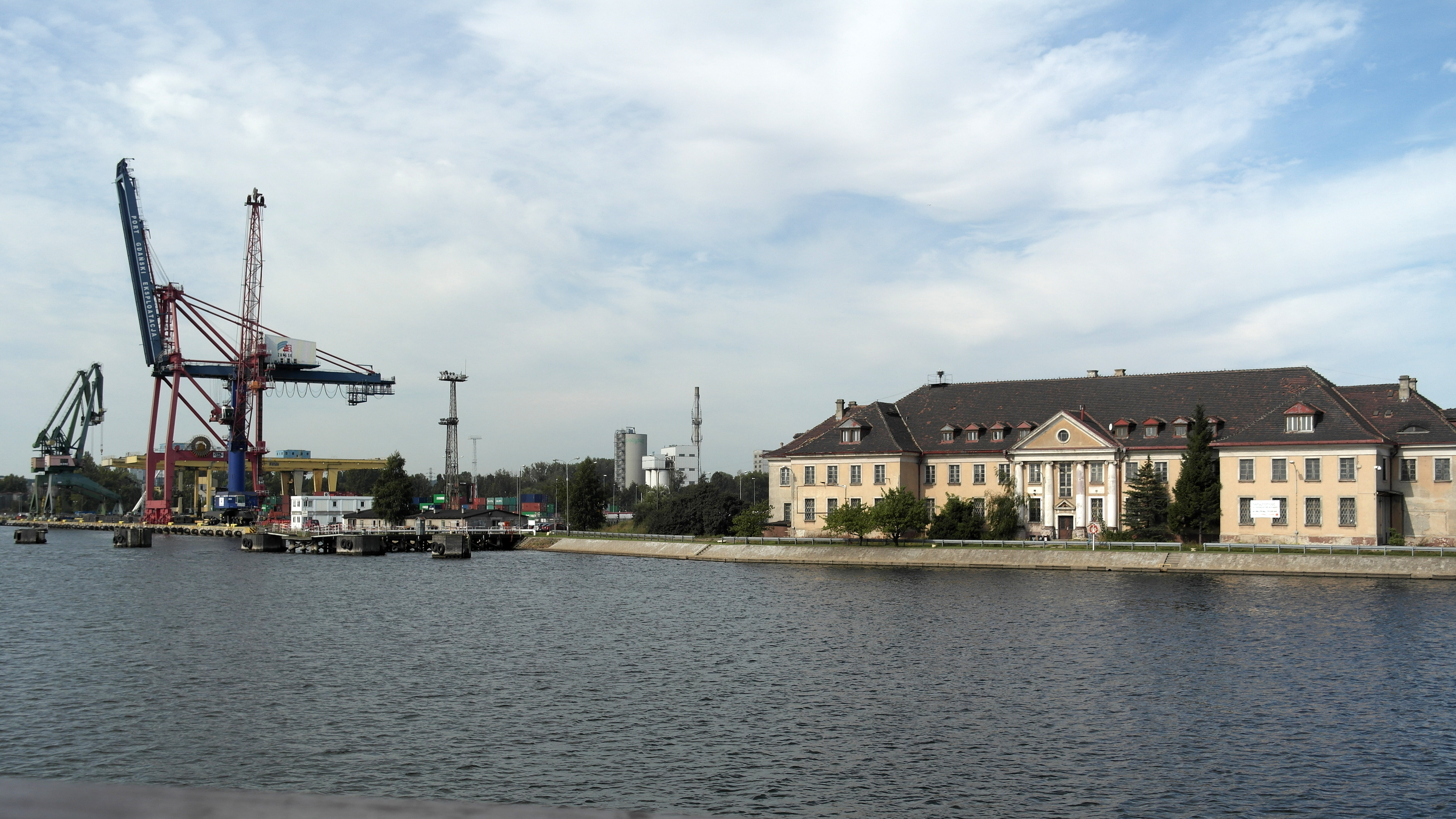
Gdańsk Container Terminal and the pre-war Polish Post Office

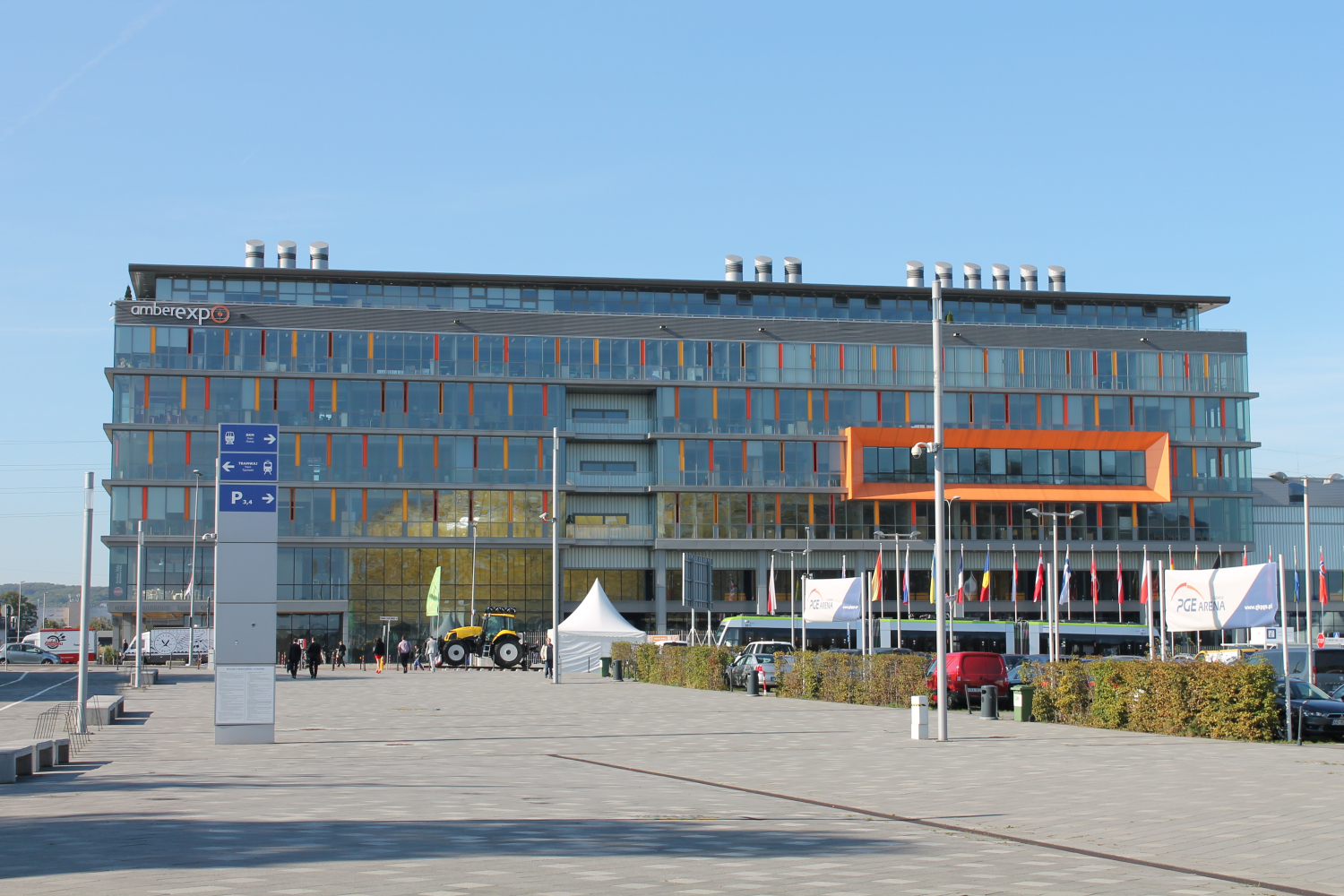
AmberExpo, an exposition building

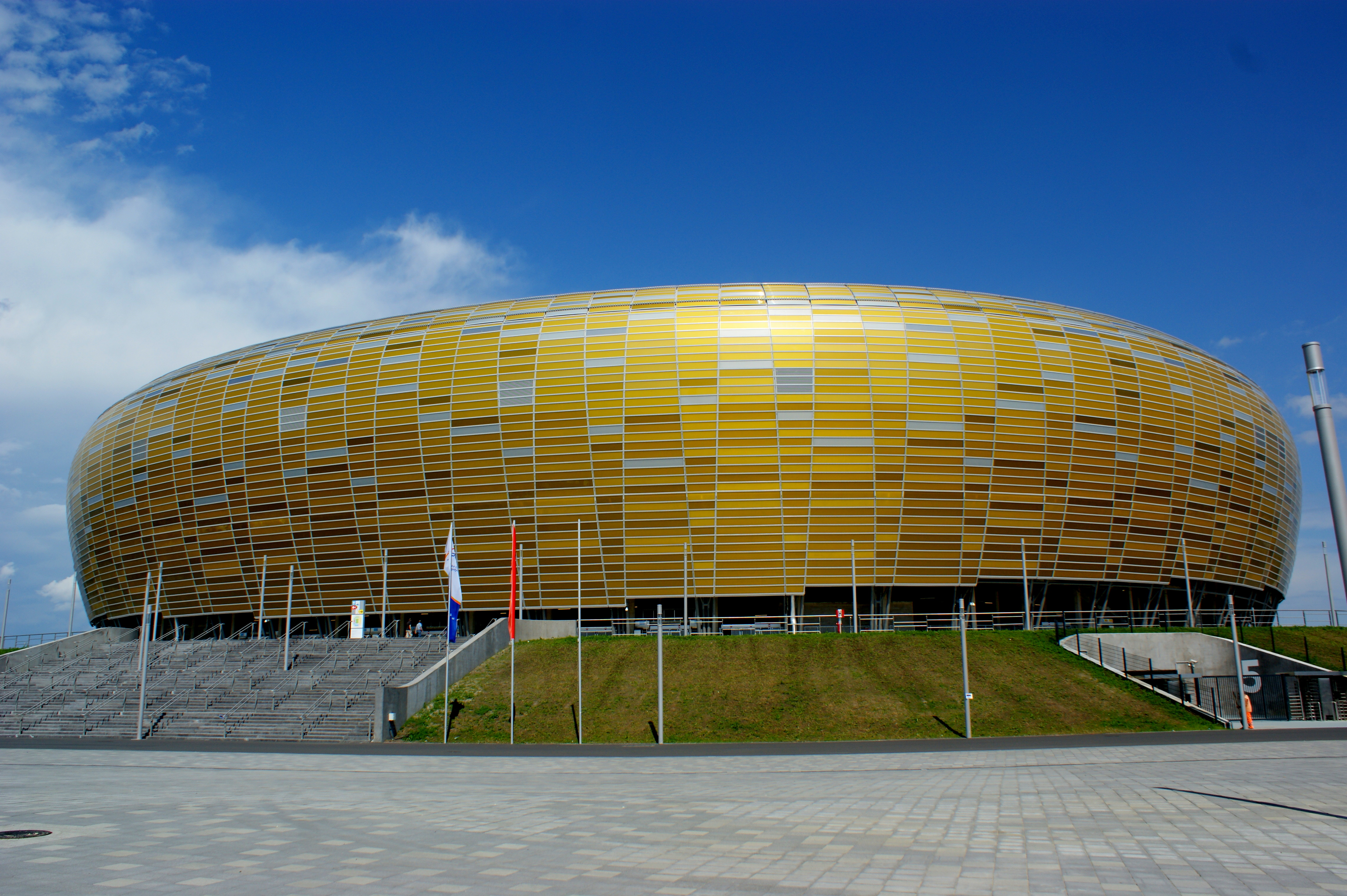
The Gdańsk Stadium

== See also ==
- List of neighbourhoods of Gdańsk
