= Brzeźno Pier =

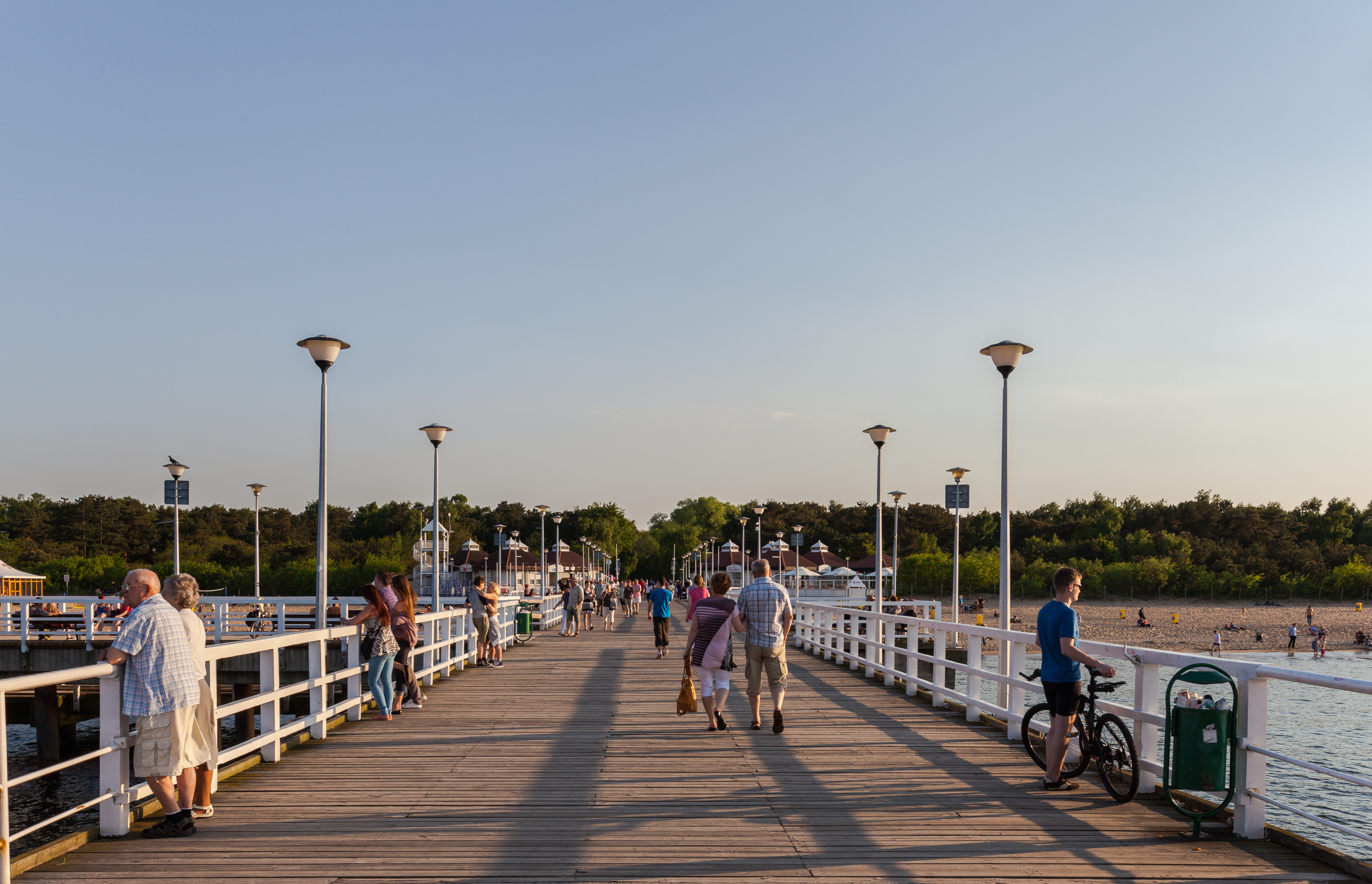
- Brzeźno Pier
- Type: Pleasure Pier
- Coordinates: 54.41°N 18.63°E
- Official name: Molo w Brzeźnie

Characteristics
- Total length: 136 metres (446 ft)

History
- Opening date: 19th century

Brzeźno Pier (Polish: Molo w Brzeżnie) - a pier located in Brzeźno, one of the resort boroughs of Gdańsk, Pomeranian Voivodeship; in Poland. The pier was built in the second half of the nineteenth century, with a length of 100 metres. The pier was later expanded after World War II and currently has a length of 136 metres and a width of 7.2 metres.
