= Zaspa-Rozstaje =

District of Gdańsk, Poland

Coordinates: 54.3667°N 18.6333°E

- District (dzielnica)
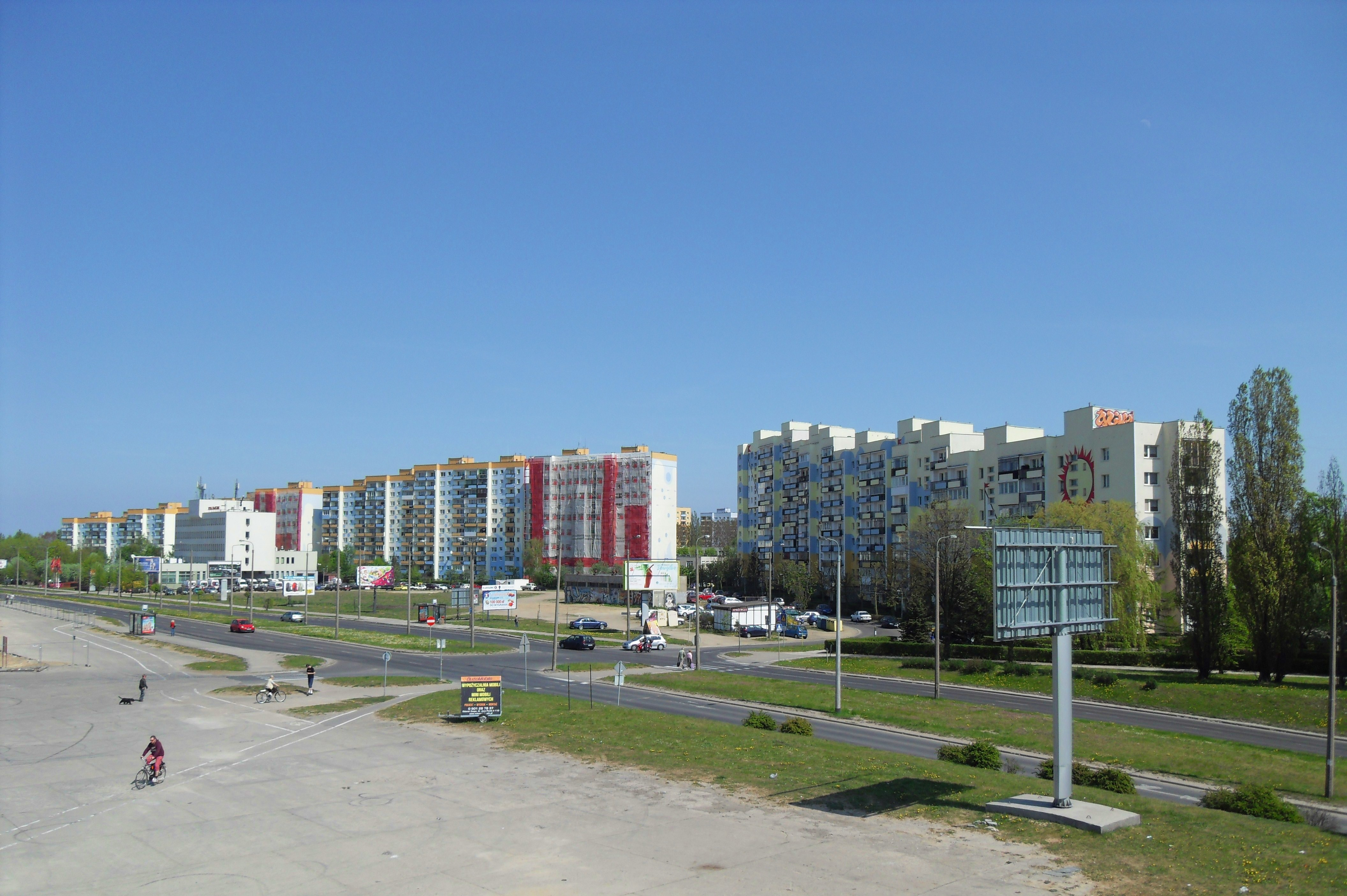
- Zaspa-Rozstaje with a part of the former runway in the foreground

- Location of Zaspa-Rozstaje within Gdańsk
- Country: Poland
- Voivodeship: Pomeranian
- City: Gdańsk

Area
  - Total: 2.08 km^{2} (0.80 sq mi)

Population
  - Total: 12,446
  - Density: 5,980/km^{2} (15,500/sq mi)

Zaspa-Rozstaje is one of the administrative districts of the city of Gdańsk, Poland. It was separated from the district of Zaspa alongside Zaspa-Młyniec in 1990.

== Location ==
Zaspa-Rozstaje borders Przymorze Wielkie to the north, Brzeźno to the north and east, Wrzeszcz Dolny to the south and east, and Zaspa-Młyniec to the west. It is not divided into any quarters (osiedla).

== History ==
For the broader history of the area which this is in, which goes into deeper detail regarding its past, see Zaspa § History. Rozstaje, known in German as Eckhof, was initially a small manor house in Zaspa which was part of the village. As of 1905, it had 10 inhabitants, and became part of the city of Danzig in 1914. The current area known as Zaspa-Rozstaje was developed in the 1970s, on the grounds of a former airport, and became a separate district in 1990.

== Gallery ==
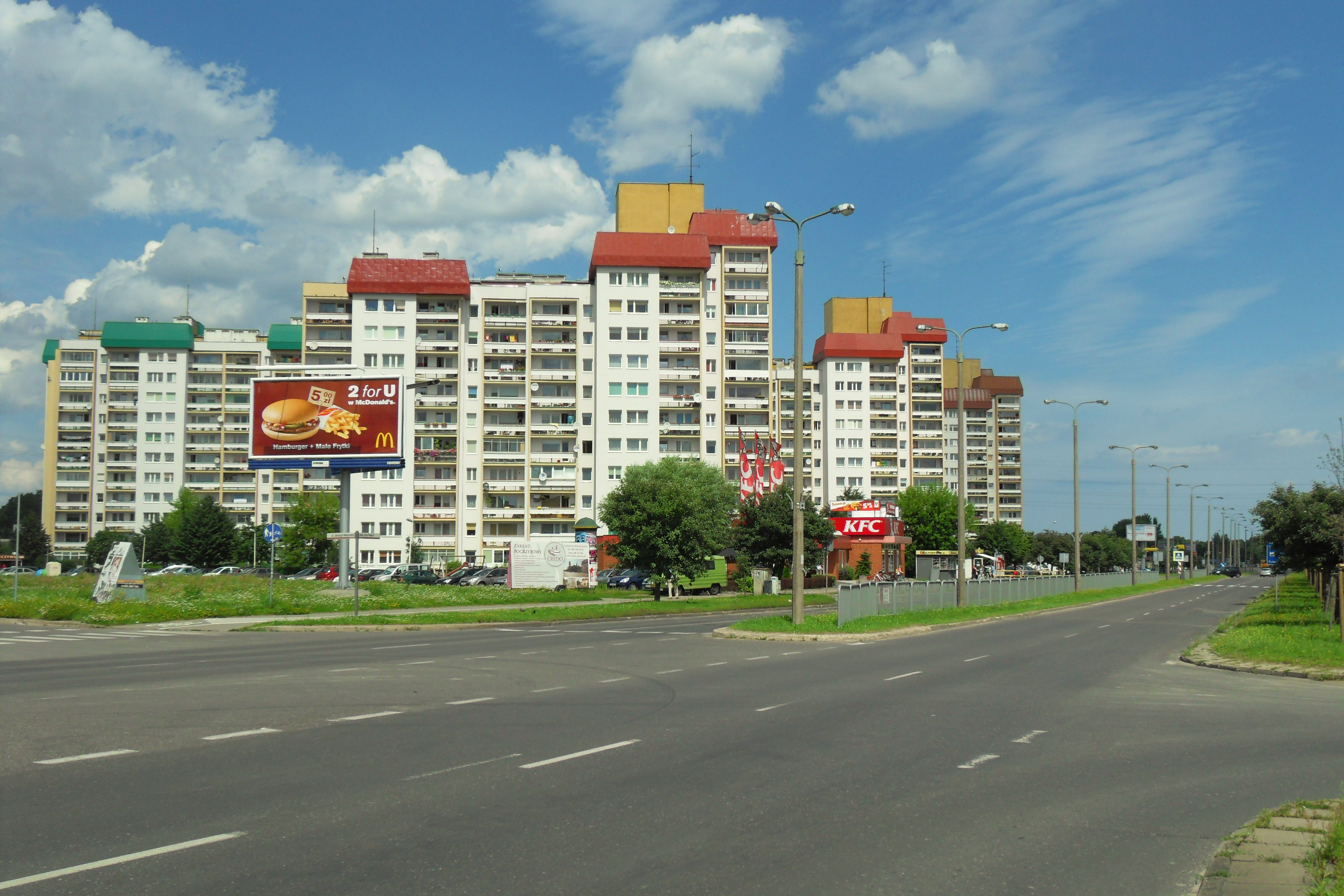
Large apartment blocks on al. Jana Pawła II, the central street

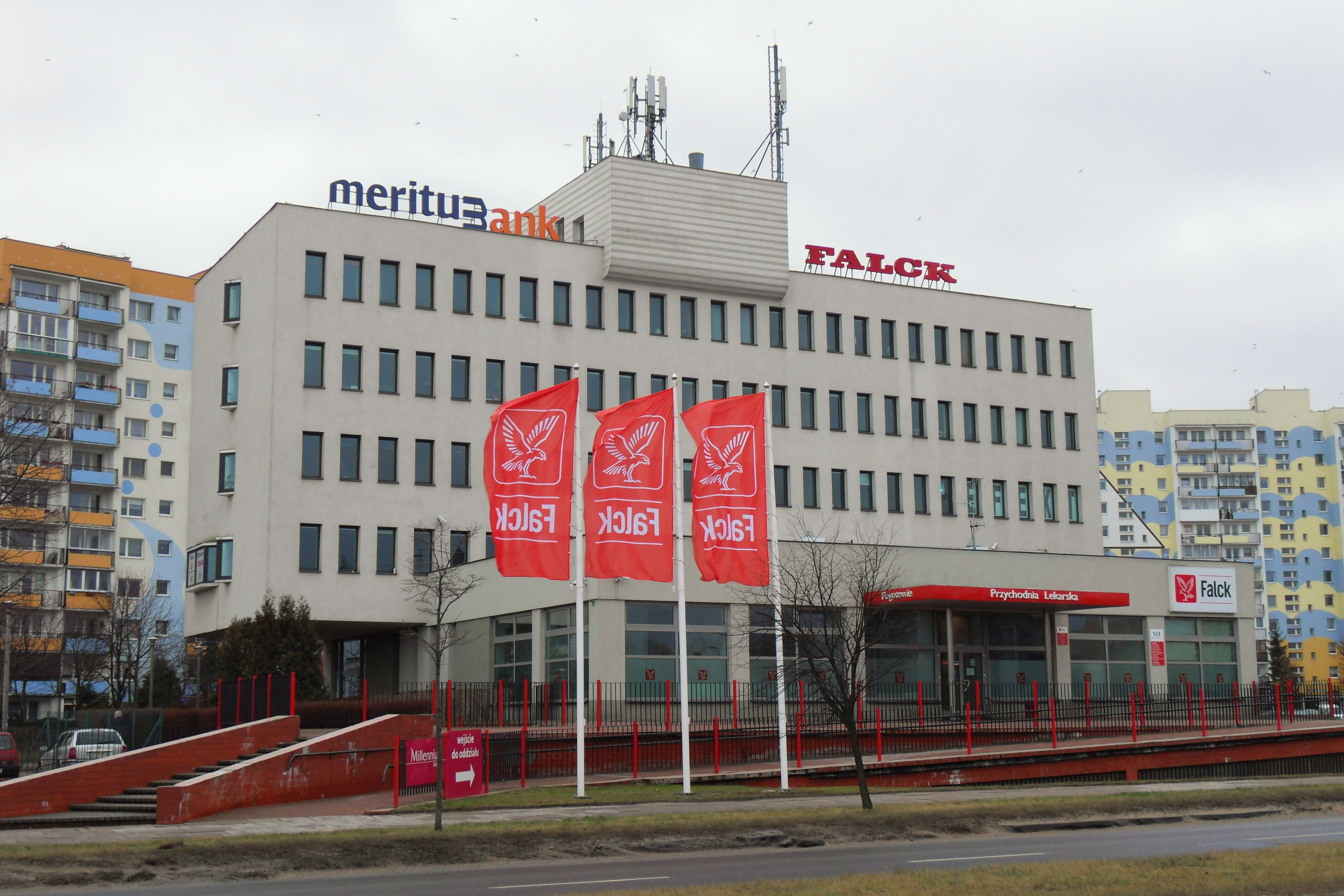
A medical clinic

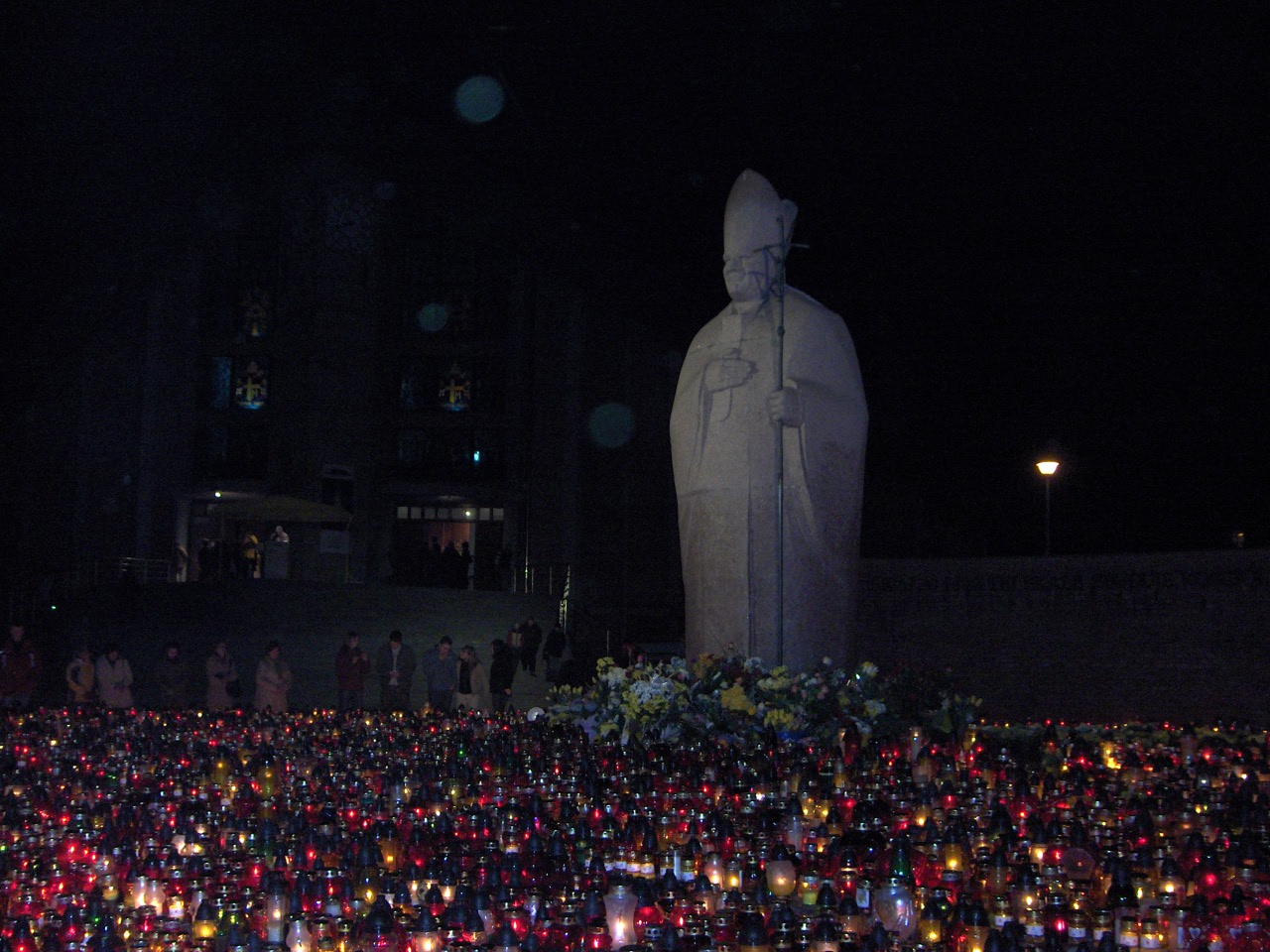
John Paul II monument

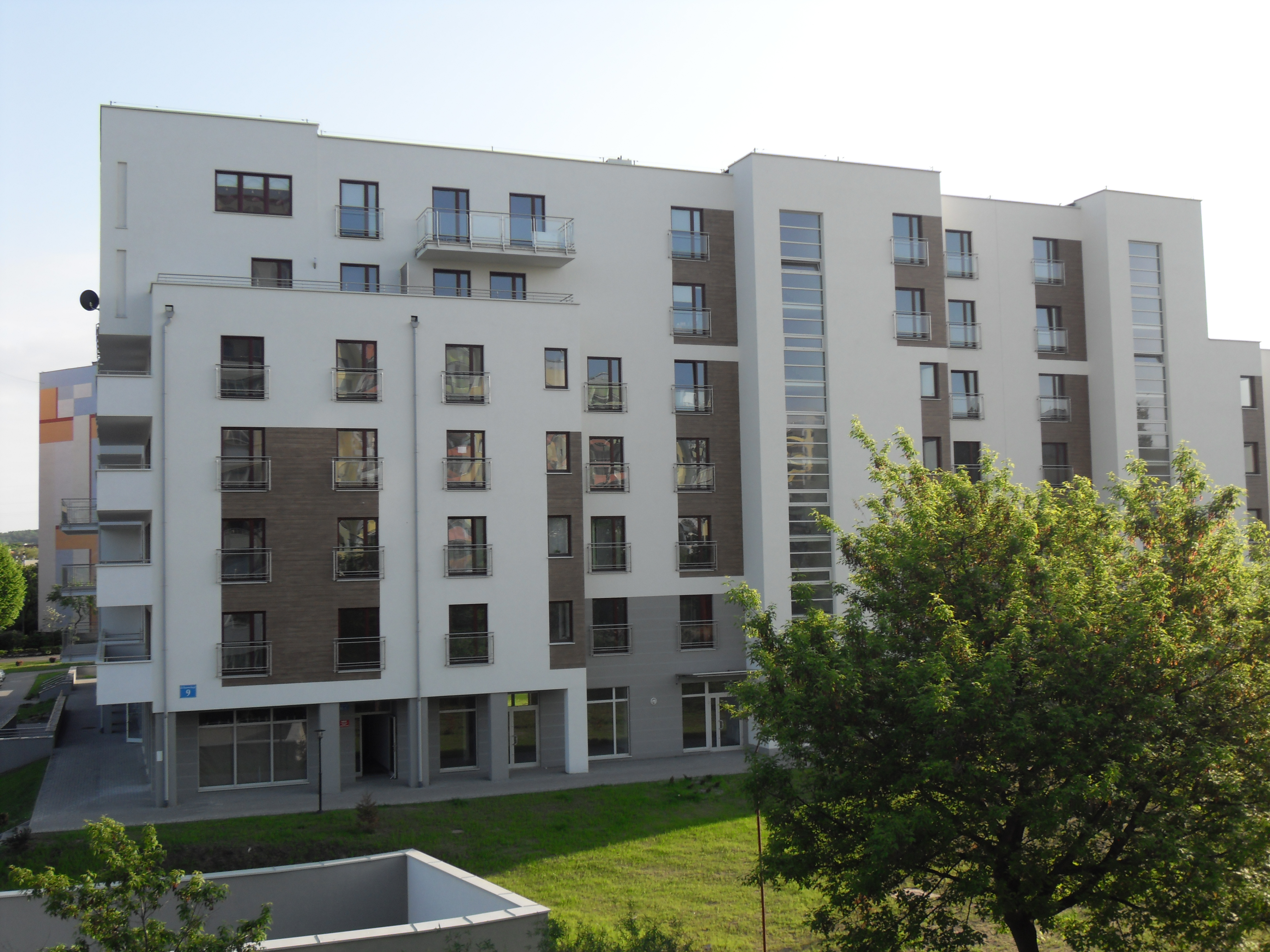
Modern apartment buildings
