= Zaspa-Młyniec =

District of Gdańsk, Poland

Coordinates: 54.3667°N 18.6333°E

- District (dzielnica)
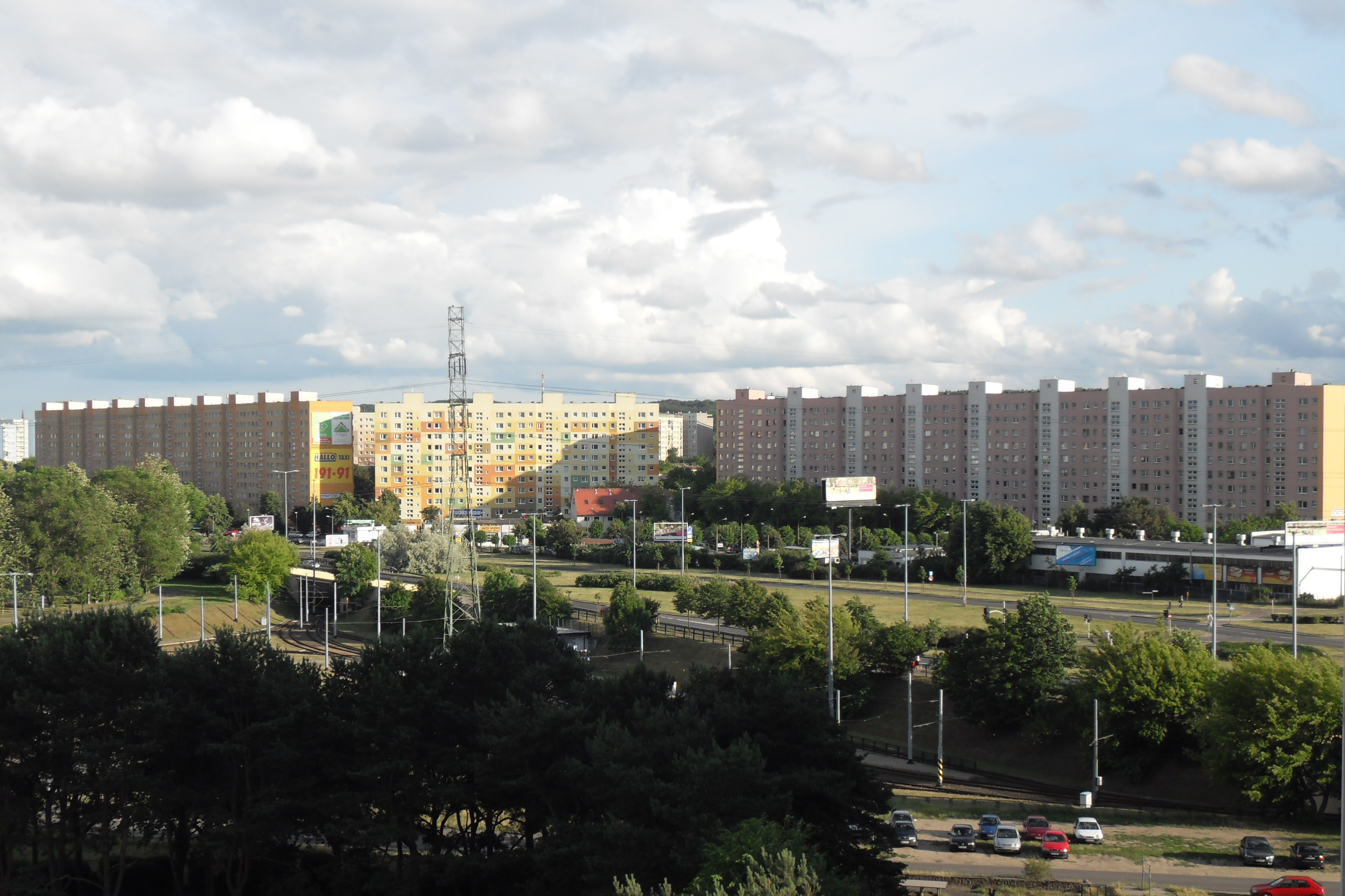
- Młyniec, as viewed from Przymorze Wielkie

- Location of Zaspa-Młyniec within Gdańsk
- Country: Poland
- Voivodeship: Pomeranian
- City: Gdańsk

Area
  - Total: 1.22 km^{2} (0.47 sq mi)

Population
  - Total: 12,376
  - Density: 10,100/km^{2} (26,300/sq mi)

Zaspa-Młyniec is one of the administrative districts of the city of Gdańsk, Poland. It is one of the two districts that comprise the area of Zaspa, having been split off from the district alongside Zaspa-Rozstaje in 1990.

== Location ==
Zaspa-Młyniec borders Przymorze Małe to the north, Zaspa-Rozstaje to the east, Wrzeszcz Dolny and Wrzeszcz Górny to the south, and Strzyża, as well as Oliwa, to the west. It is divided into the quarters (osiedla) of Młyniec A and Młyniec B.

== History ==
The history of Zaspa, and thus Zaspa-Młyniec, can be found at Zaspa § History; the village of Młyniec, known in German as Mühlenhof, was first mentioned in 1734 and was a small settlement centered around a mill for much of its recorded existence, becoming part of Oliwa in 1864. It entered the city boundaries Gdańsk in 1926 as a part of Oliwa. It was developed in the 1970s, after an airport that operated in Zaspa had shut down, as part of the district of Zaspa. In 1990, it was separated into its own district. The current district does not cover the entirety of the former borders of Młyniec.

== Gallery ==
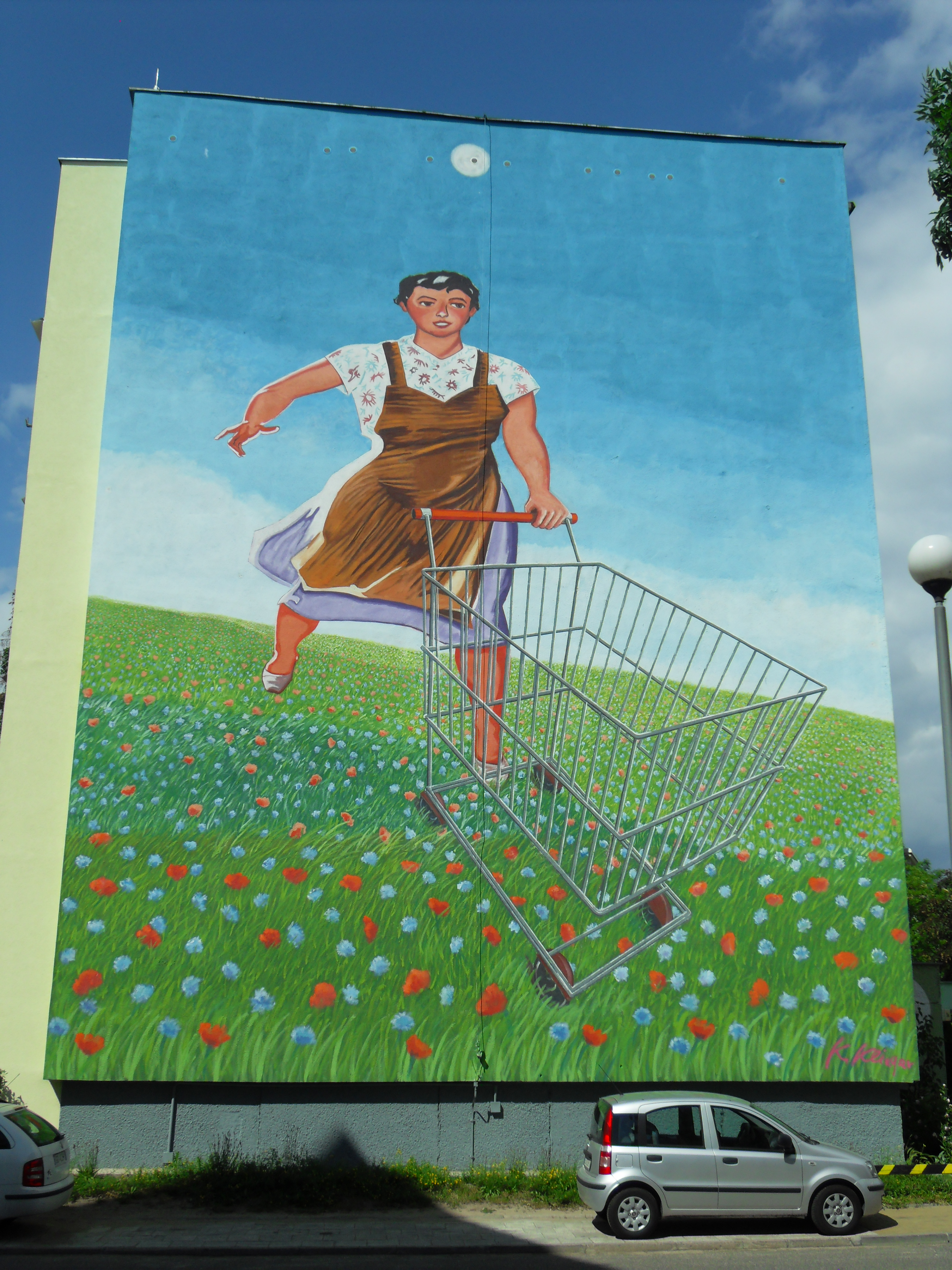
An example of a local mural

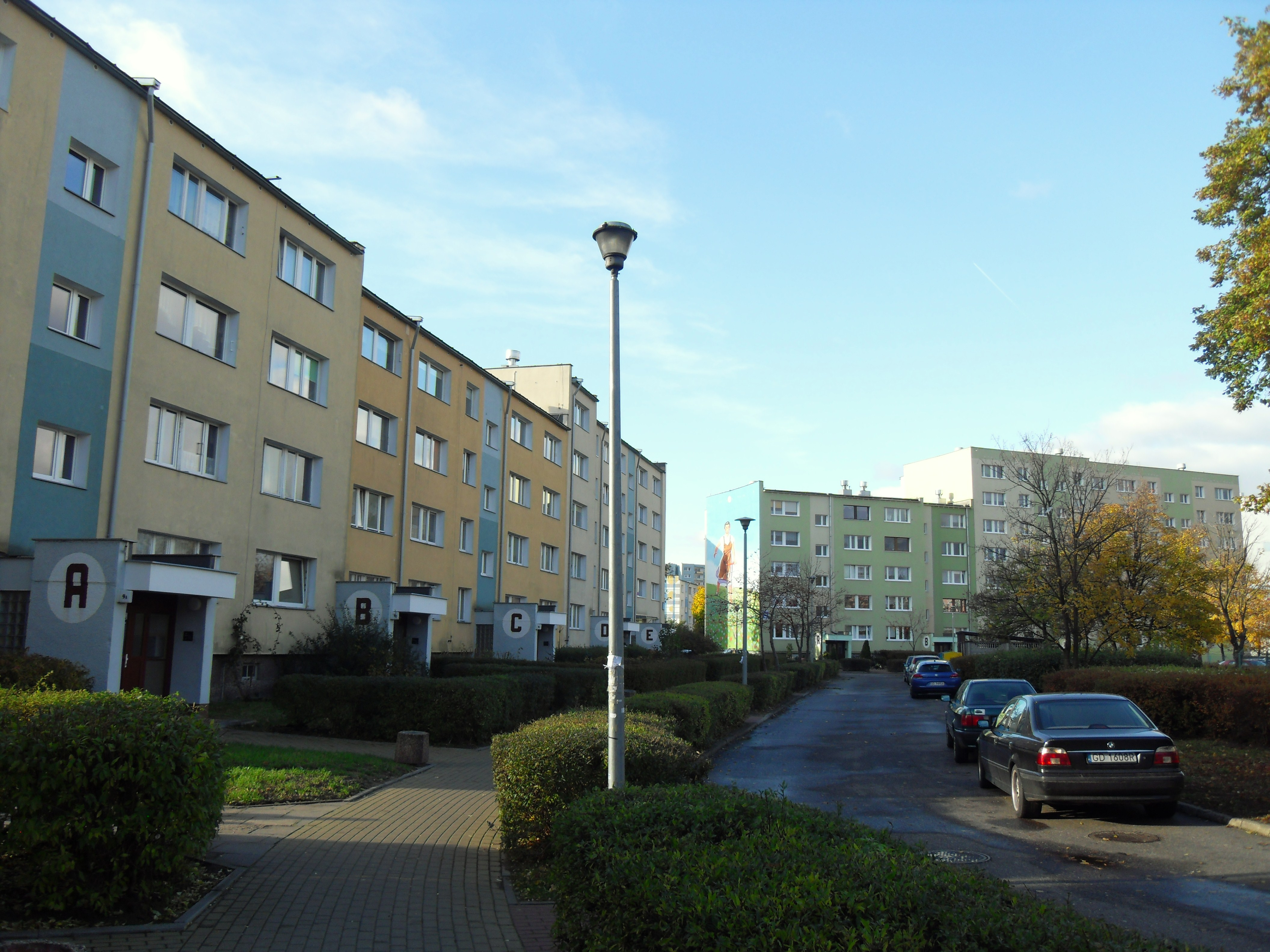
Block housing

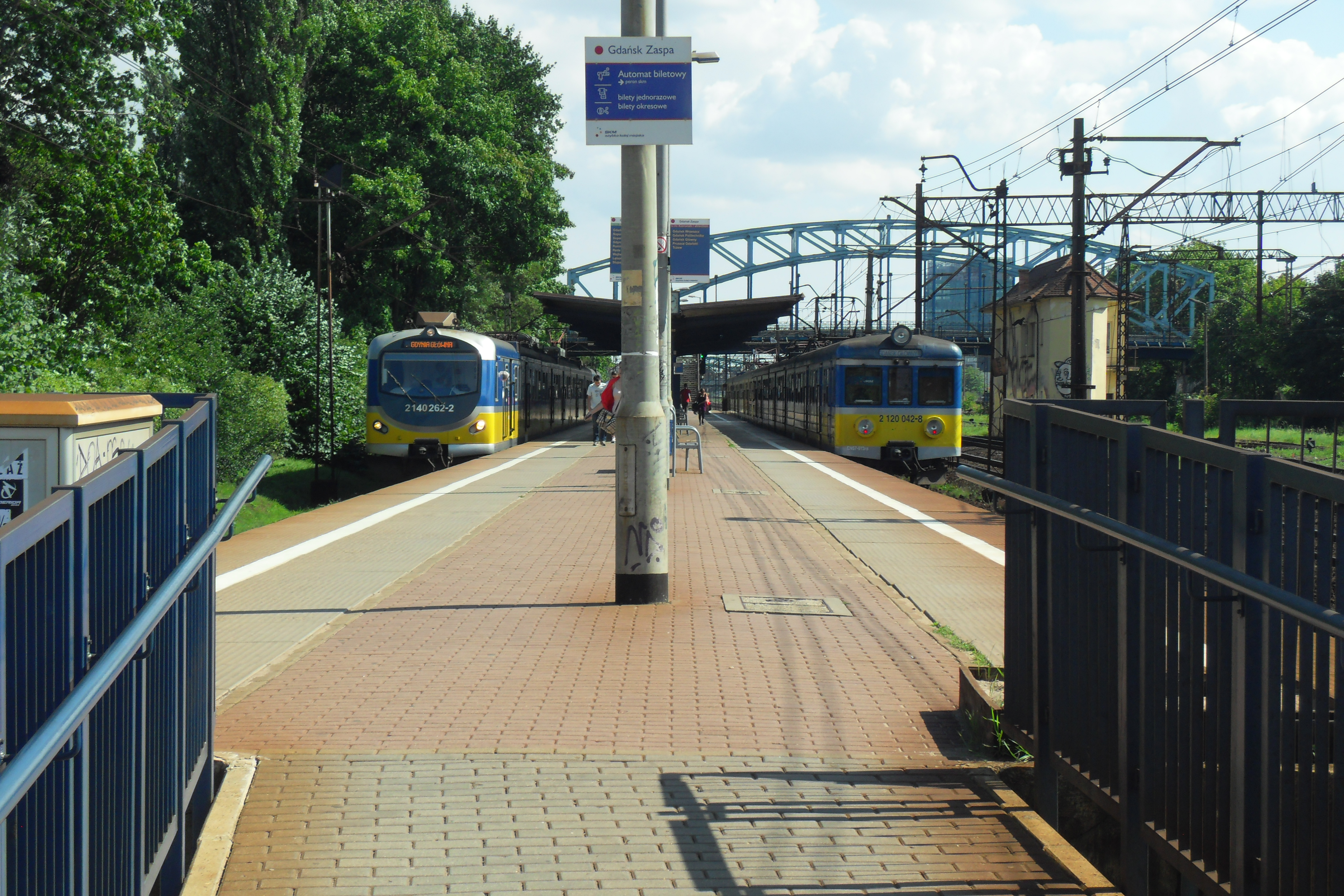
Gdańsk Zaspa railway station

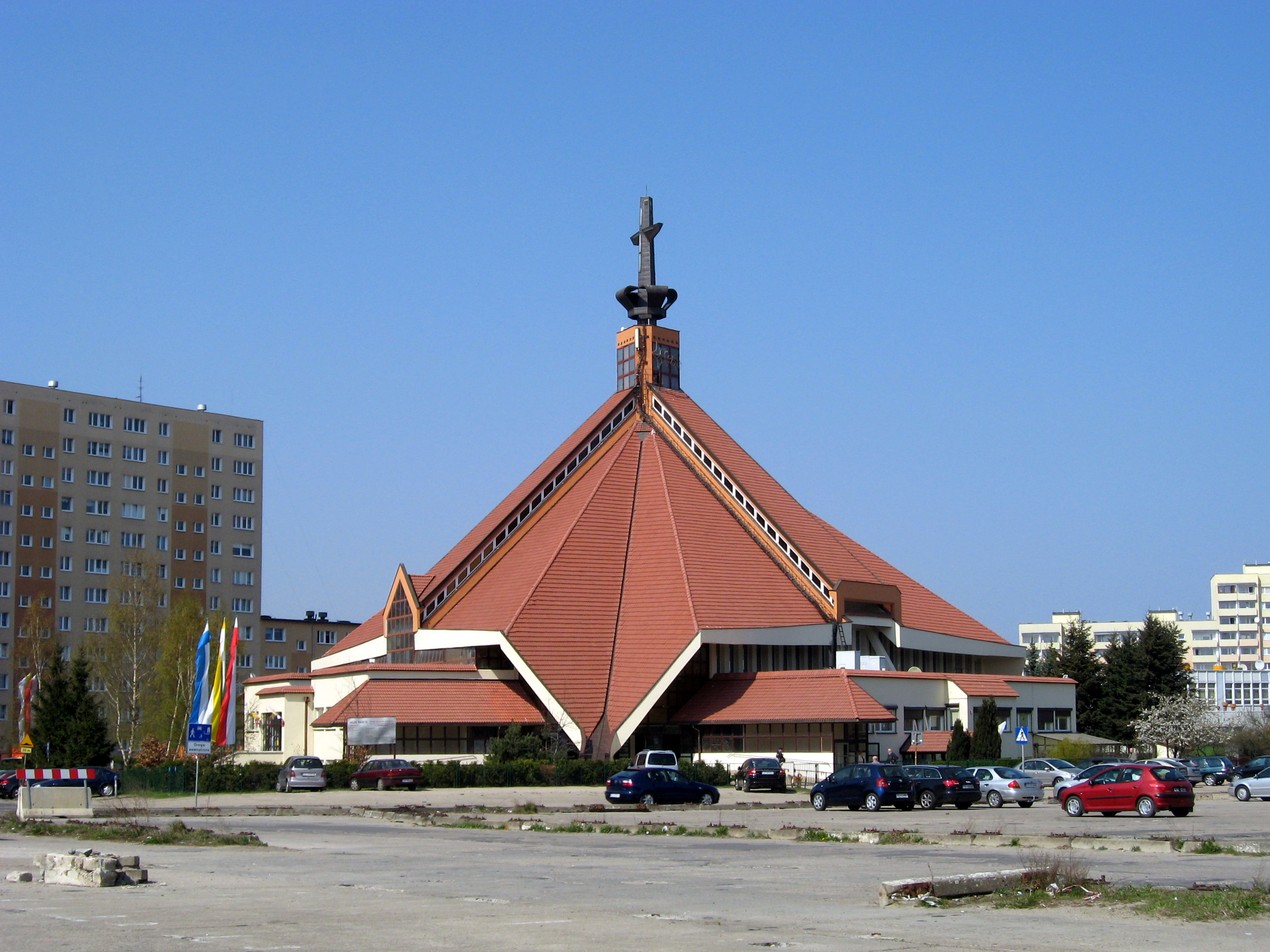
St. Casimir's Church, a notable local church

== See also ==
- Zaspa
- Zaspa-Rozstaje
