= Młyniska =

Młyniska Schellmühl, Szelmeja
- District (dzielnica)
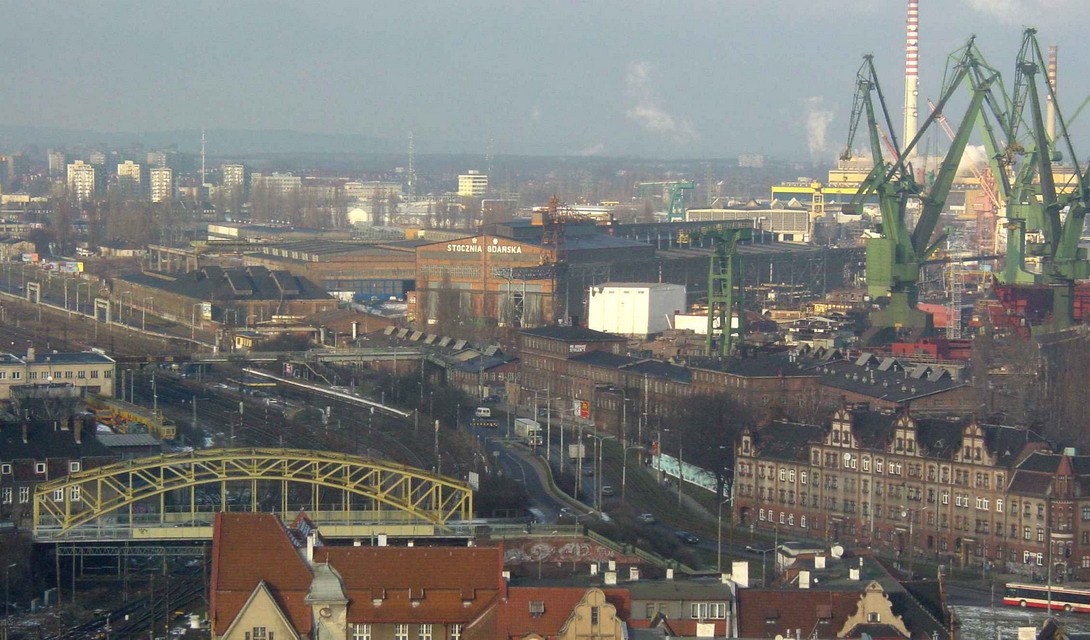
- View of Młyniska from Śródmieście

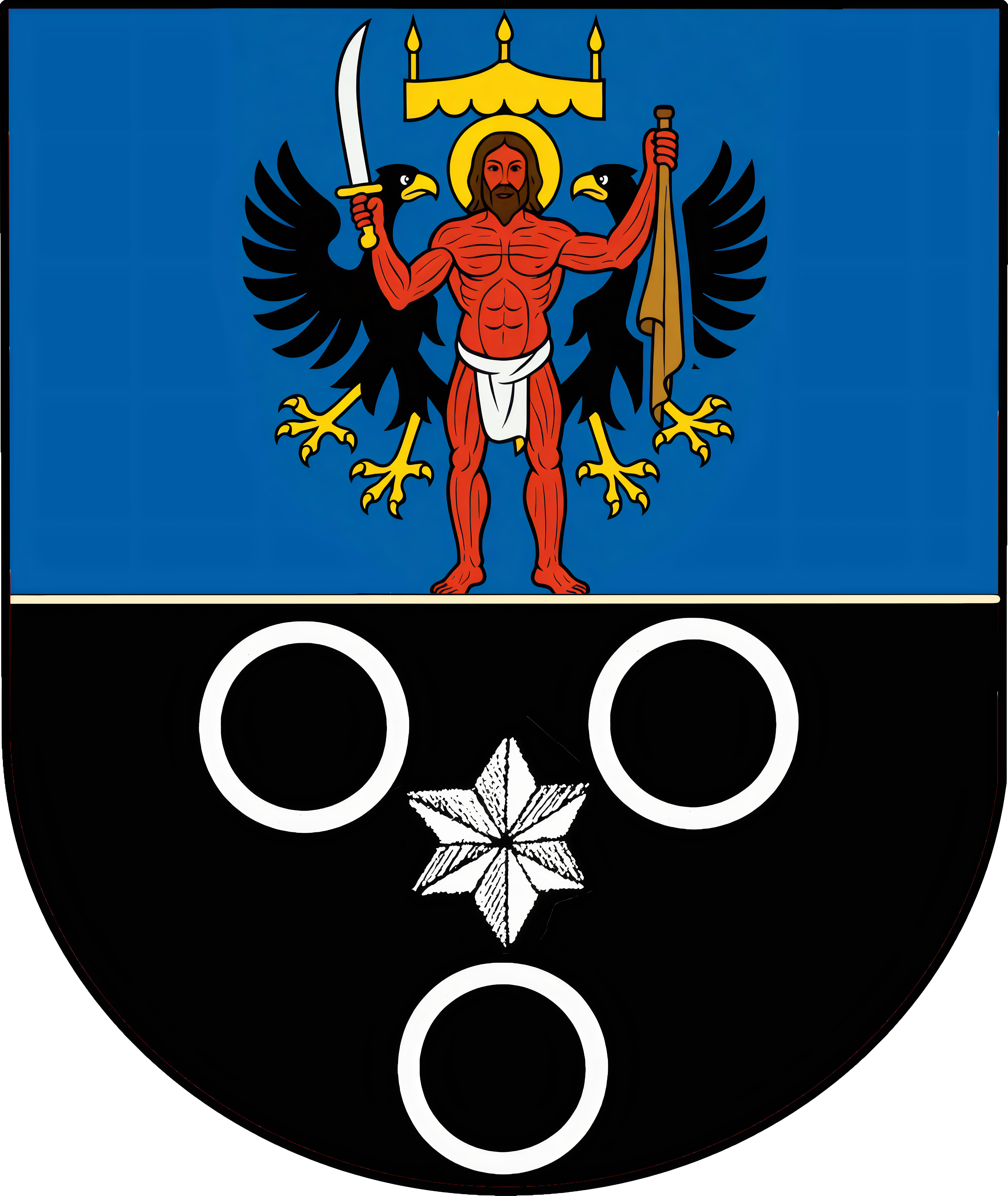
- Flag [of arms]

- Location of Młyniska within Gdańsk

- Location within Pomeranian Voivodeship
- Coordinates: 54°22′20″N 18°38′49″E
- Country: Poland
- Voivodeship: Pomeranian
- City: Gdańsk
- Established: 1380
- Founder: Winrich von Kniprode
- Named for: Jacob Schellen

Government
  - Body: District Board
  - Chairman of the District Board: Joanna Grzenia
  - Chairman of the District Council: Tomasz Larczyński

Area
  - Total: 4.32 km^{2} (1.67 sq mi)
- Highest elevation: 5.9 m (19 ft)
- Lowest elevation: 0 m (0 ft)

Population (2016)
  - Total: 2,879
  - Density: 666/km^{2} (1,730/sq mi)

Młyniska (German: Schellmühl) is one of the districts of the city of Gdańsk, Poland. It is predominantly industrial.

== Location ==
A significant amount of land in Młyniska is covered by the Martwa Wisła and the Kashubian Canal; the latter physically separates it from Przeróbka. Administratively, it borders Letnica to the north, Przeróbka to the east, Śródmieście to the south, and Aniołki and Wrzeszcz Dolny to the west. It consists of the quarters (osiedla) of Ostrów, Młode Miasto, Składy, and Zielony Trójkąt.

== History ==
Młyniska was, at first, a small village on the shore of the Vistula River. Its name comes from the word młyn, meaning "mill"; a mill was present in the area as far back as the 13th century. From 1283 onward, it was owned by the Oliwa Abbey and rented out to various wealthy families. It was mostly rural and agricultural, with a manor present. The small village that existed there was destroyed during the siege of the city of Danzig in 1734. The manor survived, but was later heavily damaged and repaired starting in the 1990s.

The village was rented by various wealthy families after that. In 1773, the abbey's lands were confiscated by the Prussian government; as of that year, 27 people lived in Młyniska, known as Schellmühle in German. It was partly destroyed in 1807, then fully so in 1813. The population of the area grew in the 19th century, alongside the development of railways, tramways, and industrial buildings. In 1914, it was incorporated into Danzig's city borders.

Industrial development continued in Schellmühle, which, in 1945, was heavily damaged. Although its name was initially translated into Polish as Ślemień, that became Młyniska in 1948 when it was discovered "ślemień" was an old word for "gallows". Since 1960, a cogeneration plant, Gdańsk Power Station, has been operational in Młyniska.

== Gallery ==
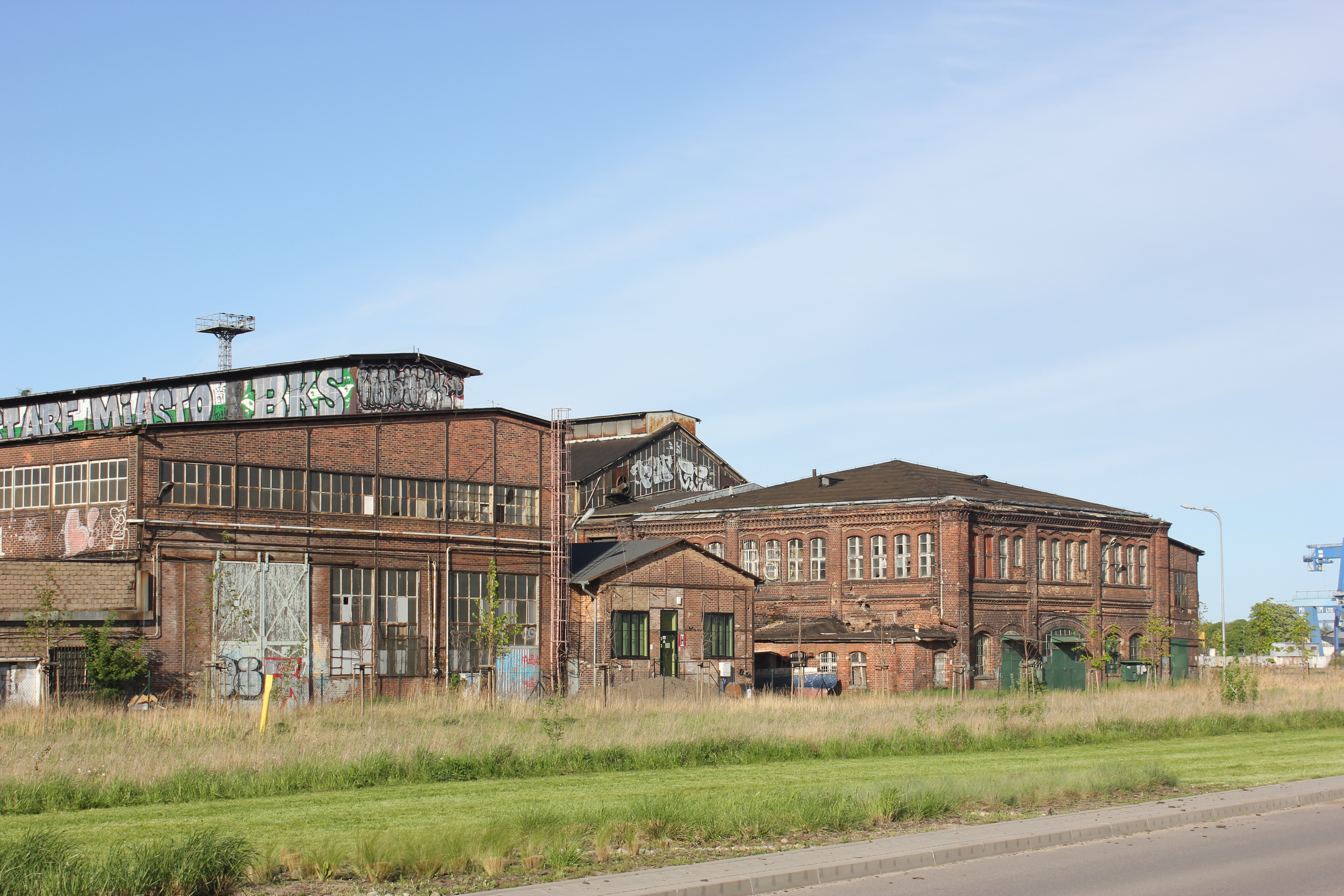
19th and 20th century shipyard buildings

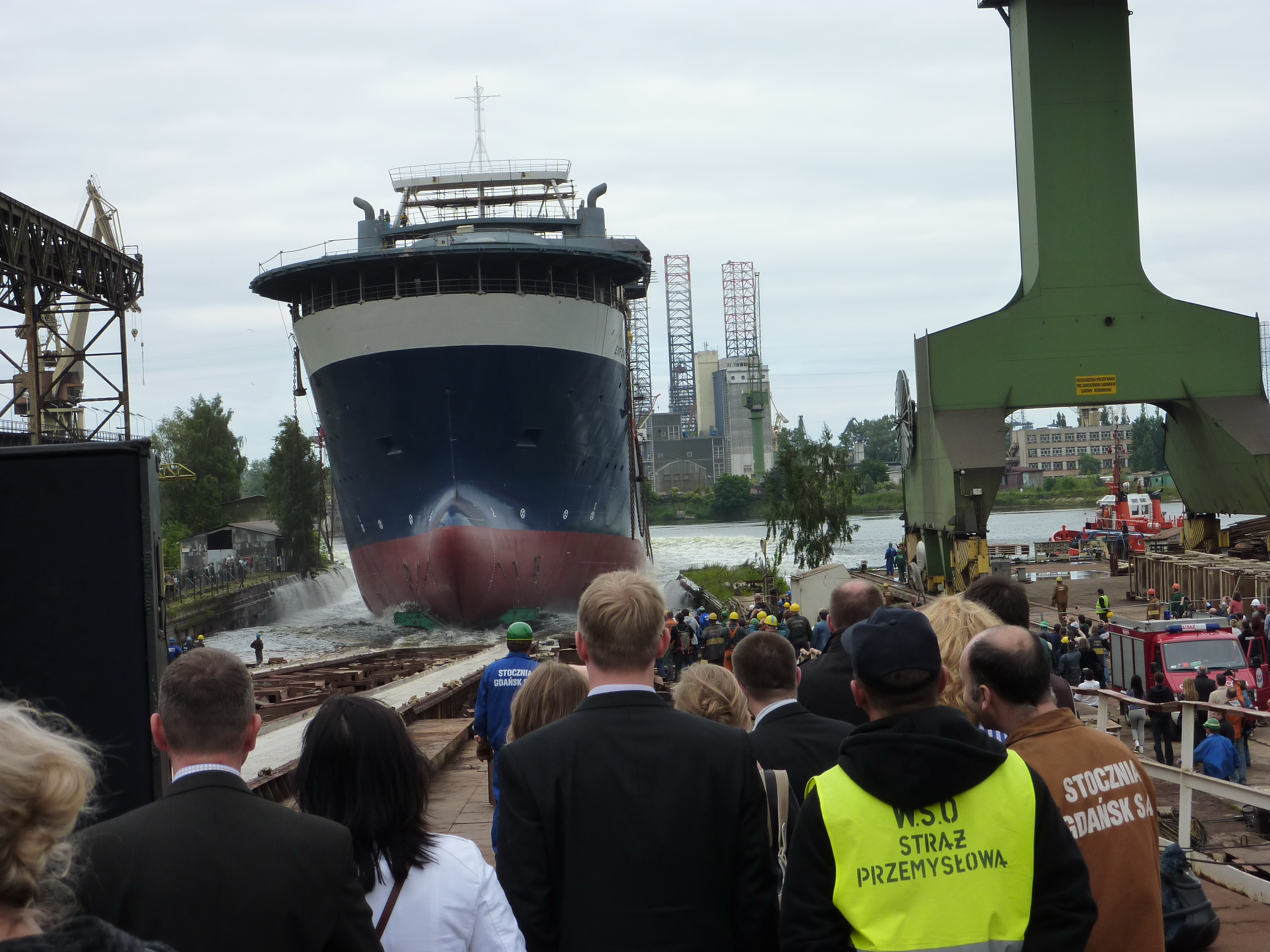
The launching of a ship

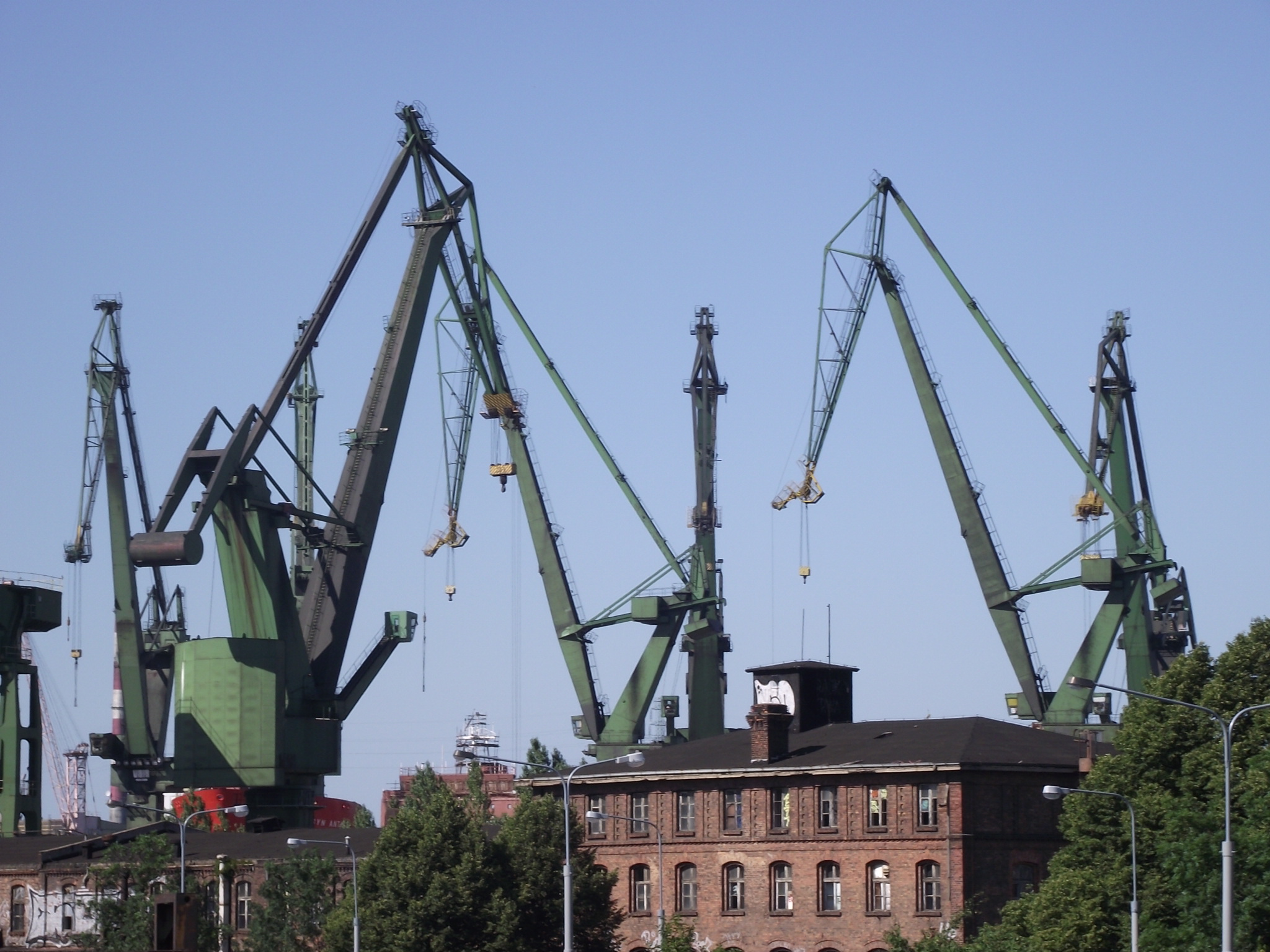
Level luffing cranes

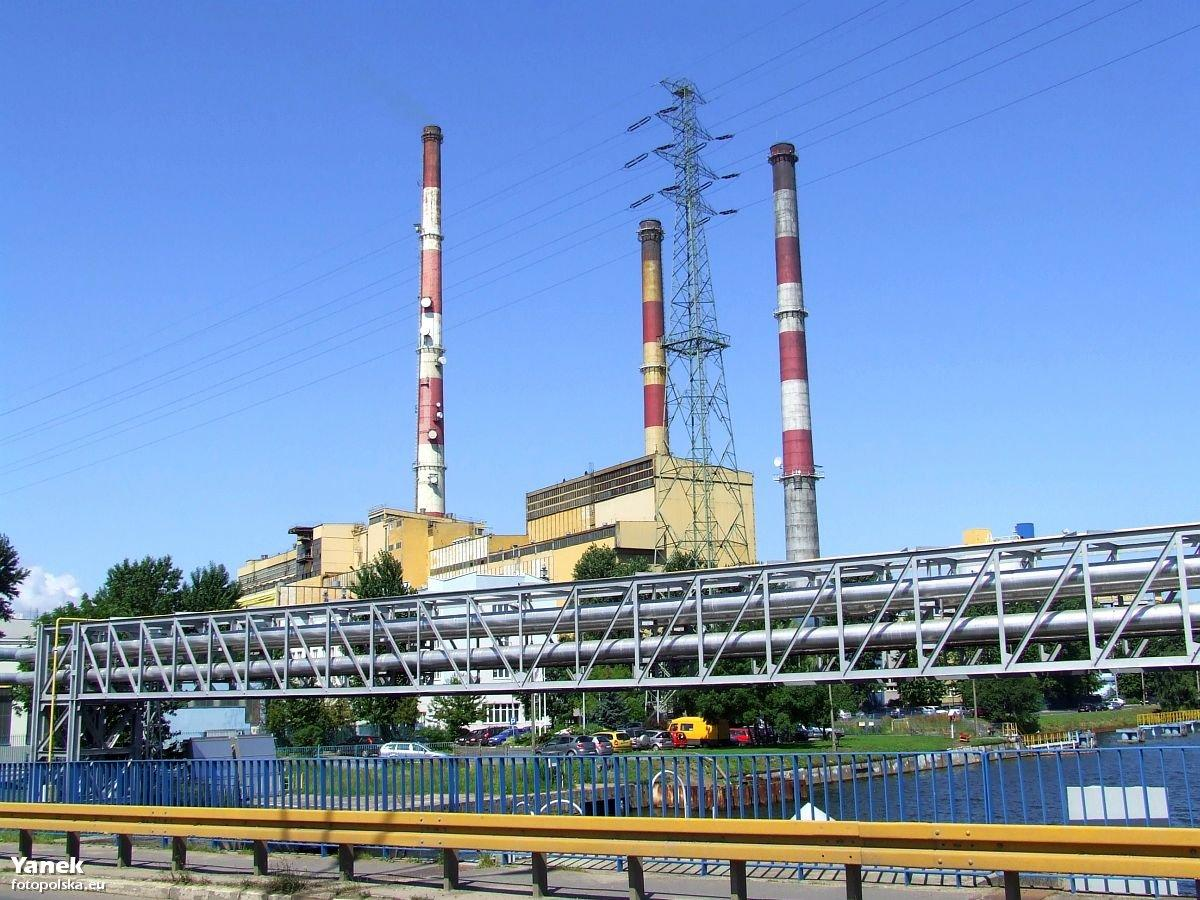
The cogeneration plant (Elektrociepłownia Gdańsk)

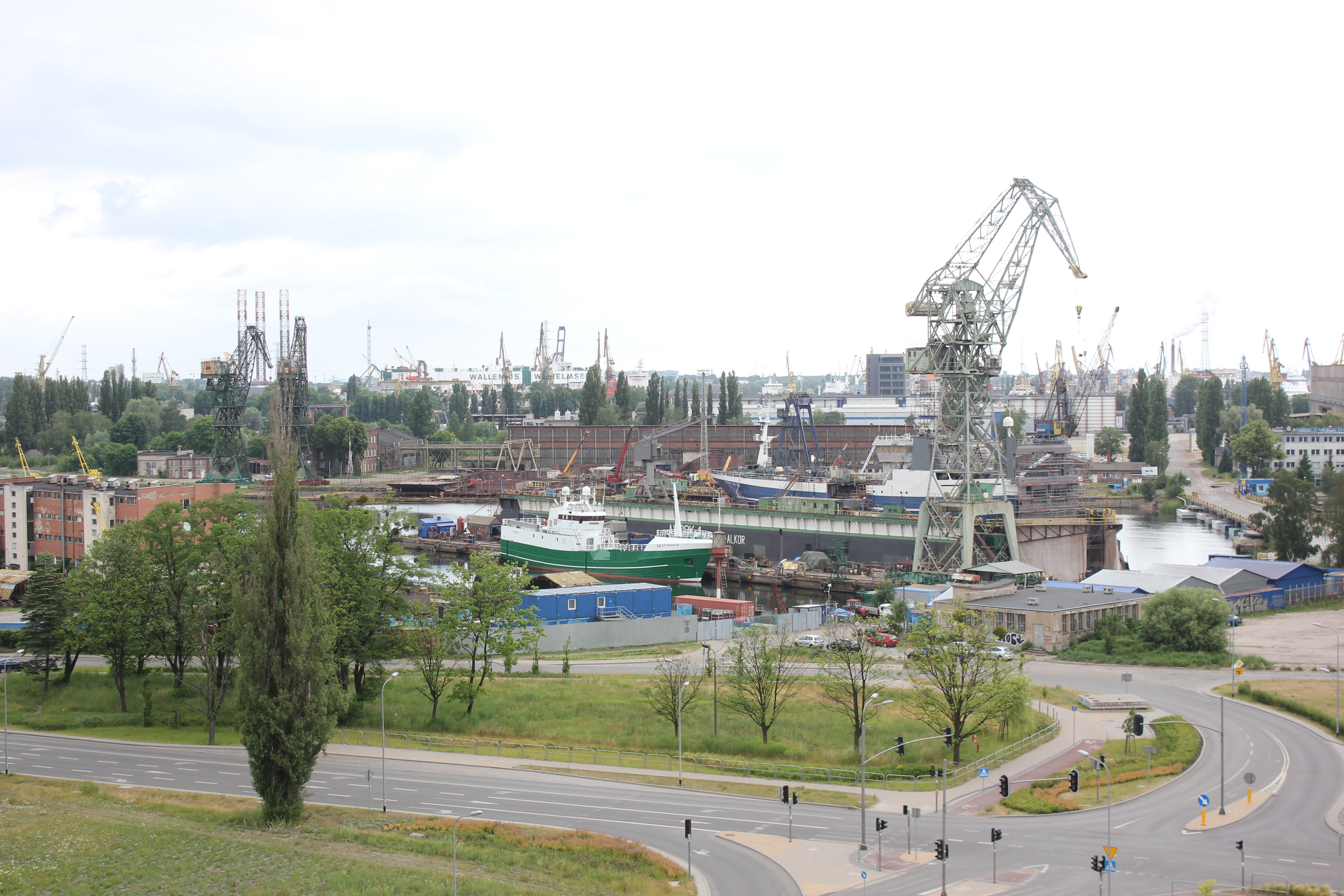
Młyniska, as viewed from the European Solidarity Centre

== Notable residents ==
- Georg Voigt (1866–1927), politician
