= Brzeźno =

- District (dzielnica)
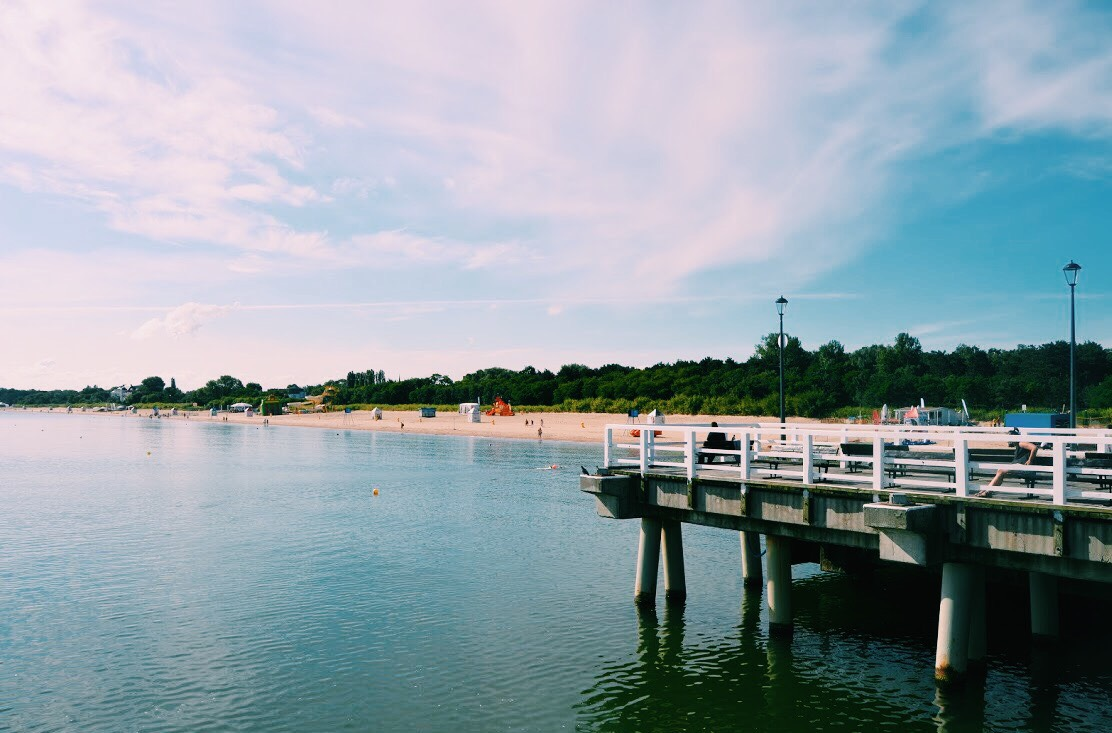
- View of the beach from Brzeźno Pier

- Location of Brzeźno within Gdańsk
- Coordinates: 54°24′27″N 18°37′53″E
- Country: Poland
- Voivodeship: Pomeranian
- County/City: Gdańsk

Area
  - Total: 2.74 km^{2} (1.06 sq mi)

Population (2011)
  - Total: 13,457
  - Density: 4,910/km^{2} (12,700/sq mi)
- Time zone: UTC+1 (CET)
  - Summer (DST): UTC+2 (CEST)
- Postal code: 80-506; 80-528
- Area code: +48 58

Brzeźno (Polish pronunciation: [ˡbʐɛʑnɔ]; Kashubian: Brzézno; German: Brösen /b̥ʁøzn/) is one of the quarters of the city of Gdańsk, Poland with a sandy beach and 130 m long pier.

== Location ==
The north of the quarter is bordered by the Bay of Gdańsk. From the east, it is bordered by the suburbs of Nowy Port and Letnica, from the south by Wrzeszcz Dolny and from the west by Zaspa-Rozstaje and Przymorze Wielkie.

Ronald Reagan Park is nearby.

== Etymology ==
There are numerous speculations surrounding the name "Brzeźno". According to one, the word "Brzeźno" was the name of a lake, with the possessive suffix -no, added to brzoza (birch). Thus, the name of the lake derives from birch trees surrounding its waters. The lake was located by the settlement named Prusęcino (deriving from the Old Prussians that lived there). It is believed that Prusęcino changed its name to Bresno (first noted in 1323). Due to the double-meaning of the name Bresno, the name of the lake was changed to Zaspa. The other hypothesis for the naming of the settlement derives from the word brzeg (Polish: coast), in regards to the coastal location of Brzeźno.

== History ==
Brzeźno was a private church village of the abbey in Oliwa, administratively located in the Gdańsk County in the Pomeranian Voivodeship of the Kingdom of Poland.

== Tourism ==
Tourist attractions:

- Brzeźno Pier
- Fortifications from the nineteenth and twentieth-century
- Guarded beach
- Bicycle route to Sopot
- Brzeźno Park
- Two abele trees – natural monuments, located by the crossroad of Południowa and Pułaska Street.

== Gallery ==
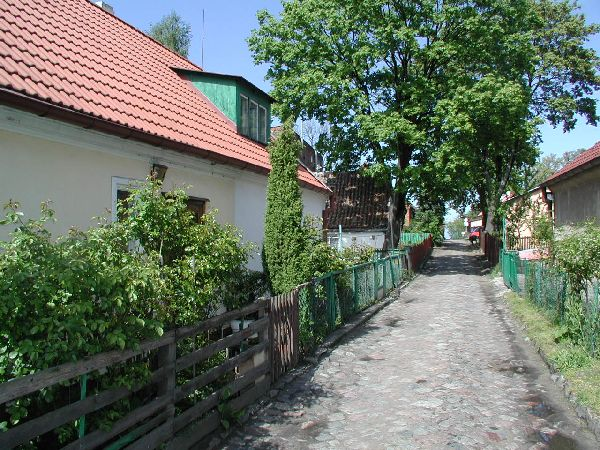
Former Brzeźno fishing village Miła Street

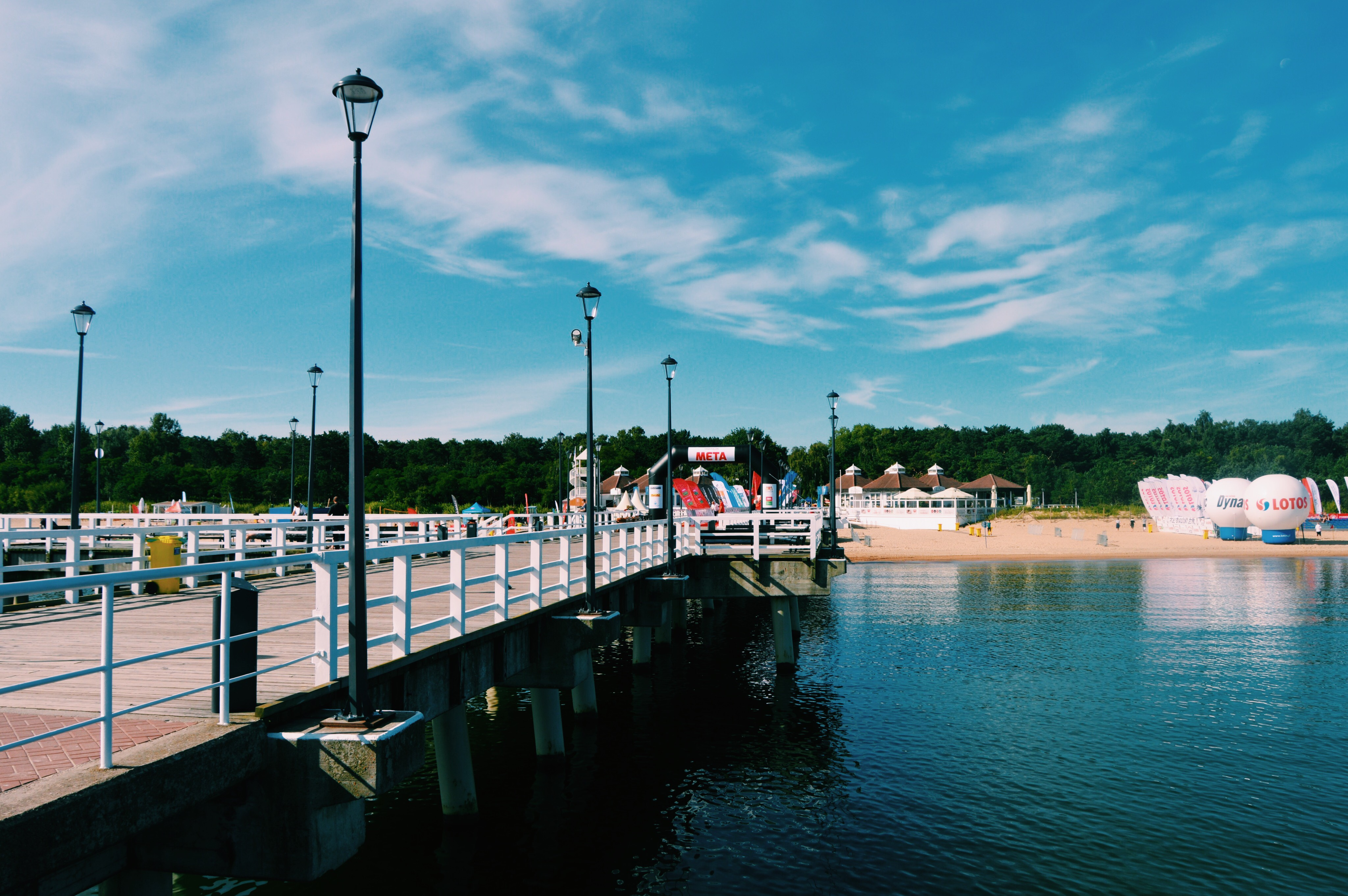
Brzeźno Pier

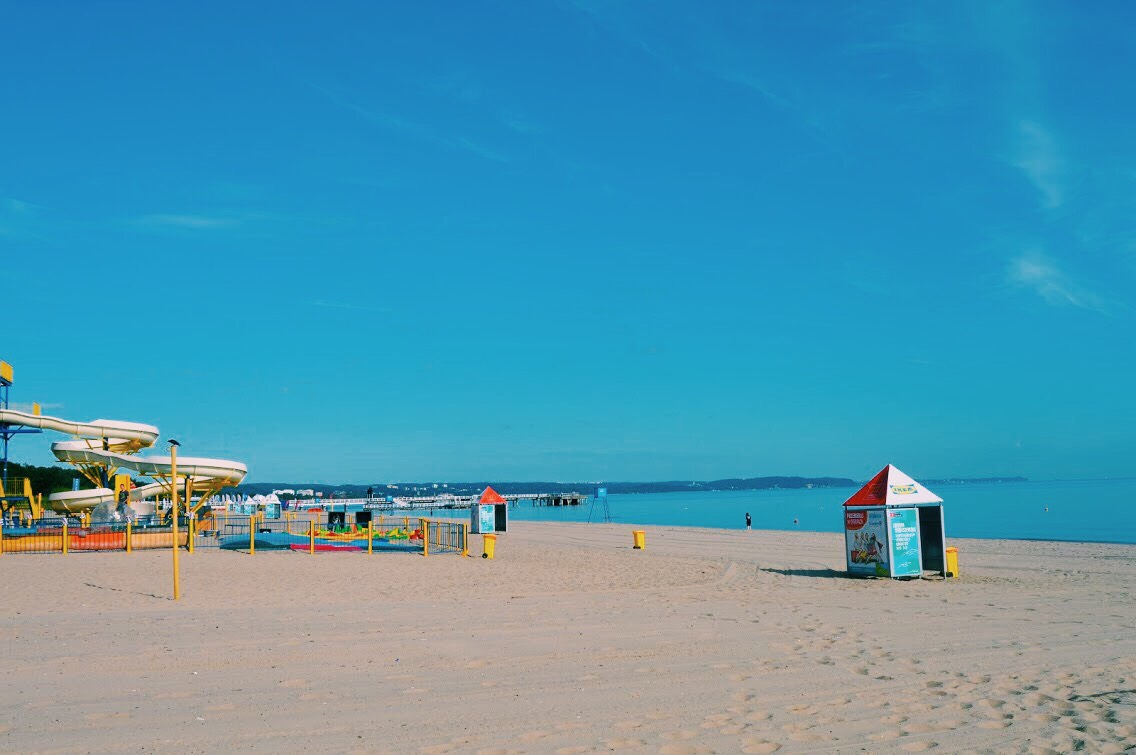
Beach in Brzeźno
