= Żabianka (disambiguation) =

Żabianka is a neighbourhood of Gdańsk and a quarter of:

- Żabianka-Wejhera-Jelitkowo-Tysiąclecia, an administrative district of Gdańsk

Żabianka may also refer to the following villages:

- Żabianka, Lublin Voivodeship (east Poland)
- Żabianka, Masovian Voivodeship (east-central Poland)
