= Olivia Star =

Skyscraper in Gdańsk, Poland

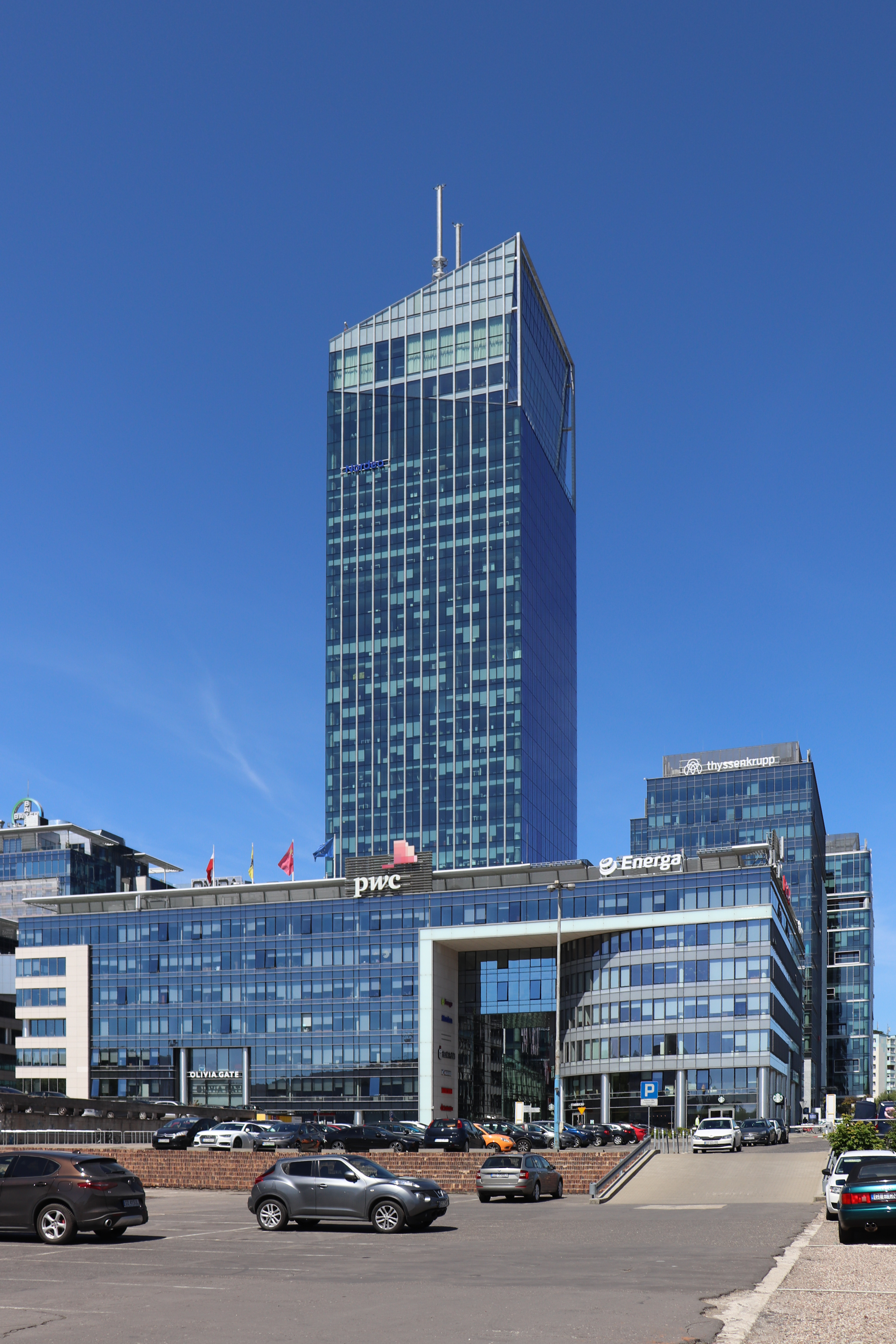
- Olivia Star in 2020
- Interactive map of the Olivia Star area

General information
- Architectural style: Modern
- Location: ul. Grunwaldzka 472C
- Coordinates: 54.4037°N 18.5706°E
- Year built: 2015–2018
- Groundbreaking: 30 June 2016
- Opened: 2018

Height
- Tip: 180 metres (590 ft)
- Roof: 156 metres (512 ft)

Technical details
- Floor count: 35
- Floor area: 67,672 m^{2} (728,420 ft^{2})

Design and construction
- Architecture firm: BJK Architekci

Website
- oliviacentre.com/pl/olivia-star

Olivia Star is a skyscraper and office building in Gdańsk, Poland. It is located in Oliwa and is one of the buildings of the Olivia Centre. At a total height of 180 metres (590 ft), it is the tallest building in Gdańsk, as well as all of northern Poland.

== Characteristics ==
The building has a height of 156 metres (512 ft) up to its roof, but its highest tip is found 180 metres (590 ft) up. It has 67,672 m^{2} (728,420 ft^{2}) of floor area, of which 59,280 m^{2} (638,100 ft^{2}) is utilized commercially; of the latter, 45,690 m^{2} (491,800 ft^{2}) is used for offices. It has 35 floors and designed by Konior & Partners Architects of Warsaw, but its construction was overseen by BJK Architekci of Gdynia.

It is the tallest building in northern Poland and among the tallest buildings in Poland overall. Its height of 180 m is designed to allude to the events of 1980 in Gdańsk Shipyard, while the shape of its tallest section resembles that of the nearby Hala Olivia. The top floors have been accessible to the public since 17 July 2019. A restaurant is located near the very top.

== History ==
Permission to construct Olivia Star was first granted in December 2013, allowing for the construction of a building measuring 44 metres (144 ft) in height, but plans were revised, greatly increasing its size. The plans for the creation of a skyscraper were publicly revealed in June 2016. The construction process was rapid; the cornerstone for the building was laid on 30 June 2016, and by 13 September, it had grown to a height of 20 floors.

It was eventually completed in April 2018, and first ceremonially lit up in May. On 17 July 2019, an observation point was opened on the 32nd floor, becoming the third such point installed on a skyscraper in Poland after those on the Palace of Culture and Science in Warsaw and Sky Tower in Wrocław.
