= Żabianka-Wejhera-Jelitkowo-Tysiąclecia =

- District (dzielnica)
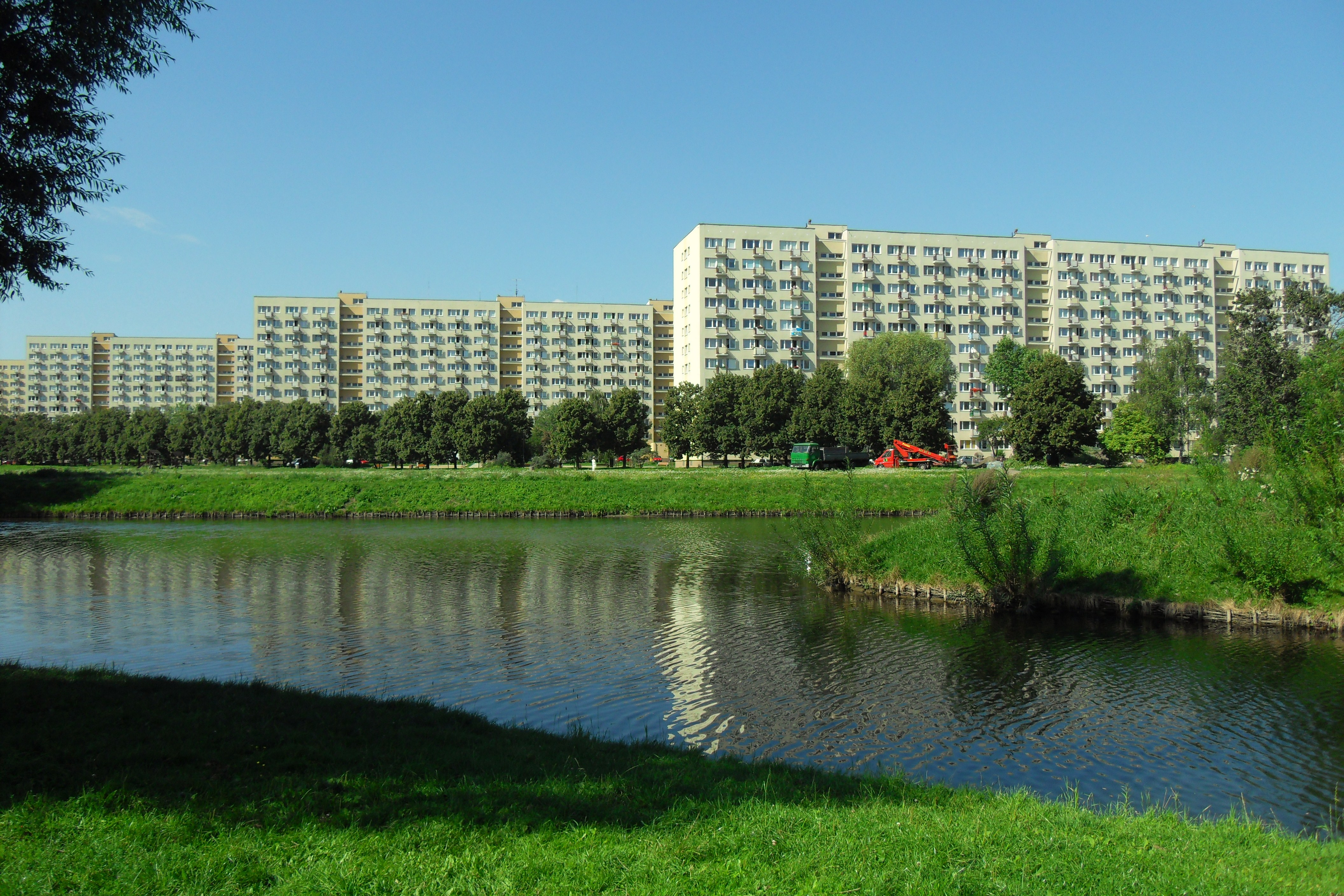
- Potok Oliwski in Żabianka

- Location of Żabianka-Wejhera-Jelitkowo-Tysiąclecia within Gdańsk
- Coordinates: 54°25′15″N 18°34′30″E
- Country: Poland
- Voivodeship: Pomeranian
- County/City: Gdańsk

Area
  - Total: 2.334 km^{2} (0.901 sq mi)

Population (2011)
  - Total: 18,546
  - Density: 7,946/km^{2} (20,580/sq mi)
- Time zone: UTC+1 (CET)
  - Summer (DST): UTC+2 (CEST)
- Area code: +48 58

Żabianka-Wejhera-Jelitkowo-Tysiąclecia (Kashubian: Żôbiónka-Wejra-Jelëtkòwò-Tësąclatégò) is one of the administrative districts (dzielnica administracyjna) of the city of Gdańsk, Poland.

== Location ==
The northeast of the district is bordered by the Bay of Gdańsk. From the north, the district is bordered by the town of Sopot, from the south by the districts of Przymorze Wielkie and Przymorze Małe and from the west by the district of Oliwa. Potok Oliwski is a small stream with a length of 9.6 km.

Quarters of Żabianka-Wejhera-Jelitkowo-Tysiąclecia are:

- Żabianka (Poggenkrug)
- Wejhera, named after Jakub Wejher
- Jelitkowo (Glettkau)
- Tysiąclecia (translated millennium).

== History ==
In 1926, the area and the village of Glettkau (as a part of Oliwa) became part of the city of Danzig (Gdańsk). Since 1909 it has been a small spa with a Kurhaus. The remains of the ruined pier were finally removed in July 1964. Gdańsk Żabianka railway station opened in December 1975. The fast city train services are operated by SKM Tricity.

== Tourism ==
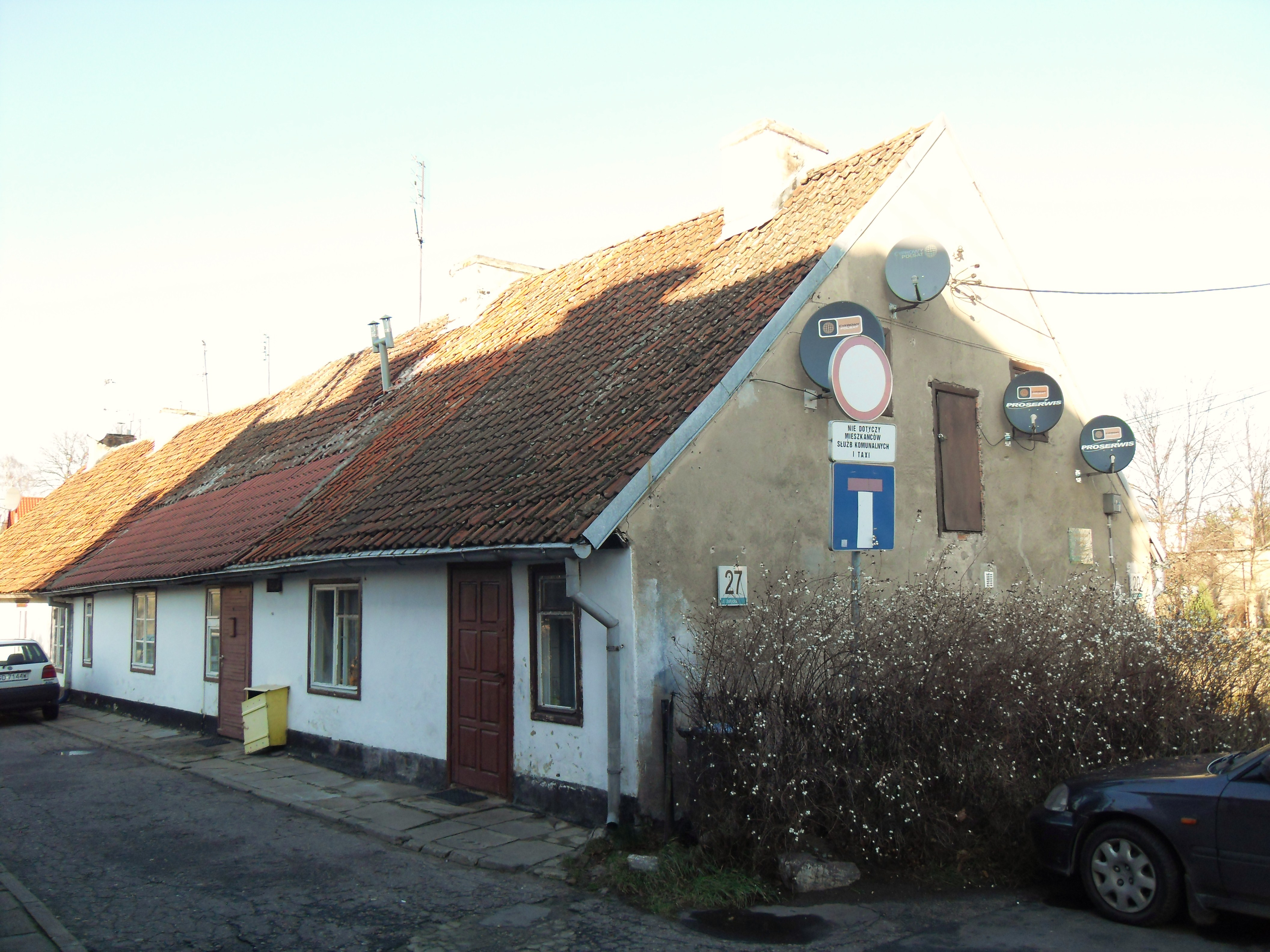
Fishermen's houses in Jelitkowo

Tourist attractions:

- The sandy beach of Jelitkowo with a tram station nearby
- Ergo Arena (Hala Gdańsk-Sopot), a multi-purpose indoor arena, that was opened in 2010
- The churches
  - pw. Chrystusa Odkupiciela
  - pw. Matki Bożej Fatimskiej
- Small fishermen's houses in Jelitkowo, 18th and 19th century
- Park Jelitkowski
- Park Przymorze.
