= Jelitkowo =

Coordinates: 54°26′N 18°36′E

- Neighbourhood of Gdańsk
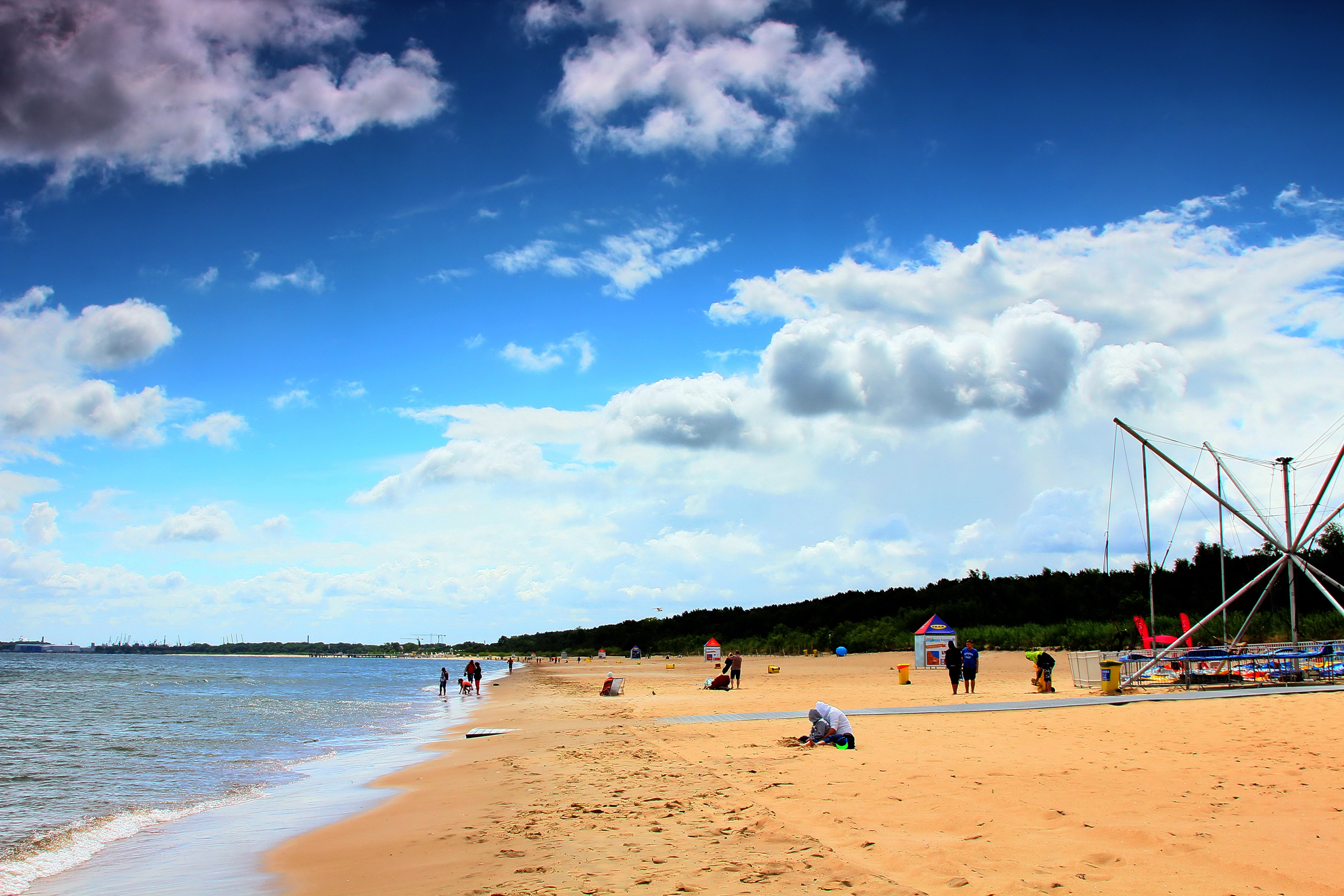
- Beach in Jelitkowo
- Interactive map of Jelitkowo
- Country: Poland
- Voivodeship: Pomeranian
- County/City: Gdańsk
- District: Żabianka-Wejhera-Jelitkowo-Tysiąclecia
- Time zone: UTC+1 (CET)
  - Summer (DST): UTC+2 (CEST)

Jelitkowo (German: Glettkau) is one of the quarters of Żabianka-Wejhera-Jelitkowo-Tysiąclecia in the city of Gdańsk, just south of Sopot, Poland.

As part of the Crown of the Kingdom of Poland it was a private church village of the Cistercian Monastery in Oliwa, administratively located in the Gdańsk County in the Pomeranian Voivodeship.

Located on the seaside, with beautiful sandy beaches, the town became known as an Ostsee-Bad Glettkau, a Baltic Sea (spa-vacation town). Some important hotels, windsurfing schools, and centres of water sports are in today's Jelitkowo. In the past, an old tram route ran from Danzig, the main city, to the tram loop in Glettkau. It now runs from Gdańsk to Jelitkowo.

The population (together with Żabianka) is 23,145 inhabitants on an area of 2.1 km^{2} (population density 10,923 inhabitants/km^{2}).

Sea-front Jelitkowo encompasses coastal Jelitkowo Beach, famous in the summer with local people, who package the Out Door health club, windsurfing schools, and volleyball courts. Park Jelitkowski includes calm, shaded paths, and a couple of historical, white-washed fishermen's cottages sit close to its northwestern border. Ice cream kiosks and bucolic beer bars miss the shore, with al-fresco taverns offering breaded cod or herring dishes.
