= Hala Olivia =

Arena in Gdańsk, Poland

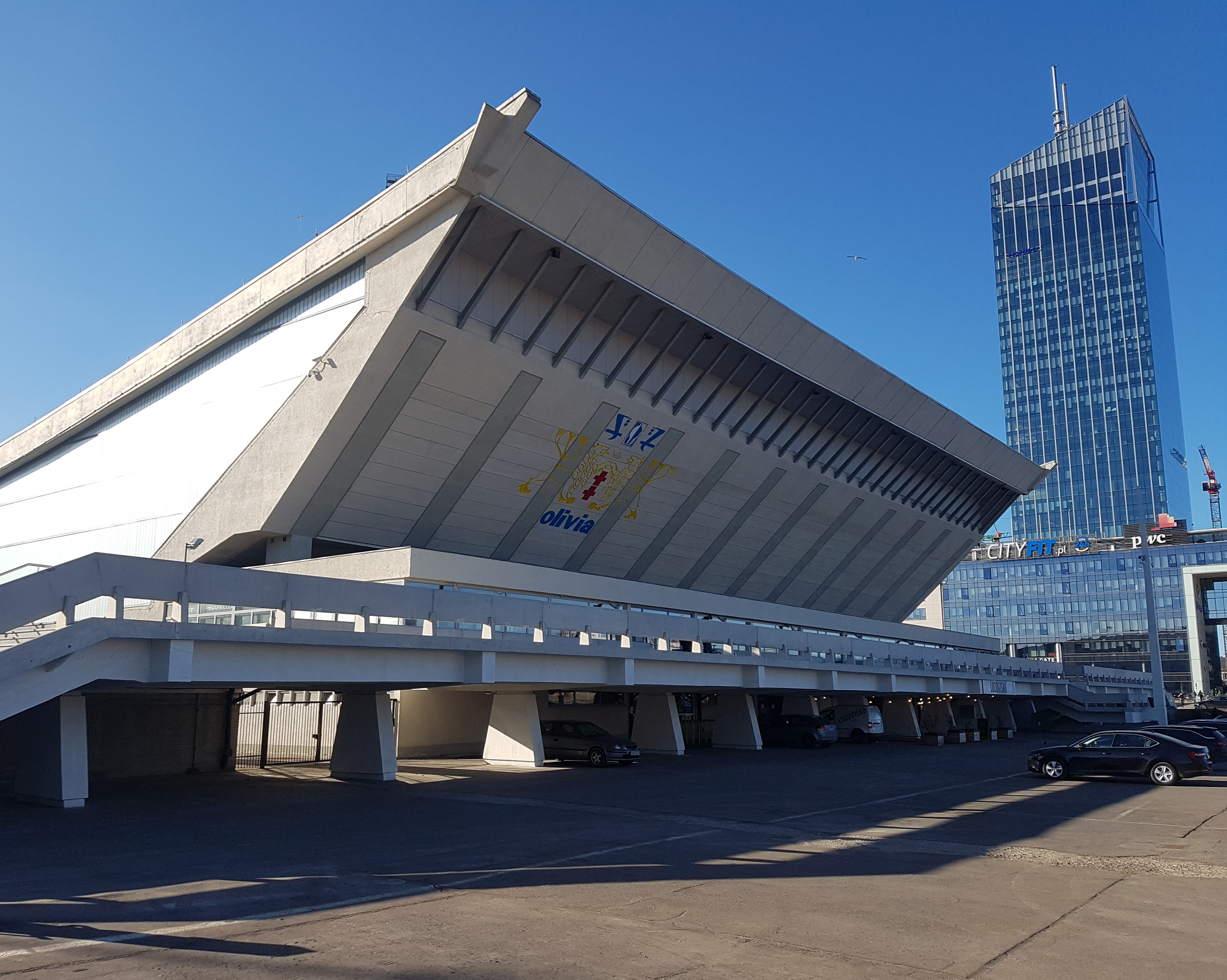
- Hala Olivia, 2019
- Interactive map of Hala Olivia
- Address: al. Grunwaldzka 470; 80-309 Gdańsk
- Coordinates: 54°24′4.77″N 18°34′19.64″E
- Owner: Stoczniowiec Gdańsk
- Capacity: 4,667 (permanent seats); 6,500 (highest possible capacity)
- Field size: 12 metres (39 ft) tall

Construction
- Built: 1965–1972
- Opened: 16 December 1972

Hala Olivia is an arena and hotel located in Oliwa, Gdańsk, located close to the Olivia Centre and main campus of the University of Gdańsk. It is owned by Stoczniowiec Gdańsk, which is its main tenant.

== Characteristics and location ==
The building has a volume of 80,000 m^{3} (2,800,000 ft^{3}) and a height of 12 metres (39 ft). It consists of two halls, one with 3,867 permanent seats, and one with 800. The former can handle up to 6,500 people at once.

It is owned and used by Stoczniowiec Gdańsk, the city of Gdańsk's ice hockey team. It also contains a 50-room hotel, Hotel Olivia. Found at the intersection of two roads – al. Grunwaldzka and ul. Bażyńskiego – the arena is located very close to the Olivia Centre, a business park containing the largest building in northern Poland.

== History ==
The arena was designed by Stanisław Kuś, Maciej Krasiński, and Maciej Gintowt, for the purposes of housing the ice hockey team Stoczniowiec Gdańsk. It was constructed over the course of seven years. It was designed to resemble a boat sailing among sea waves. The first national conference of Solidarność took place there in 1981.

Hala Olivia was closed from 11 to 28 December 2007 due to the risk of its roof caving in; the roof was then repaired, with the repairs being finished in November 2010. In December 2014, a general renovation of the whole building began. At a cost of 22 million zł, in 2016, another renovation was carried out, restoring it to its initial condition, as it had appeared in 1972.
