= Sopot Wyścigi railway station =

Railway station in Sopot, Poland

Sopot Wyścigi
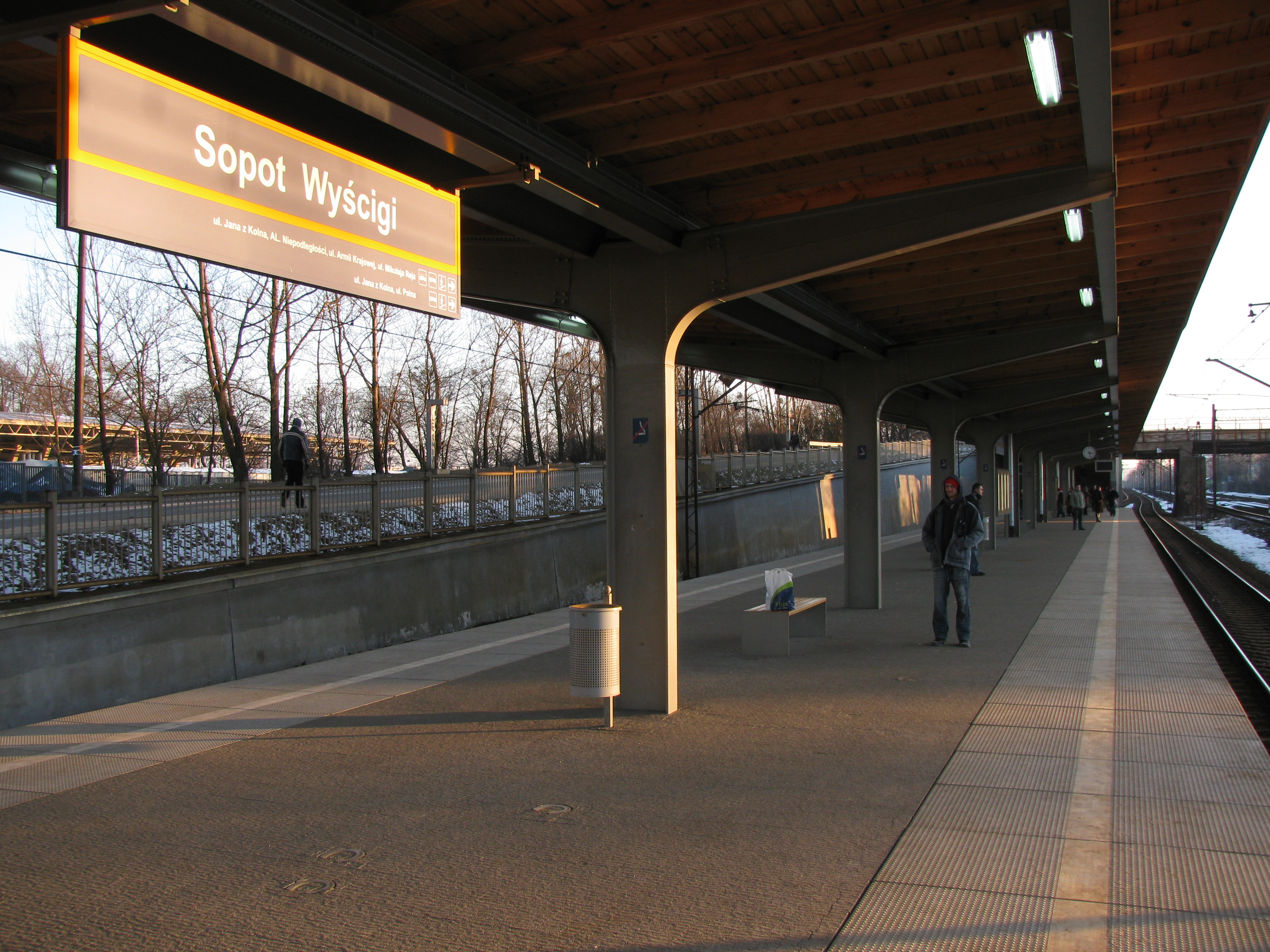

General information
- Location: Sopot, Pomeranian Voivodeship; Poland
- System: Railway Station
- Operator: SKM Tricity
- Line: 250: Gdańsk Śródmieście–Rumia railway
- Platforms: 2
- Tracks: 6

History
- Opened: 1950; 76 years ago
Location
- Location within Poland

Sopot Wyścigi railway station is a railway station serving the city of Sopot, in the Pomeranian Voivodeship, Poland. The station opened by 1950 and is located on the Gdańsk Śródmieście–Rumia railway. The train services are operated by SKM Tricity.

The name is derived from nearby horse racing centre (pl. Wyscigi).

A map from 1919 shows that before World War II, the stop was in a historical town called Schmierau and was located approximately 1 km away from the current station in the direction of Gdańsk. Meanwhile, a modern source reports that it used to be a seasonal stop, used only during organised racing, with a direct connection to the racecourse. This station was only 200 m away from the current platform. On the 2nd of January 1952, the station was moved to its current location due to the opening of the Rapid Urban Rail line.

== Train services ==
The station is served by the following services:

- Szybka Kolej Miejska services (SKM) (Lębork -) Wejherowo - Reda - Rumia - Gdynia - Sopot - Gdansk

Preceding station	SKM Tricity	Following station
Sopot towards Wejherowo or Lębork	SKM Tricity	Gdańsk Żabianka towards Gdańsk Śródmieście

== Gallery ==
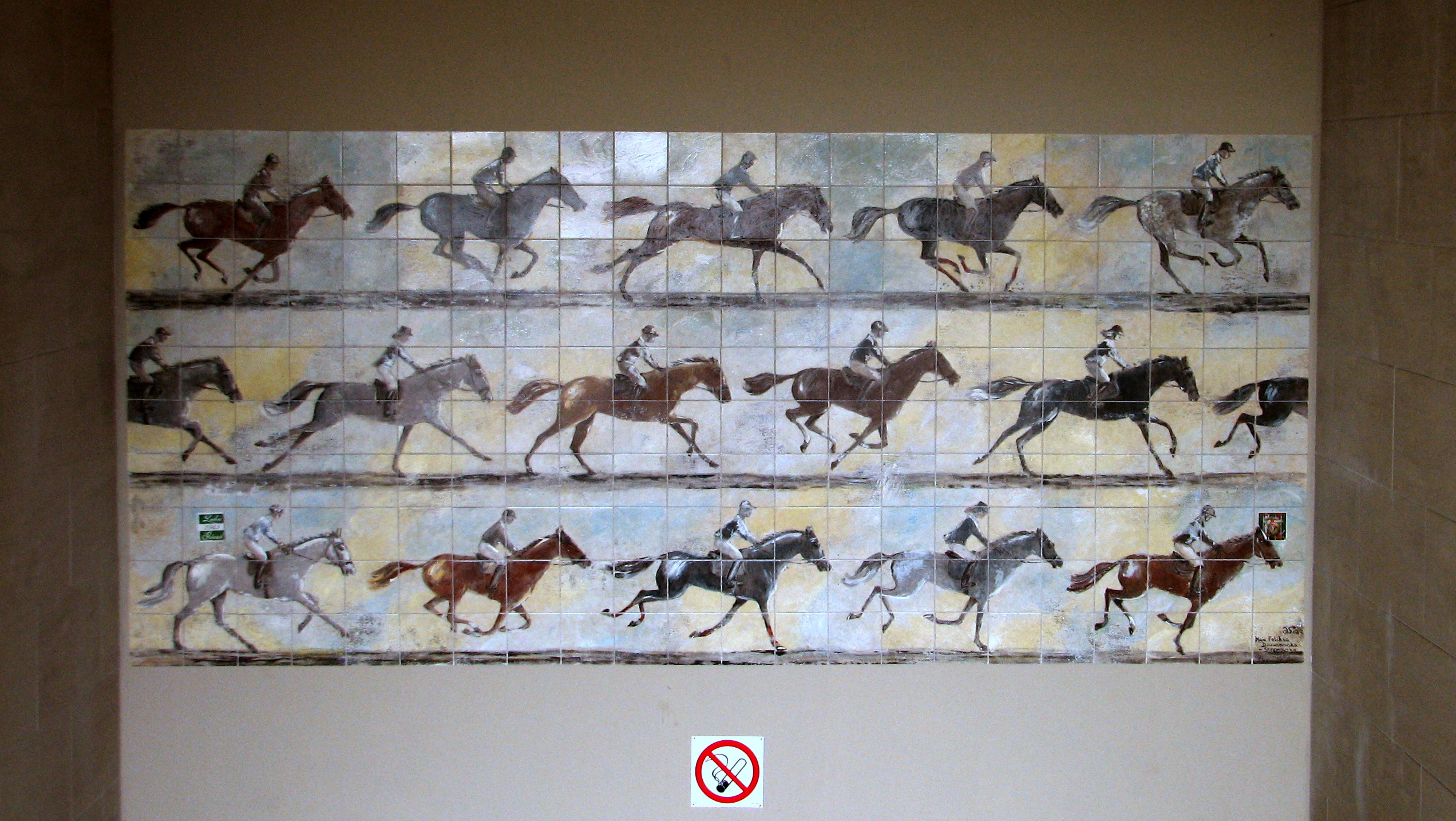
The station is decorated with jockeys on horses.

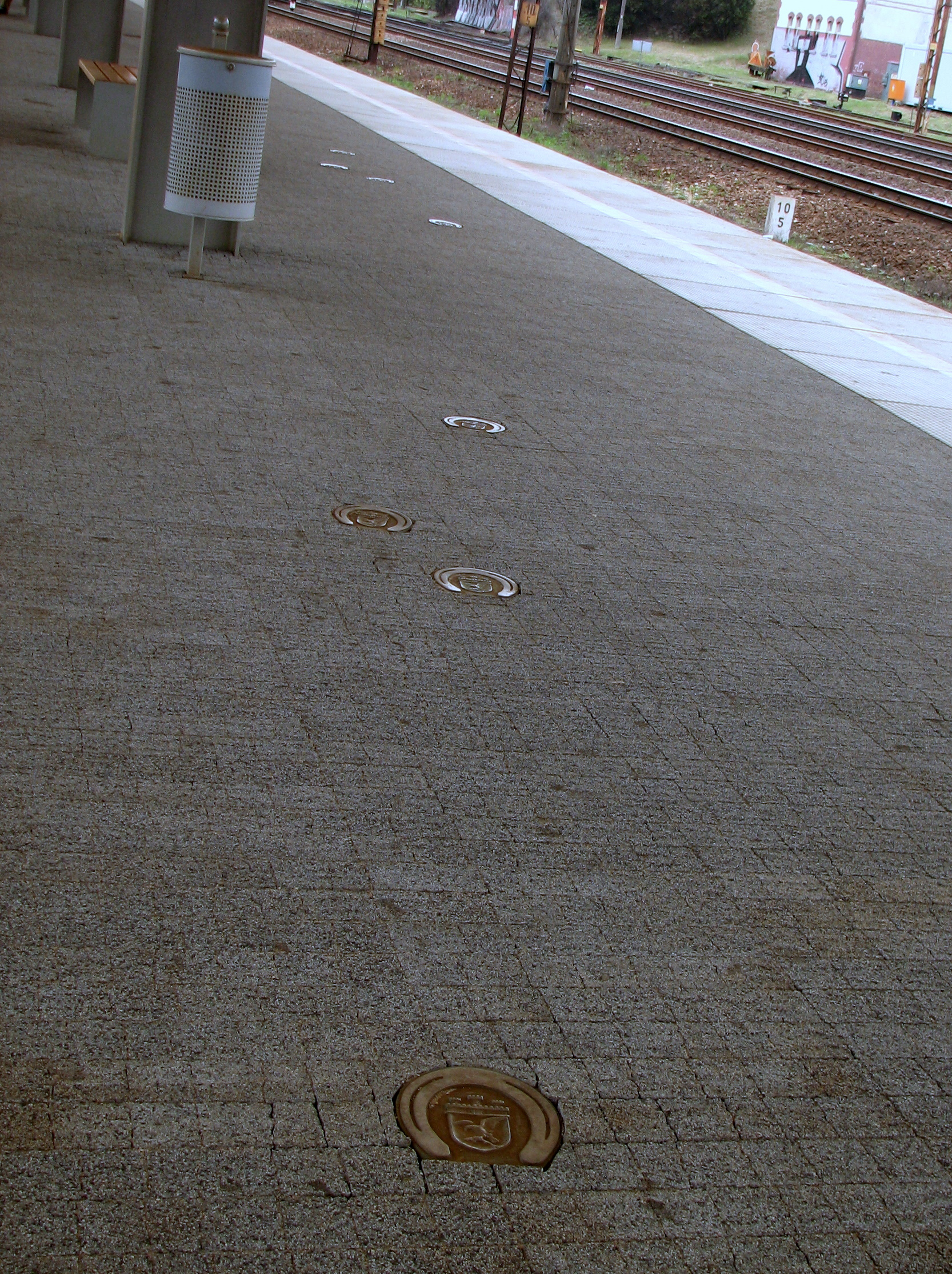
In some places horseshoes can be seen on the platform
