= Gdańsk Żabianka railway station =

Railway station in Gdańsk, Poland

Gdańsk Żabianka-AWFiS
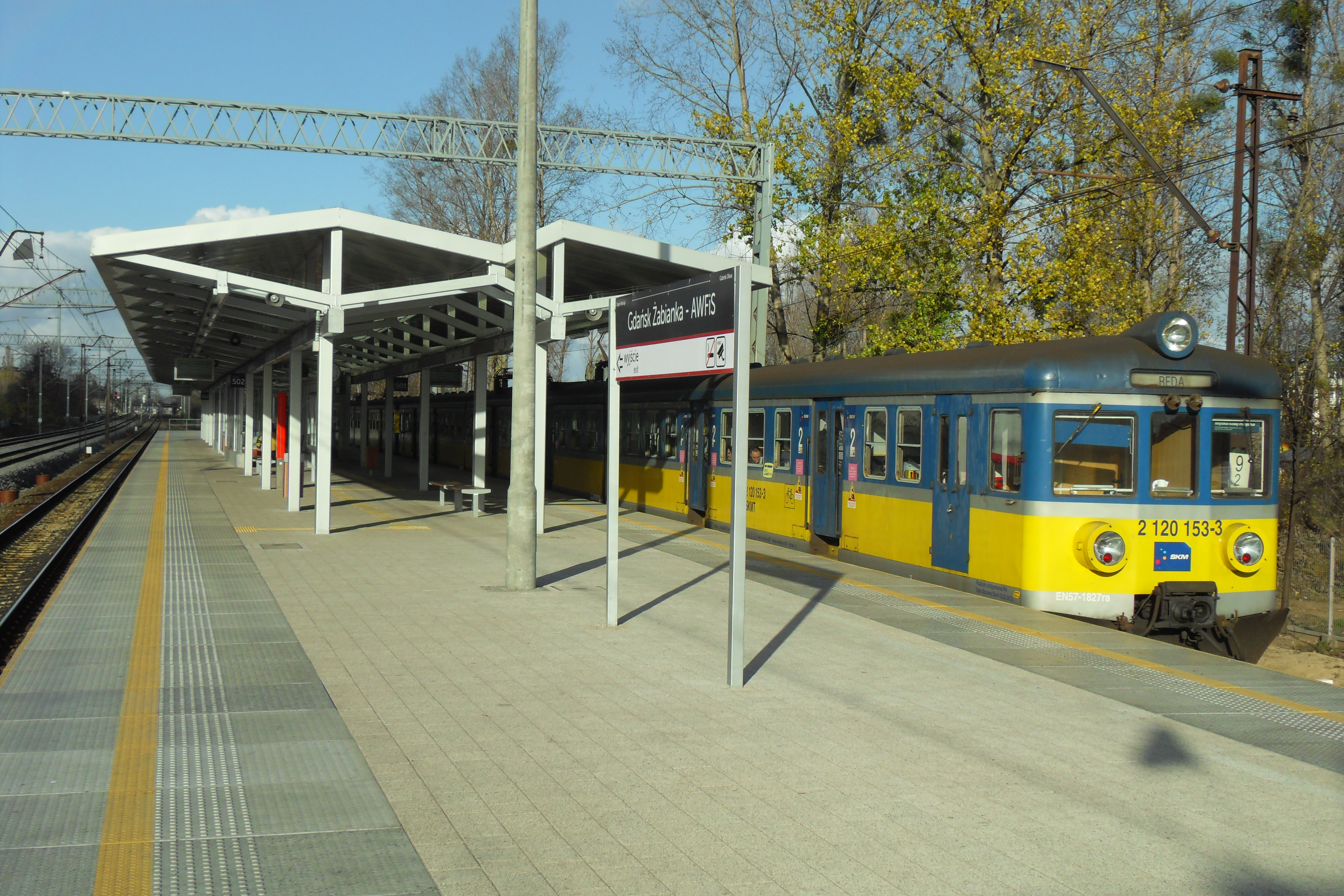

General information
- Location: Gdańsk, Pomeranian Voivodeship; Poland
- System: Railway Station
- Operator: SKM Tricity
- Line: 250: Gdańsk Śródmieście–Rumia railway
- Platforms: 2
- Tracks: 4

History
- Opened: 1975; 51 years ago
Location
- Location within Poland

Gdańsk Żabianka railway station is a railway station serving the city of Gdańsk, in the Pomeranian Voivodeship, Poland. The station opened in 1975 and is located on the Gdańsk Śródmieście–Rumia railway. The train services are operated by SKM Tricity.

The name is derived from one of city quarters called Żabianka.

== General information ==
An underpass leads to the platform, connecting both sides of tracks. There is a ticket office and few outlets located in the underway. The ticket office is opened from 5 am (6 am in the weekend) till 9 pm.

== Train services ==
The station is served by the following services:

- Szybka Kolej Miejska services (SKM) (Lębork -) Wejherowo - Reda - Rumia - Gdynia - Sopot - Gdansk

Preceding station	SKM Tricity	Following station
Sopot Wyścigi towards Wejherowo or Lębork	SKM Tricity	Gdańsk Oliwa towards Gdańsk Śródmieście
