= Olivia Centre =

Business park in Gdańsk, Poland

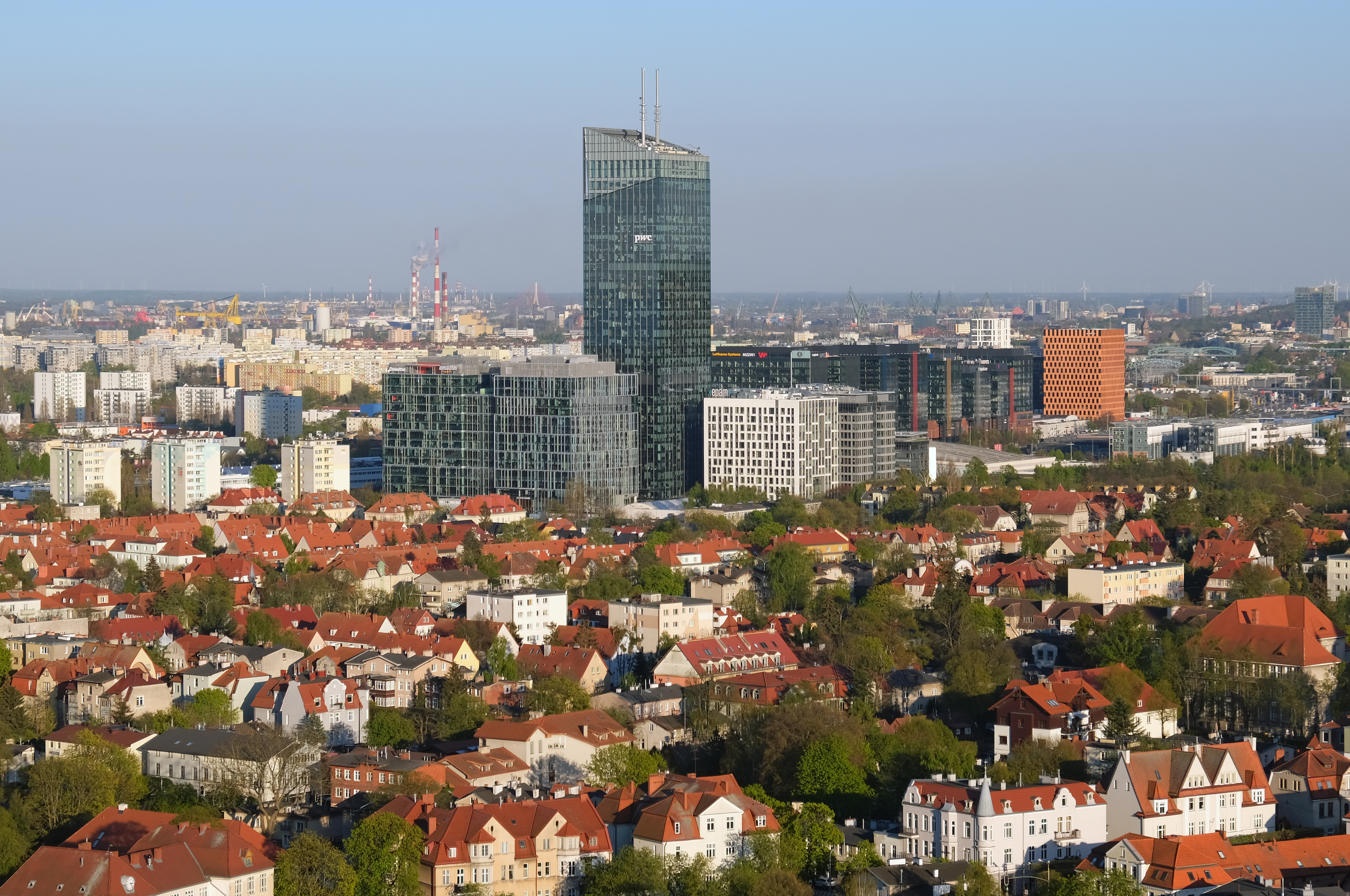
- The business park in 2023
- Interactive map of the Olivia Centre area

General information
- Location: al. Grunwaldzka 472A–D
- Coordinates: 54.4037°N 18.5706°E
- Year built: 2010–today

Height
- Height: 180 m (590 ft) (highest point)

Technical details
- Floor area: 230,000 m^{2} (2,500,000 ft^{2})

Design and construction
- Architecture firm: Konior and Partners Architects, BJK Architekci

Website
- oliviacentre.com

The Olivia Centre, formerly known as the Olivia Business Centre, is a business park located in Oliwa, Gdańsk. It is the largest business park in northern Poland and includes the tallest building in northern Poland, Olivia Star.

== Buildings and characteristics ==
The Olivia Centre is built in a modern style and consists of several buildings; 8 buildings have been completed in the park as of 2025. They have approximately 230,000 m^{2} (2,500,000 ft^{2}) of combined floor area, 175,000 m^{2} (1,880,000 ft^{2}) of which is used as office space. The buildings all share the address Grunwaldzka 472, but with different alphabetical suffixes. The following buildings are part of the park, from earliest to latest completed:

- Olivia Gate, completed in 2011, was the first building constructed in the Centre. It has 30,565 m^{2} (329,000 ft^{2}) of floor area and a height of 28 metres (92 ft).
- Olivia Point, completed in January 2013, has a height of 29 m (95 ft) and 14,150 m^{2} (152,300 ft^{2}) of floor area.
- Olivia Tower, also completed in January 2013, has a height of 47 m (154 ft) and 19,800 m^{2} (213,000 ft^{2}) of floor area.
- Olivia Four, completed in March 2014, has a height of 47 m (154 ft) and 20,500 m^{2} (221,000 ft^{2}) of floor area.
- Olivia Six, the fifth building, completed in May 2015, has a height of 55 m (180 ft) and 27,700 m^{2} (298,000 ft^{2}) of floor area.
- Olivia Star, originally Olivia Five, completed in April 2018, is a skyscraper and the tallest building in northern Poland, at a height of 180 m (590 ft) and with 67,672 m^{2} (728,420 ft^{2}) of floor area.
- Olivia Prime, constructed in two sections, was completed in 2020 and constructed in two segments. It is 55 m (180 ft) tall and has 30,000 m^{2} (320,000 ft^{2}) of floor area.
- Olivia Eight, completed in December 2019, is 55 m (180 ft) tall and has 25,000 m^{2} (270,000 ft^{2}) of floor area.

== History and construction ==
The Olivia Business Centre was first proposed in 2009 by an eponymous investment group, with work on the first building, Olivia Gate, beginning in March 2010. The next two buildings to be completed were Olivia Point and Olivia Tower, both opened in January 2013. The next building, completed in March 2014, was Olivia Four. Once the fifth building, Olivia Six, was completed in May 2015, the Olivia Business Centre became the second-largest business park in Poland.

In April 2015, work began on Olivia Star, the next part of the park and the tallest building in northern Poland. It was completed in April 2018 and has a total height of 180 metres (590 ft). The next component, Olivia Prime A, another skyscraper, was completed in 2018, and the accompanying Prime B was completed in 2020. Olivia Eight, another building, was completed in December 2019. Since 2023, two apartment buildings, Olivia Nord and Olivia Nowa, are being built. The construction of another such building, Olivia Pulse, was proposed in February 2025.
