= Oliwa =

- District (dzielnica)
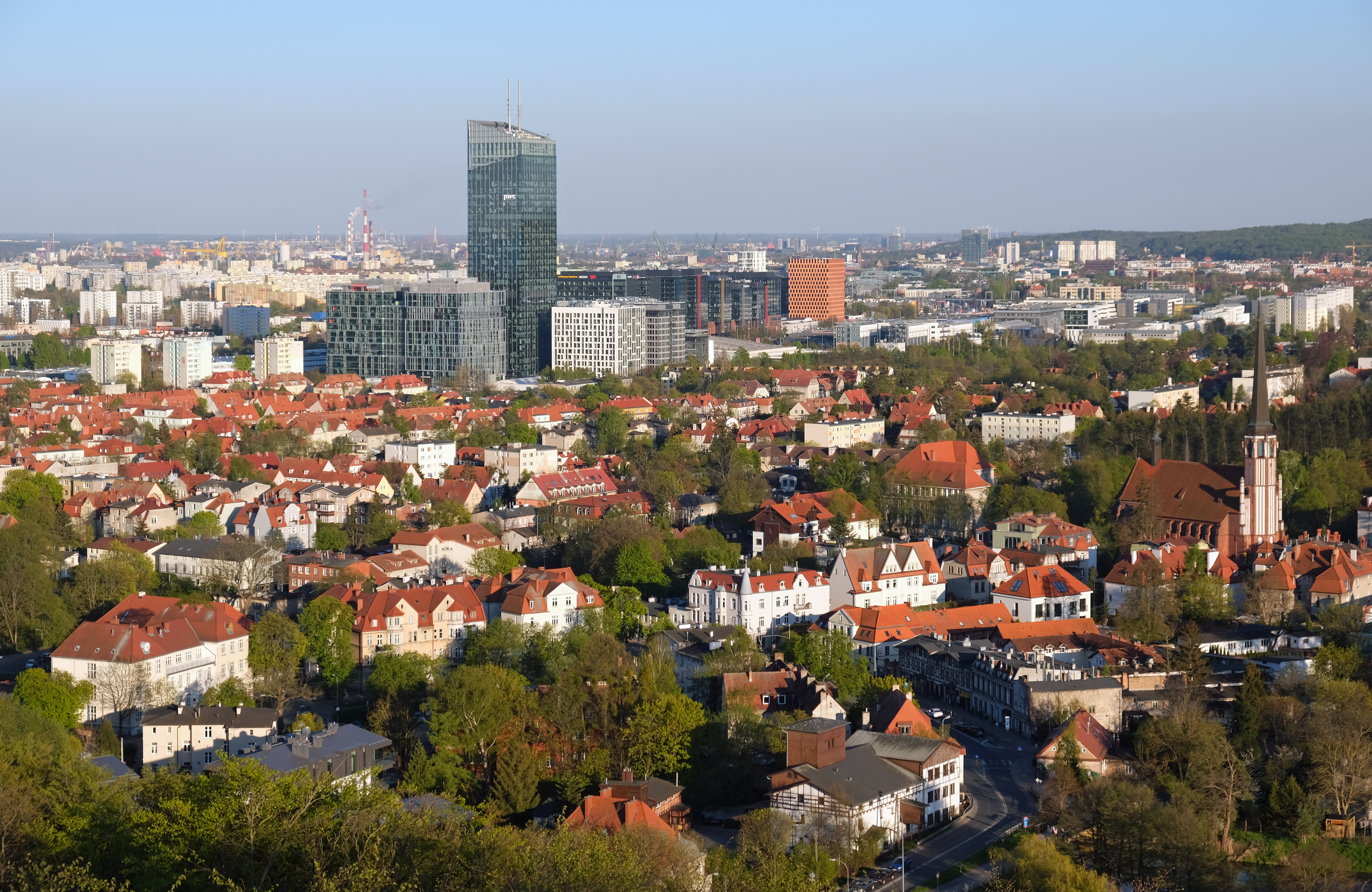
- View of Oliwa from the Pachołek Hill

- Location of Oliwa within Gdańsk
- Coordinates: 54°24′38″N 18°33′32″E
- Country: Poland
- Voivodeship: Pomeranian
- County/City: Gdańsk
- First mentioned: 1186
- Within city limits: 1926

Area
  - Total: 18.68 km^{2} (7.21 sq mi)

Population (2021)
  - Total: 14,882
  - Density: 796.7/km^{2} (2,063/sq mi)
- Time zone: UTC+1 (CET)
  - Summer (DST): UTC+2 (CEST)
- Vehicle registration: GD

Oliwa (Latin: Oliva; Kashubian: Òlëwa; German: Oliva) is a northern district of the city of Gdańsk, Poland. From east it borders Przymorze and Żabianka, from the north Sopot and from the south with the districts of Strzyża, VII Dwór and Brętowo, while from the west with Matarnia and Osowa. It is known for its medieval monastery with the Oliwa Cathedral, the 1627 Battle of Oliwa and the 1660 Treaty of Oliva.

== Administration ==
Oliwa is a part of the city of Gdańsk in northern Poland. It is bordered on the east by the Bay of Gdańsk (Zatoka Gdańska), on the north by the town of Sopot, on the south by the boroughs of Wrzeszcz and Zaspa and on the west by the chain of hills and forest surrounding Gdańsk. Except for the 'old city' Oliwa encompasses the boroughs of Polanki, Jelitkowo, Przymorze and Żabianka.

== Population and sites ==
The population in 2004 was 19,824. The area is 18.23 km^{2} (7.04 square miles) with a population density of 1,087/km^{2} (2,820 per square mile). The landmark of Oliwa is the Cistercian-Cathedral complex with the Oliwa Cathedral, Baroque Abbot's Palace, Adam Mickiewicz Park, botanical garden and old granaries. The complex is listed as a Historic Monument of Poland. The complex houses two branches of the National Museum in Gdańsk: the Department of Modern Art in the Abbot's Palace and the Ethnographic Department in one of the historic granaries. Other sights of Oliwa include the observation tower at the Pachołek Hill, the Gdańsk Zoo.

The Hala Olivia indoor arena, home venue of the Stoczniowiec Gdańsk ice hockey team, is located in Oliwa.

== History ==
=== Oliwa abbey ===
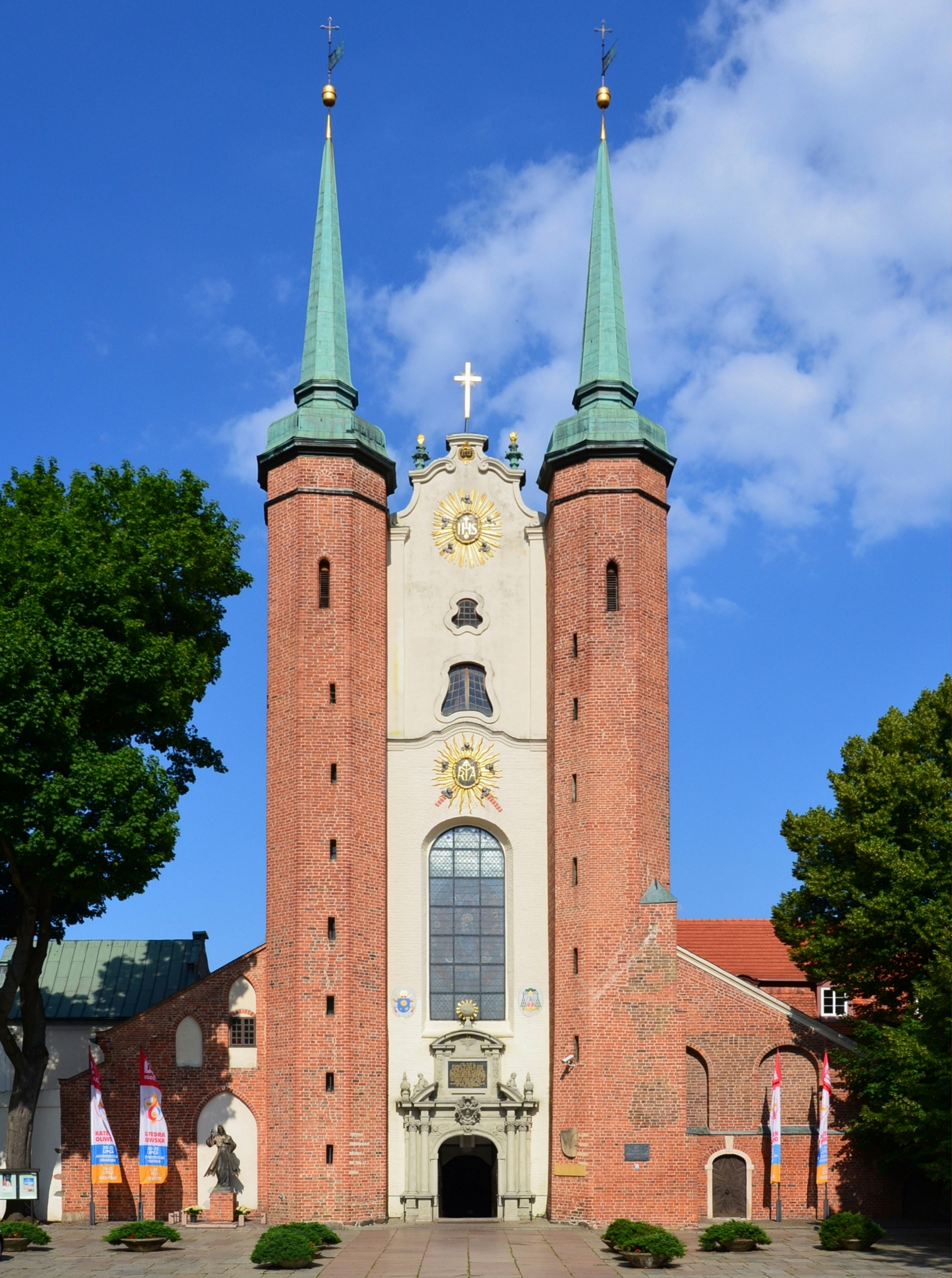
Oliwa Cathedral

It is not exactly known when Oliwa was established. Archaeological excavations suggest that the first settlement in this area was established in early Iron Age. The Cistercian monks' tradition (unconfirmed by other sources) speaks of it as an early seat of power of the Pomeranian Princes. The name of this suspected burgh is unknown.

The first mention of Oliwa dates to 1186 when the Cistercians established a monastery there. The Cistercian Monks named it Oliva, either derived from an older Slavic name or the biblical Mount of Olives or olive tree. The monks received a deed of ownership from Duke Sambor I of Pomerania in 1188. The deed encompassed a number of villages, including Oliwa which became a monastic village for long centuries to come. The village's history is directly linked to the development of the monastery.

The village was raided by Old Prussians in 1224 (1226?) and 1234 (1236?) and by Teutonic Knights in 1246, 1247 and 1252. In 1308, the Polish coastal region was invaded by the Margraviate of Brandenburg, and in 1309 it was captured and occupied by the Teutonic Knights in 1309 after the Teutonic takeover of Gdańsk, however, Poland made attempts to regain the region. In 1350, the monastery suffered a fire. In 1433, there were incursions of Hussites during the Hussite expedition to the Baltic. In 1454, King Casimir IV Jagiellon reincorporated the territory to the Kingdom of Poland. The subsequent Thirteen Years' War ended in 1466 with a peace treaty, confirming the reincorporation of Oliwa to Poland. Oliwa was a private church village of the local monastery, administratively located in the Gdańsk County in the Pomeranian Voivodeship.

In 1587 Sigismund III Vasa swore the pacta conventa in Oliwa prior to his coronation as King of Poland. In 1588, 1653 and 1709 Oliwa was hit by epidemics. During the Polish–Swedish War of 1626–1629, Oliwa was invaded by Sweden in 1626, and the Battle of Oliwa was fought nearby in 1627, considered one of the greatest victories in the history of the Polish Navy. Oliwa was invaded by Sweden once again in 1656, and the Swedish war against Poland ended with the Treaty of Oliwa signed in the village in 1660. Oliwa was devastated once again during the War of the Polish Succession in 1733–1734.

As a result of the First Partition of Poland in 1772 Oliwa became part of Prussia, at that time it was inhabited by about 500 people and counting approximately 70 buildings. The Prussians confiscated all of the Cistercian Monks' possessions. The abbey prior received a salary and the monastery received financial reparations. In 1804 Oliva became an administrative headquarters for the surrounding villages and the administrator settled in the former abbey gatehouse.

=== Modern history ===
Oliwa coat of arms

In 1807 the Napoleonic armies took the village over and set up a field hospital in the abbey. Napoleon stayed in one of the local estates. Oliva became part of the Free City of Danzig (Gdańsk) until 1813 when the Russians entered Oliva and once again used the abbey as a field hospital. In 1815 Oliwa was re-annexed by Prussia.

A period of relative calm ensued. In 1822 a paved road joining Oliva and Danzig (Gdańsk) was built. In 1831 the monastery was liquidated. The abbey became a Catholic parish and the former parish church was transferred to the local Evangelical Protestant community. The Oliva parish consisted of a number of small settlements from Zoppot (Sopot) to Danzig including today's boroughs of Wrzeszcz, Zaspa, Nowy Port, Wysoka and Rynarzewo. The Dom Bramny underwent renovation in 1836 so as to be able to function as a modern administrative center. Gustav Schilling was nominated as the first Vogt (administrator of a number of villages) in 1852.

In 1864 the villages of Polanki and Schwabenthal (Dolina Radości) became part of Oliva, which by then numbered approximately 2,000 inhabitants. In 1867 a new Vogt is nominated i.e. Herman Tümmler. During his term Oliva gained a rail connection with Danzig (Gdańsk) and Köslin (Koszalin) in 1870. In 1873 a local enterprise Quistrop established a horse drawn tramline. The line met its demise in 1879 because it was not very profitable. In 1874 Oliva community leader became Georg Czachowski. During his term a number of paved roads joining the township with surrounding settlements were built and the number of inhabitants surpassed 4,000. Between 1885 and 1907 Oliva was headed by a number of administrators and slowly expanded in all directions, not in the least due to the continuing efforts in improving the infrastructure. The present-day separate districts of Jelitkowo, Przymorze and Żabianka were incorporated by Oliva in 1907. Jelitkowo became a center of leisure with bathhouses and a wooden pier. In the same year a gas factory was built. In 1911 Oliva received running water, although a sewage system was not installed until 1921. By 1910 there were more than 9000 inhabitants.

In 1910 Oliva celebrated the 250th anniversary of the Treaty of Oliva. In 1911 a Catholic school was established at today's Cistercians' Street. The surrounding forest was enriched by a botanical garden in 1912. In 1913 another railway line was added, joining Oliva with the Kashubian town of Kościerzyna. After World War I and on the basis of the Treaty of Versailles the Free City of Danzig was established on November 15, 1920 under the protectorate of the League of Nations and Poland. The borders of the free city included Oliva; a part of the parish was however in Poland. In 1922, the former abbey church became a cathedral of a newly established Catholic diocese.

In 1921 Herbert Creutzburg was nominated as the mayor of Oliva. His term was disastrous. He wanted to open a casino styled on the Sopot casino (by then Sopot was a renowned seaside spa). He ruined the city funds and the losses amounted to 400,000 guilders. The losses were paid up by the city of Danzig which sped up the incorporation of Oliva by Danzig on July 1, 1926. The remainder of the twenties brought a lot of prosperity. A paint factory "Daol" and a chocolate factory "Anglas" were established. These still exist today, although under different names. The world-renowned Dr.Oetker company also established a factory in Oliva in the twenties. In 1926 a small Zoo and fur farm were established. The Zoo is today one of the largest in Poland. The most important event of 1926 were however the celebrations of the 750th anniversary of Oliwa. In 1927, a municipal museum was established at the monastery.

In the thirties the National-Socialist NSDAP was gaining strength in the free city. In 1930 the party numbered 500 in Danzig. In 1932 when Adolf Hitler made a stopover at the Zaspa airport he was greeted by 10,000 NSDAP members. In 1939 the square in front of the (then recently upgraded) Oliva cathedral was paved with granite slabs and was frequently used as a drill terrain for the Hitlerjugend. On August 23, 1939 Albert Forster was named head of state and took full control of the free city. A week later World War II started when the German cruiser Schleswig-Holstein attacked a small outpost on the Westerplatte. Polish activists including priests were arrested by the Germans who took over all the important control points and marched into Poland. Freie Stadt Danzig with Oliva, together with the Polish Pomeranian Voivodeship were annexed by Nazi Germany as Reichsgau Danzig-Westpreußen.

In March 1945 the advancing Red Army captured Oliwa and afterwards it became again part of Poland. During the postwar years Oliwa developed in tune with the rest of the city of Gdańsk.

The Kompleks Alchemia and Olivia Business Centre business parks are located in Oliwa.

== Education ==
The main campus of the University of Gdańsk is located in Oliwa.

== Transport ==
The Gdańsk Oliwa railway station is located in the district.

== See also ==
- Battle of Oliva
- Treaty of Oliva
- Olivia business centre
