= Żabianka =

- Neighbourhood of Gdańsk
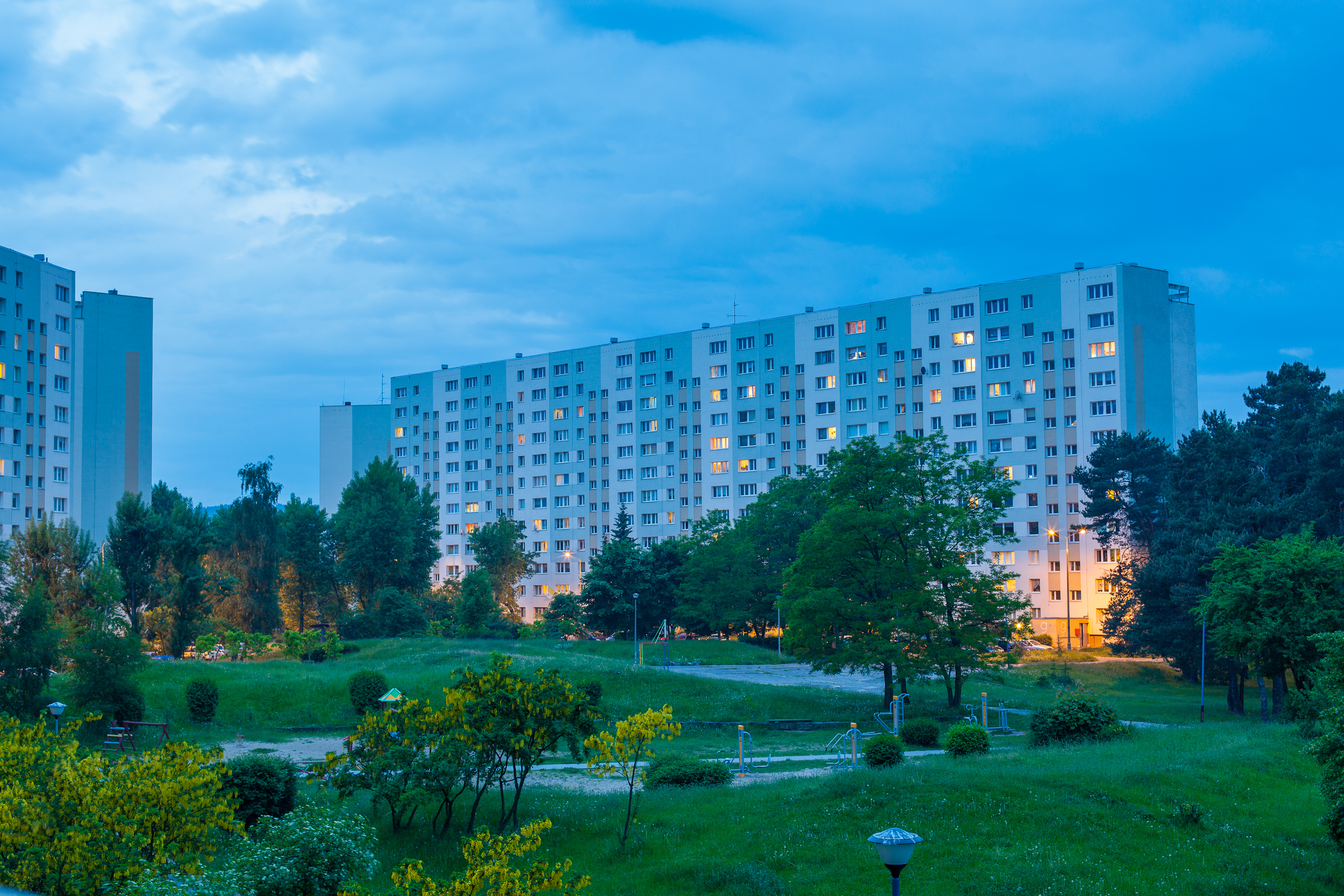
- Interactive map of Żabianka
- Coordinates: 54°25′14″N 18°34′30″E
- Country: Poland
- Voivodeship: Pomeranian
- County/City: Gdańsk
- District: Żabianka-Wejhera-Jelitkowo-Tysiąclecia
- Within city limits: 1926
- Time zone: UTC+1 (CET)
  - Summer (DST): UTC+2 (CEST)
- Vehicle registration: GD

Żabianka (Polish pronunciation: [ʐaˈbjaŋka]; Kashubian: Żabiónka; German: Poggenkrug) is a neighbourhood in the district of Żabianka-Wejhera-Jelitkowo-Tysiąclecia in the city of Gdańsk, Poland. It is located in the northern part of the city, on its border with Sopot.

Population: (together with Jelitkowo, Wejhera i Tysiaclecia) 23,145 inhabitants on area 2.1 km^{2} (population density 10,923 inhabitants/km^{2}).

== Transport ==
The Gdańsk Żabianka railway station, operated by SKM, is located in Żabianka.
