= Przymorze =

- Area of Gdańsk
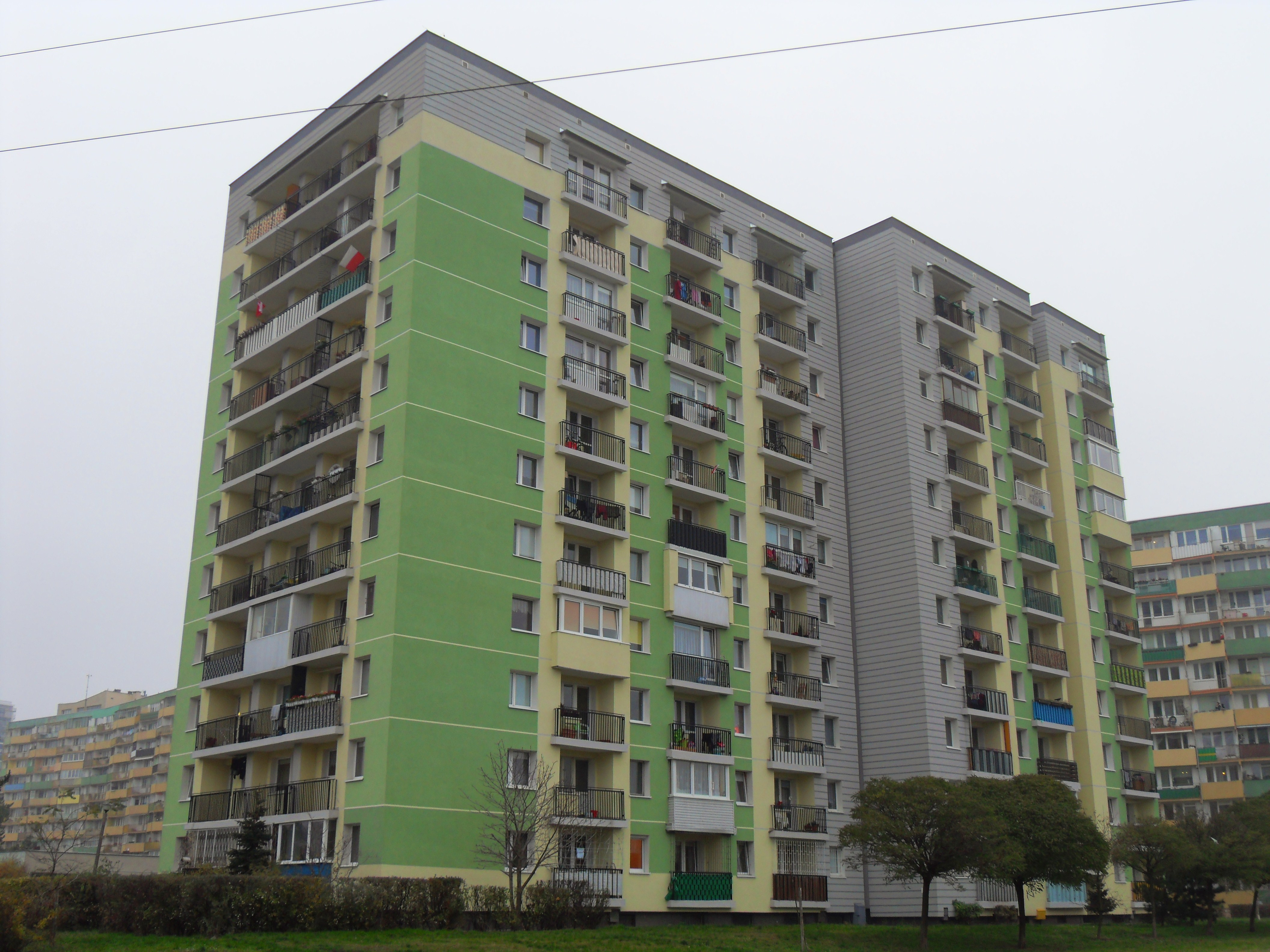
- Apartment block housing in Przymorze

- Location of Przymorze within Gdańsk
- Coordinates: 54°25′N 18°35′E
- Country: Poland
- Voivodeship: Pomeranian
- County/City: Gdańsk
- Time zone: UTC+1 (CET)
  - Summer (DST): UTC+2 (CEST)
- Vehicle registration: GD

Przymorze is an area of the city of Gdańsk and a former village. It is located in the city's northern half, and is administratively divided into 2 districts: Przymorze Małe and Przymorze Wielkie.

== Location ==
Przymorze borders Żabianka-Wejhera-Jelitkowo-Tysiąclecia to the north, Oliwa to the west, Zaspa-Młyniec to the south, Zaspa-Rozstaje to the south and east, and Brzeźno to the east.

== History ==
Przymorze was, at first, a small seaside village recorded as Primore in 1279 and Prsimore in 1283, owned by the Oliwa Abbey. However, it then disappeared from the historical record. Various villages appeared where it once stood, including Konradshammer and Burau; part of its terrain was also owned by Jelitkowo. It was sparsely inhabited and part of Oliwa, with which it became part of the city boundaries in 1926.

Przymorze Małe is primarily characterized by low- and mid-rise architecture, much of it constructed in the 1950s. In 1959, the Spółdzielnia Mieszkaniowa "Przymorze" was established to manage the large falowce buildings that would be built in Przymorze Wielkie in the 1960s, housing thousands of people. They became the districts' definitive defining characteristic. Park Ronalda Reagana (Ronald Reagan Park), named after the actor and American president, was opened in 1997.

== Gallery ==
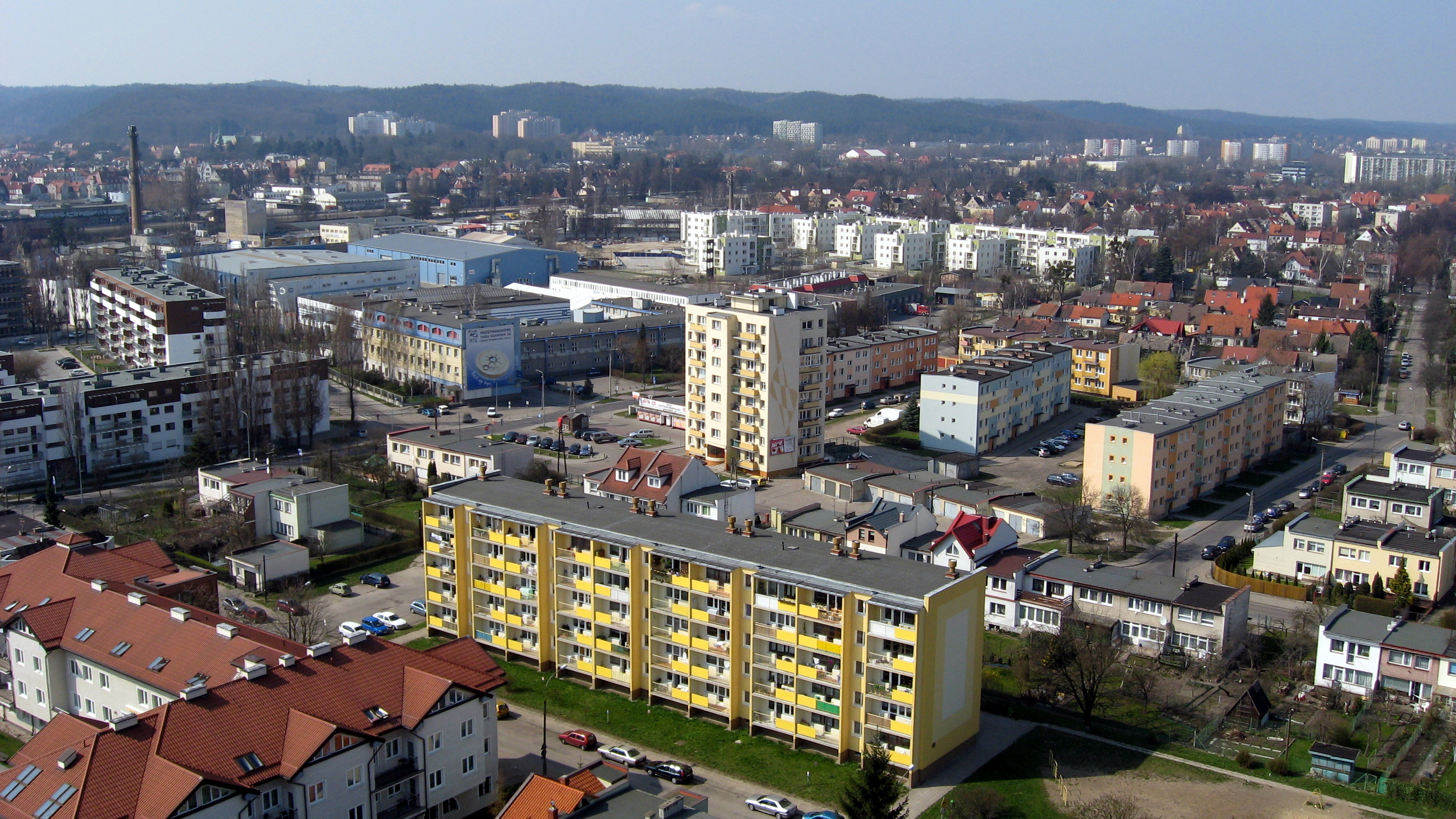
Low-rise housing in Przymorze Małe

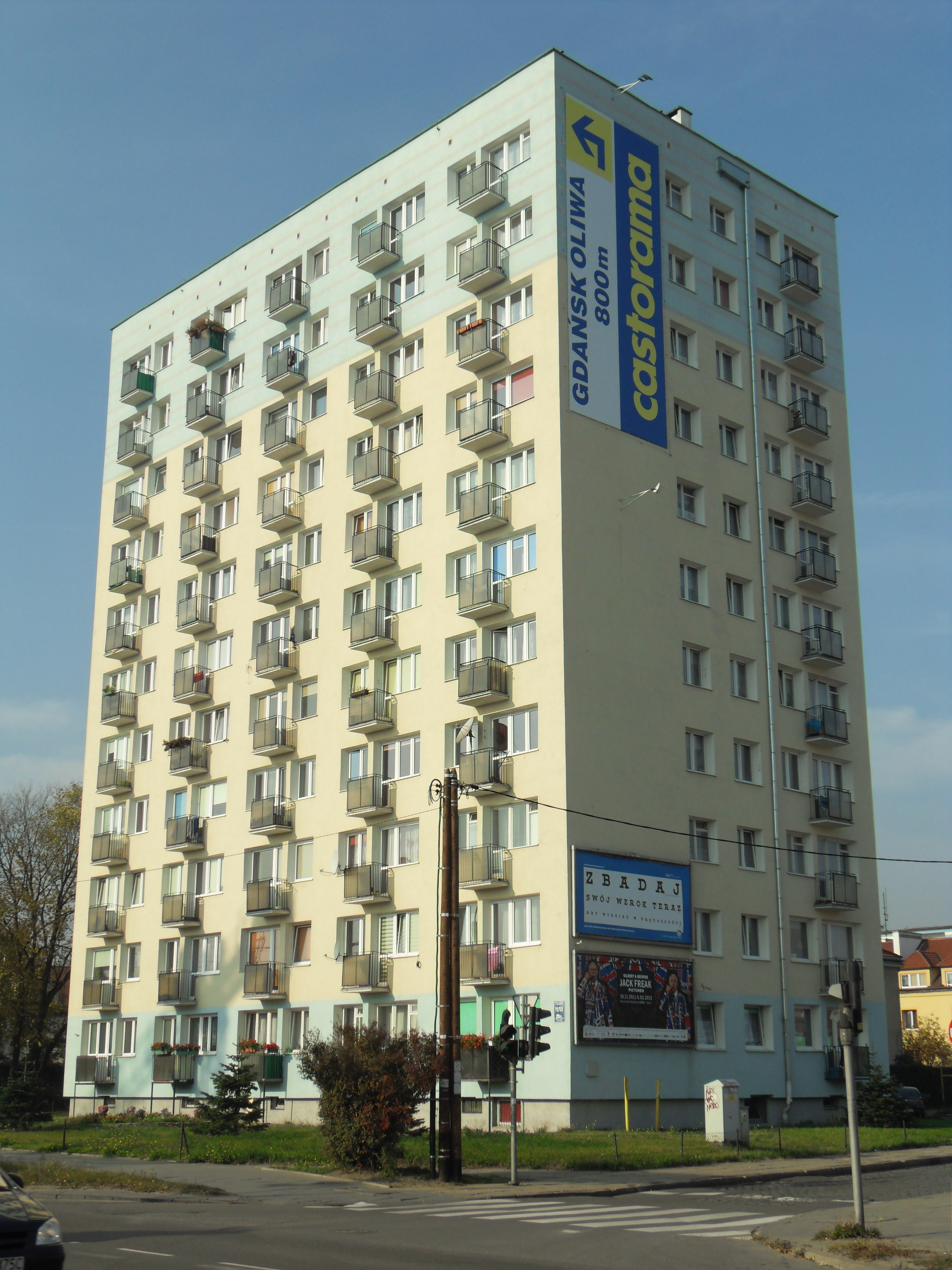
High-rises (not falowce)

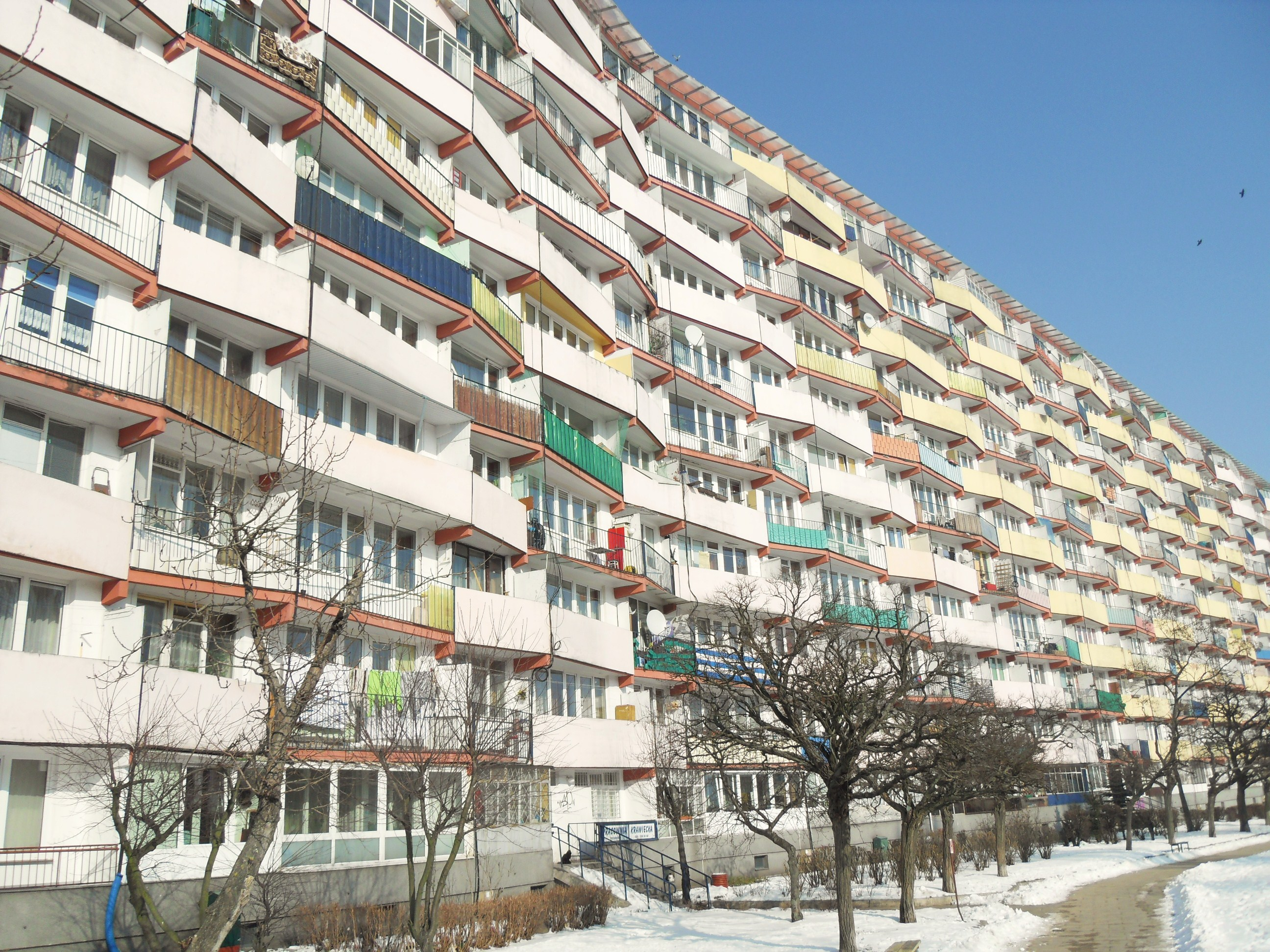
A falowiec

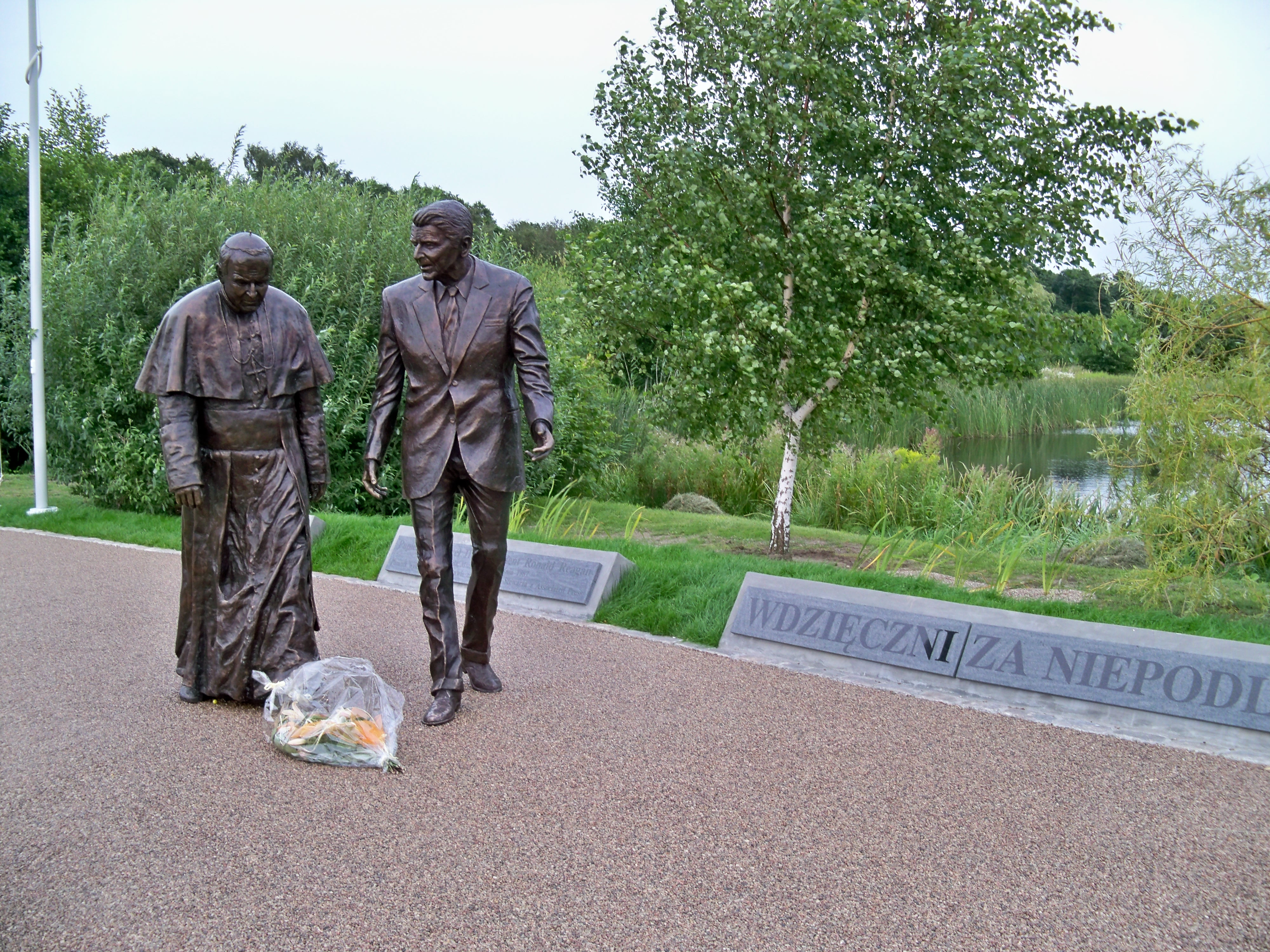
Monument of John Paul II and Ronald Reagan in Park Ronalda Reagana (Ronald Reagan Park)
