= Przymorze Wielkie =

Coordinates: 54.3667°N 18.6333°E

- District (dzielnica)
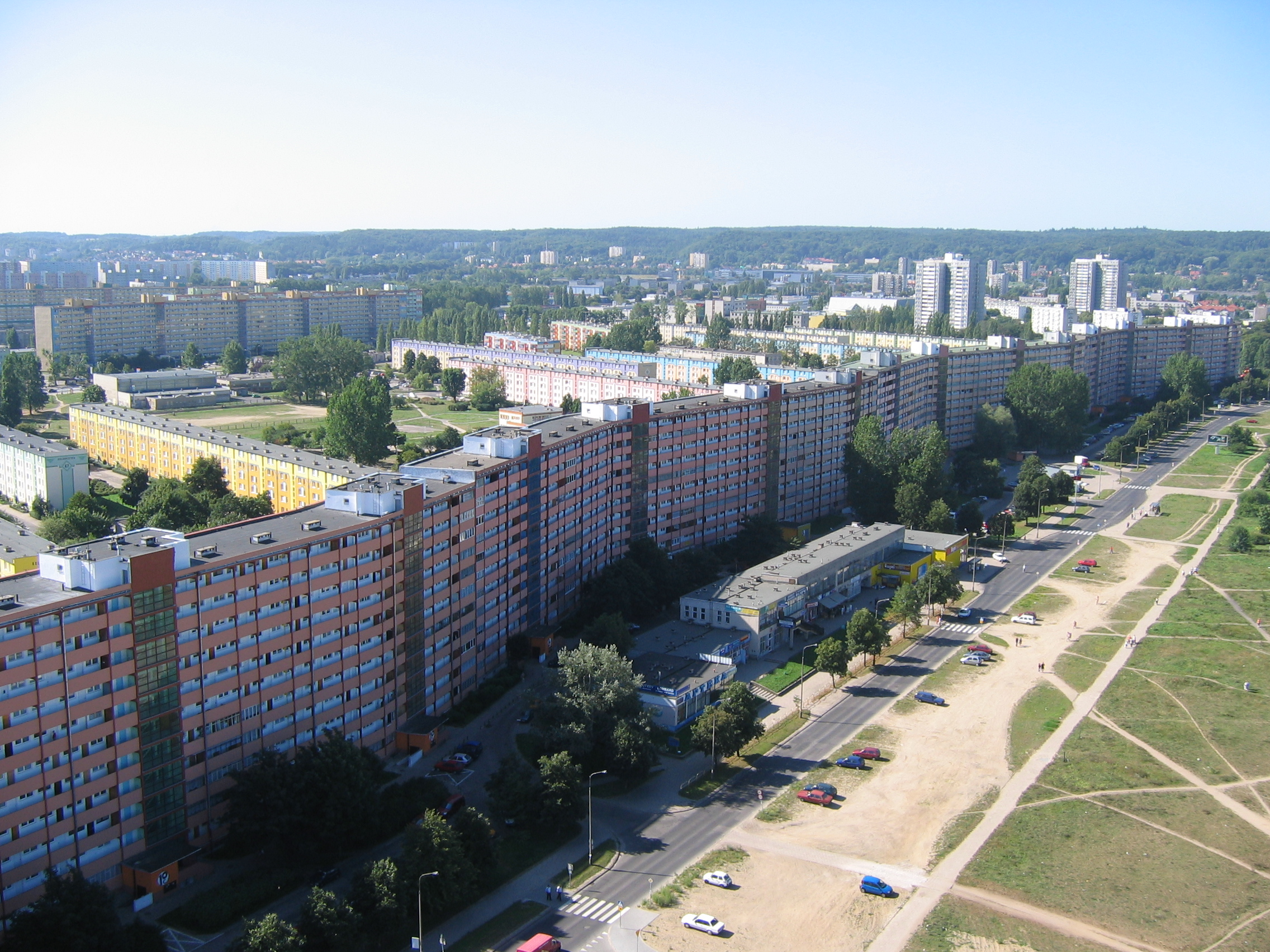
- Falowiec by Obrońców Wybrzeża Street

- Location of Przymorze Wilekie within Gdańsk
- Country: Poland
- Voivodeship: Pomeranian
- County/City: Gdańsk

Area
  - Total: 3.11 km^{2} (1.20 sq mi)

Population (2011)
  - Total: 30,346
  - Density: 9,760/km^{2} (25,300/sq mi)
- Time zone: UTC+1 (CET)
  - Summer (DST): UTC+2 (CEST)
- Postal code: 80-506; 80-528
- Area code: +48 58

Przymorze Wielkie is one of the districts of Gdańsk, located on the shore of the Baltic Sea.

== Location ==
Przymorze Wielkie borders Żabianka-Wejhera-Jelitkowo-Tysiąclecia to the north, Brzeźno to the east and south, Zaspa-Rozstaje to the south, and Przymorze Małe to the west. It consists of the quarters (osiedla) of Osiedle nr 1, Osiedle nr 2, Osiedle nr 3, Osiedle nr 4, and Osiedle Jelitkowski Dwór.

== History ==
For the broader history of the district and the surrounding area, see Przymorze § History. Its architecture mostly consists of large falowiec buildings, some of which are record-breakingly large and among the longest individual buildings in Europe. Most of them were built by the Spółdzielnia Mieszkaniowa "Przymorze" in the 1960s and house thousands of people. Alongside this development, Ronald Reagan Park (Park Ronalda Reagana) was opened in Przymorze Wielkie in 1997. Prior to that, the area was mostly rural and undeveloped.

== Gallery ==
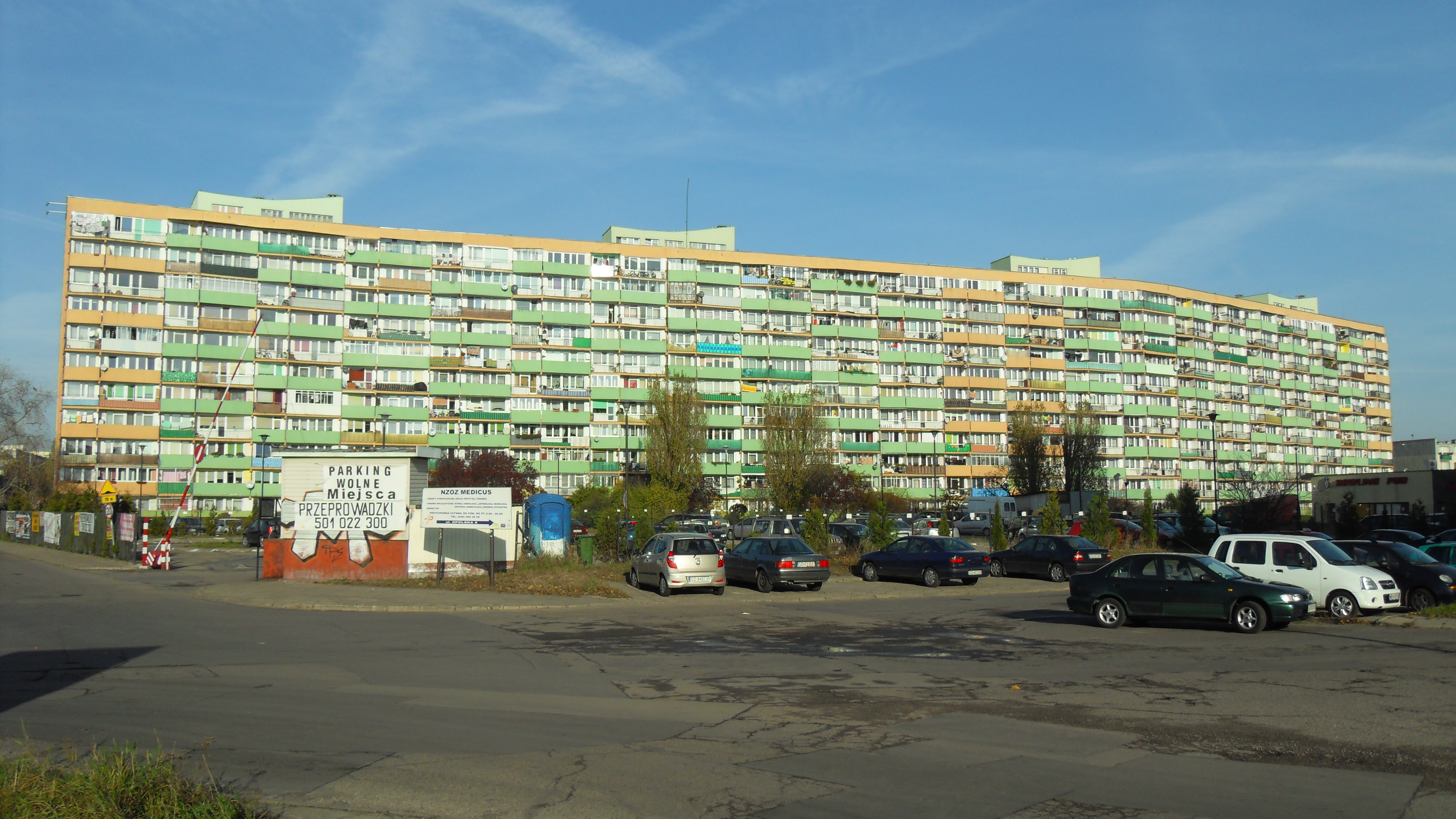
A smaller falowiec

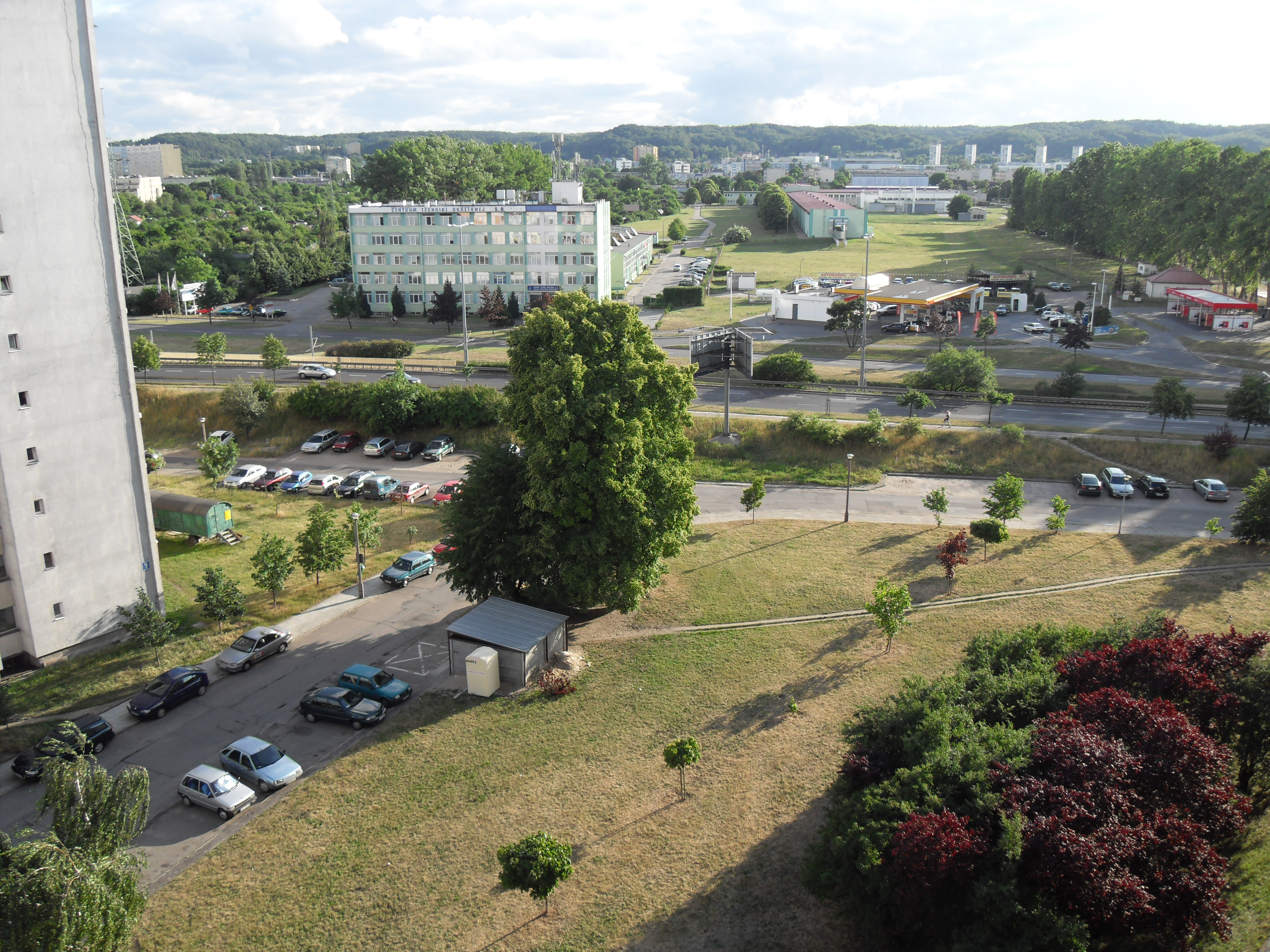
Sparsely-developed areas

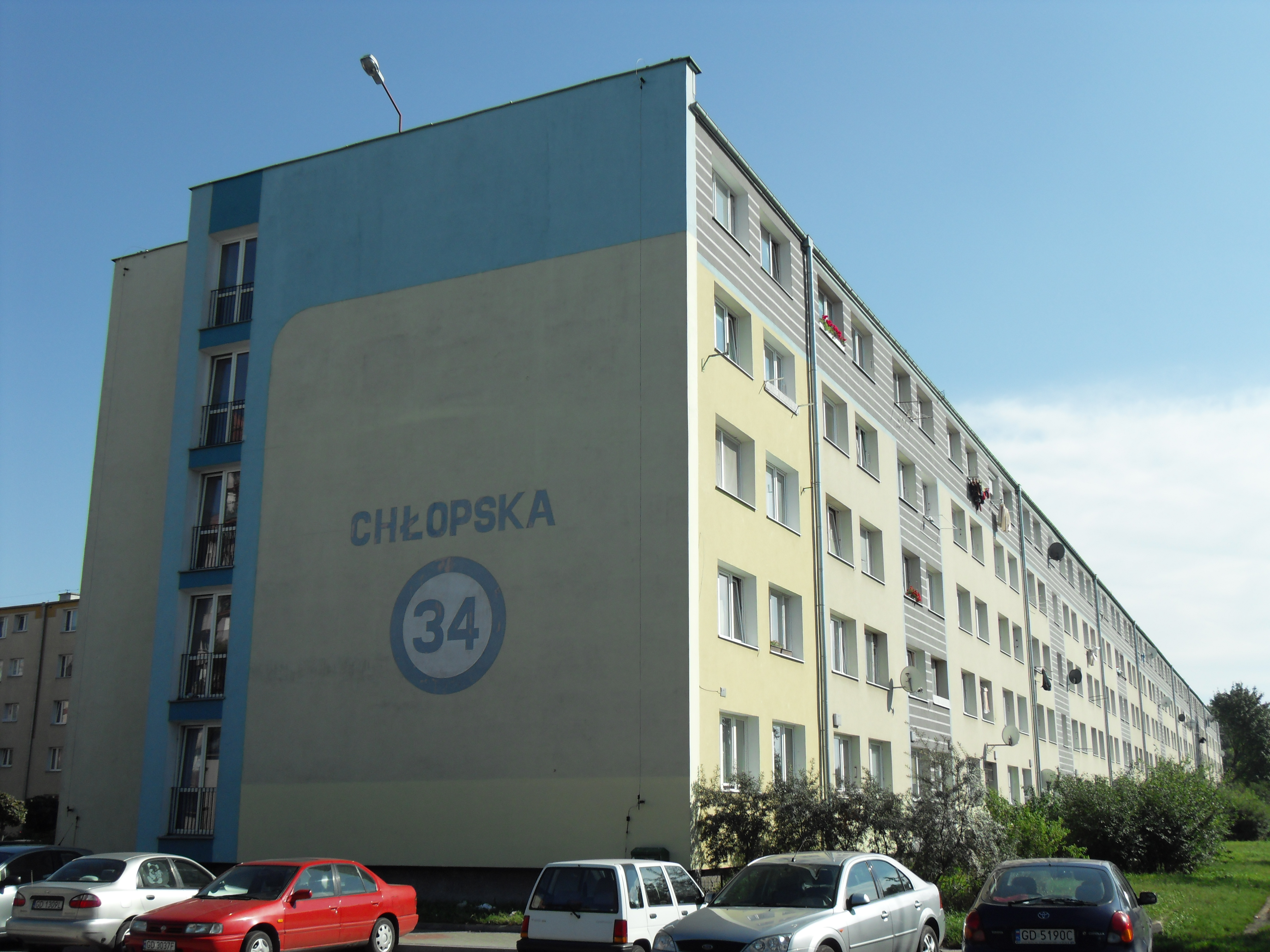
Mid-rise buildings

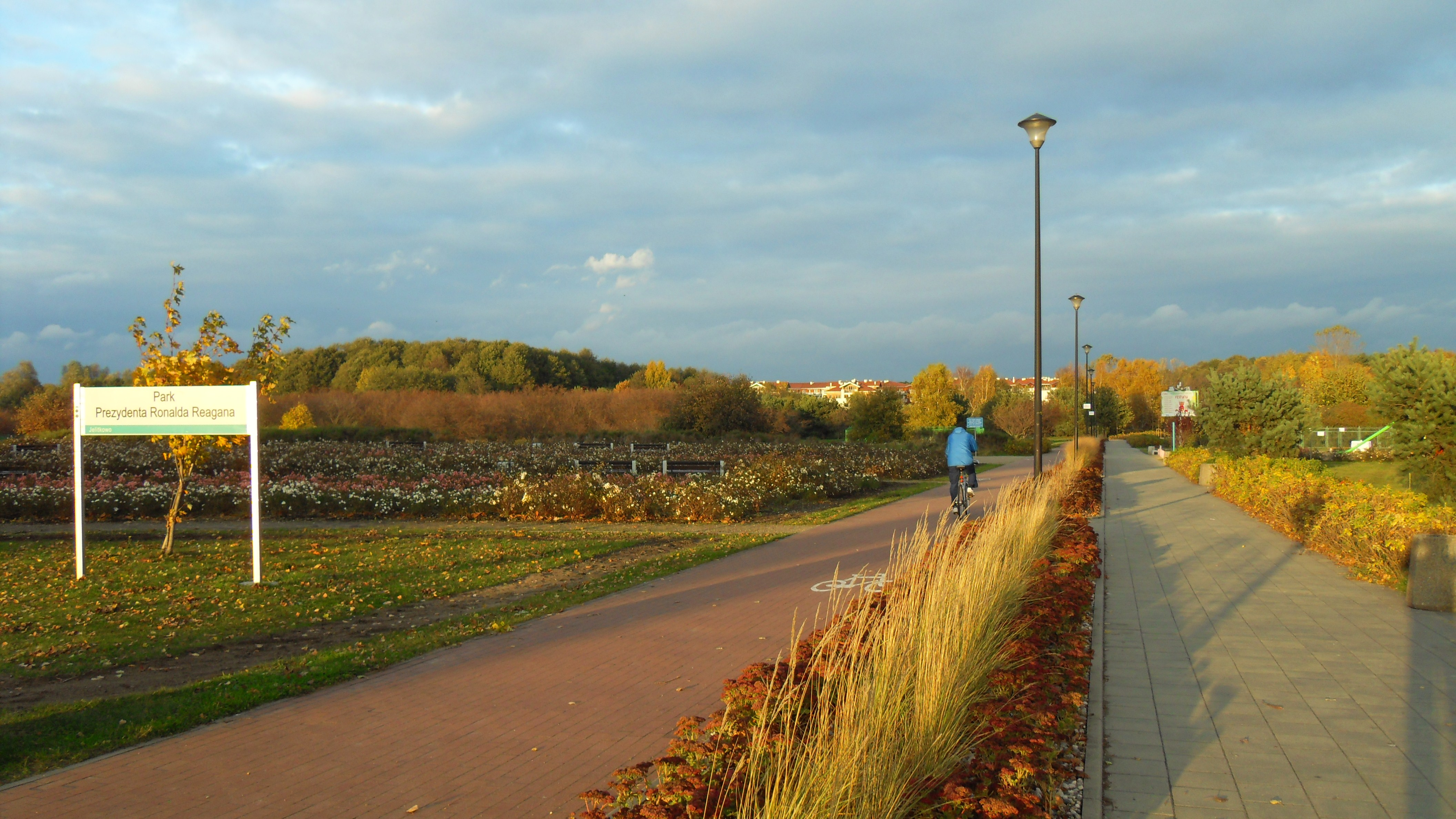
Ronald Reagan Park

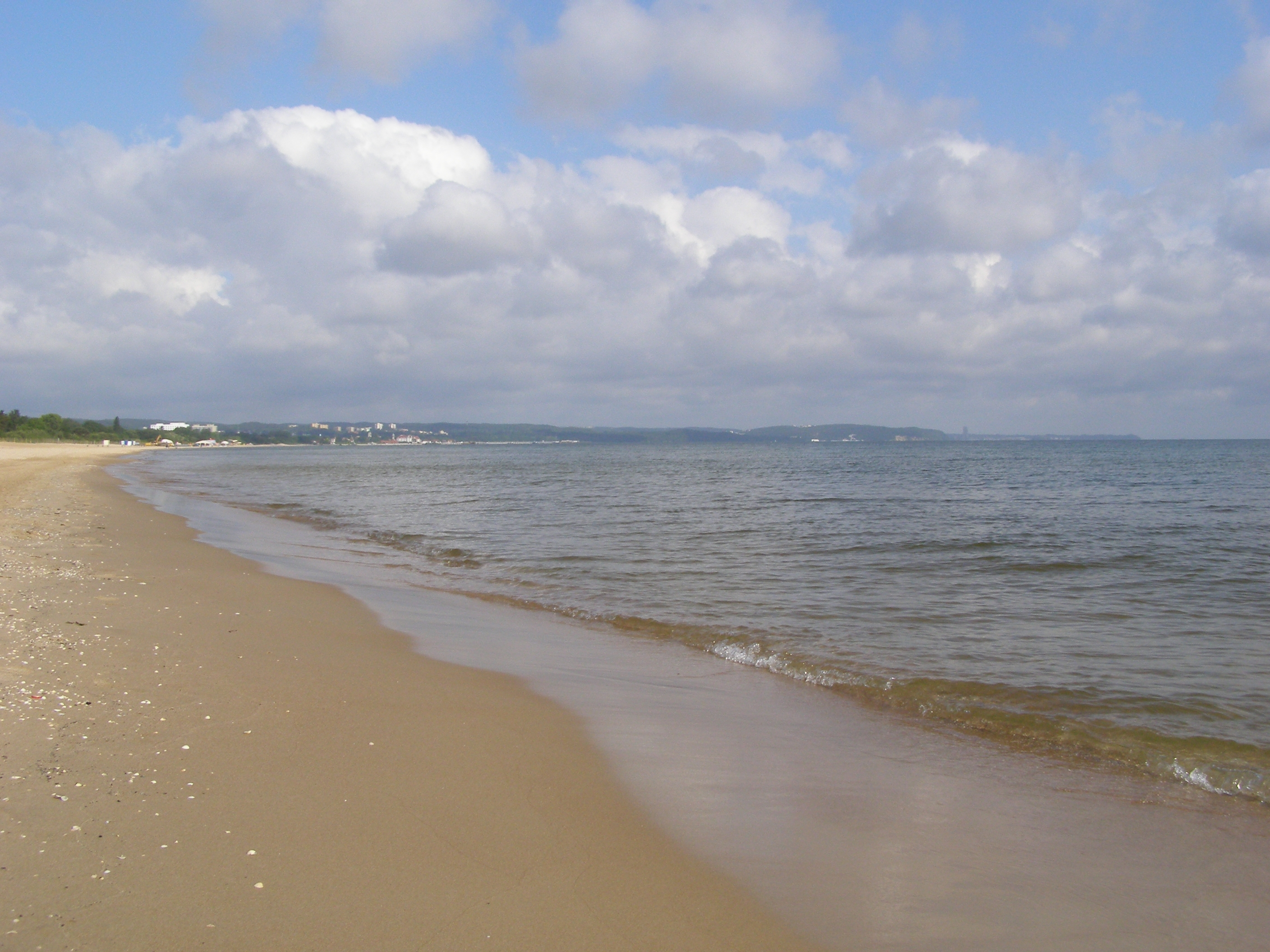
The beach in Przymorze Wielkie

== See also ==
- Przymorze
- Przymorze Małe
