= Ronald Reagan Parkway =

Highway in Georgia

Route information
- Maintained by Gwinnett County DOT
- Length: 7.3 mi (11.7 km)
- Existed: 1995–present

Major junctions
- West end: Pleasant Hill Road northeast of Lilburn
- US 29 / SR 8 northeast of Lilburn
- East end: SR 124 in Snellville

Location
- Country: United States
- State: Georgia
- Counties: Gwinnett

Highway system
- Georgia State Highway System; Interstate; US; State; Special

Ronald Reagan Parkway (RRP) is a controlled-access highway in northeastern Atlanta metropolitan area in the US state of Georgia. Its route is entirely within the south-central portion of Gwinnett County, connecting the Lilburn area with Snellville. It is named after Ronald Reagan, the 40th president. The highway project was initiated under the leadership of Gwinnett County chairman Wayne Mason in the mid-1990s.

== Route description ==
The parkway begins at an intersection with Pleasant Hill Road, northeast of Lilburn. It passes just north of Browne Lake and has an interchange with U.S. Route 29 (US 29) and State Route 8 (SR 8; Lawrenceville Highway). On the northeast side of Bethesda Park is an interchange with Bethesda Church Road, which partially travels through the park. After crossing the Yellow River, it curves southeast and has an interchange with Five Forks–Trickum Road. Then, it meets Webb Gin House Road SW and passes to the west of Eastside Medical Center. At Presidential Circle, the freeway portion ends, and the parkway continues southeast as an at-grade road. Approximately 1,000 feet (300 m) later, the parkway intersects SR 124 (Scenic Highway SW). Here, the roadway continues to the southeast as Pinehurst Road SW.

All of Ronald Reagan Parkway is included as part of the National Highway System, a system of roadways important to the nation's economy, defense, and mobility.

== History ==
The parkway was established in 1995 along the same alignment it runs today. For a short period of time, the parkway had an unsigned designation of State Route 864 (SR 864), even though it is considered a county road.

In 2009, new plans were developed to extend Ronald Reagan Parkway as a toll road to directly connect with I-85. On June 23, 2009, Gwinnett County voted to approve a partnership with a private firm to study extending the Ronald Reagan Parkway to I-85. The study cost $1.4 million and was funded by the County. The plans were abandoned in February 2013 due to public concerns about tolls, potential traffic and the road path.

== Exit list ==
The entire route is in Gwinnett County. All exits are unnumbered.

Location	mi	km	Destinations	Notes
	0.0	0.0	Pleasant Hill Road north to I-85 – Duluth, Atlanta, Greenville	Western terminus; westbound exit and eastbound entrance; no access from Pleasant Hill Road north to Ronald Reagan Parkway or from Ronald Reagan Parkway to Pleasant Hill Road south
	0.8	1.3	US 29 / SR 8 (Lawrenceville Highway) – Lilburn, Lawrenceville	
	1.8	2.9	Bethesda Church Road – Bethesda Park	
	4.0	6.4	Five Forks–Trickum Road – Five Forks	
	5.3	8.5	Webb Gin House Road – Brookwood High School, The Shoppes at Webb Gin	
Snellville	7.1	11.4	Presidential Circle	Freeway ends; roadway continues at-grade
Snellville	7.3	11.7	SR 124 (Scenic Highway SW) / Pinehurst Road SW east – Lithonia, Lawrenceville	Eastern terminus; roadway continues as Pinehurst Road SW
1.000 mi = 1.609 km; 1.000 km = 0.621 mi: Incomplete access
