= Reagan Day =

Reagan Day can refer to:

- Ronald Reagan Day, a day in California to commemorate Governor Ronald Reagan
- Reagan Day Dinner (or Reagan Dinner, Lincoln–Reagan Dinner, etc.), an annual fundraising event for the Republican Party
