= Mountain Park, Georgia =

Mountain Park is the name of two places in the U.S. state of Georgia:

- Mountain Park, Fulton County, Georgia, an incorporated city
- Mountain Park, Gwinnett County, Georgia, an unincorporated community
