= Statue of Johannes Hevelius (Zgody Street, Gdańsk) =

Monument in Gdańsk, Poland

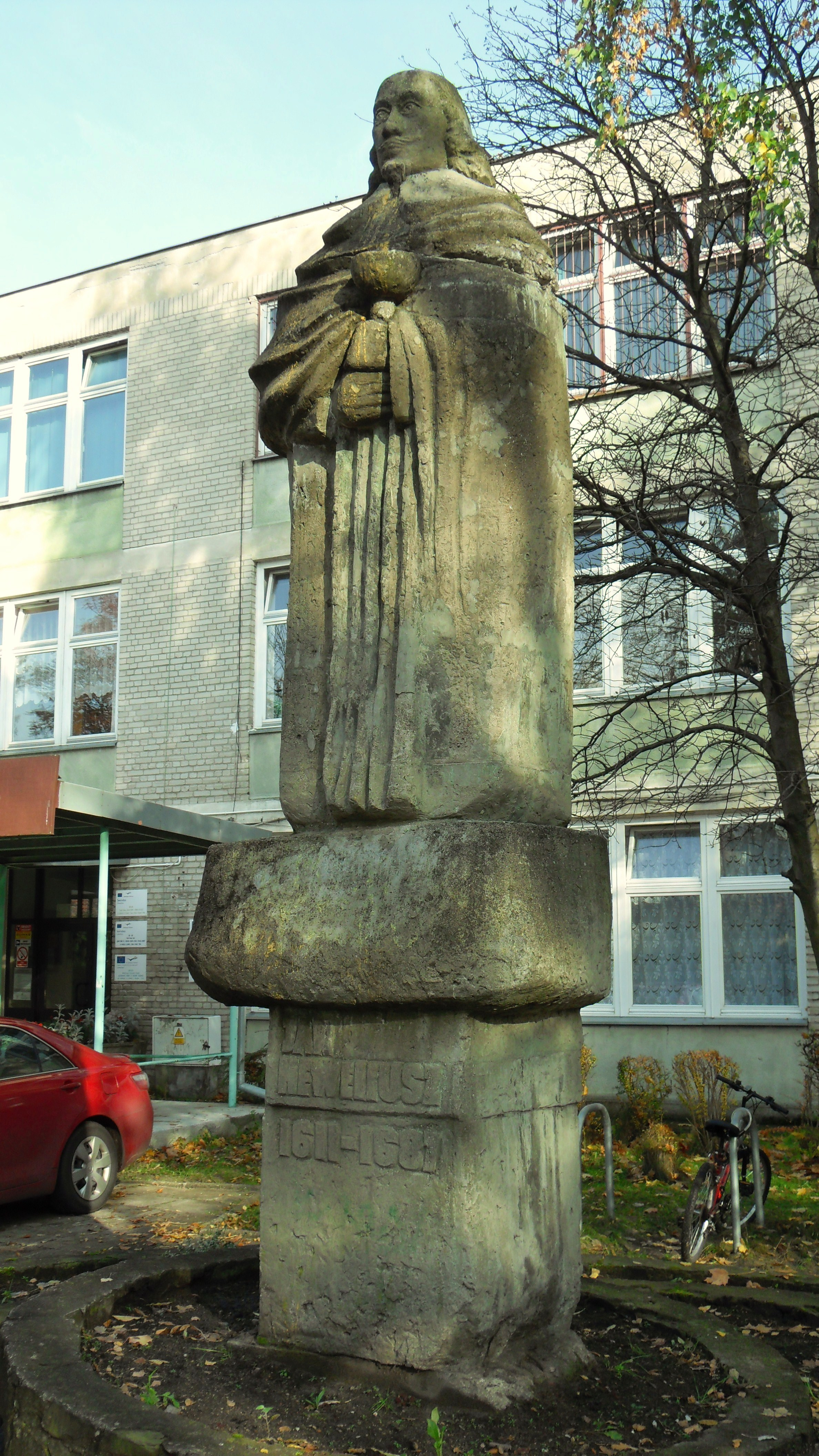
- The monument in 2013.
- Interactive map of Statue of Johannes Hevelius
- Location: 6 Zgody Street, Przymorze Małe, Gdańsk, Poland
- Coordinates: 54.408120°N 18.583792°E
- Designer: Wiesław Pietroń
- Type: Statue
- Material: Granite
- Height: c. 2.5 m
- Opening date: 12 May 1973
- Dedicated to: Johannes Hevelius

The statue of Johannes Hevelius (Polish: Pomnik Jana Heweliusza) is a monument in Gdańsk, Poland, placed at in front of the Specialist School Complex no. 2, at 6 Zgody Street, within the Przymorze Małe district. The granite statue is dedicated to Johannes Hevelius, a 17th-century astronomer considered as the founder of selenography, and a politician who was the councillor and mayor of Gdańsk The monument was designed by Wiesław Pietroń, and unveiled on 12 May 1973.

== History ==
The monument was designed by Wiesław Pietroń, and unveiled on 12 May 1973, as part of the celebration of naming the Primary School no. 71 in honour of Johannes Hevelius. In 2001, it became the Specialist School Complex no. 2.

== Overview ==
The monument is made from granite, and consists of a life-sized statue of Johannes Hevelius, dressed in robes and holding an optical telescope, placed on top of a small pedestal. It bears an inscription which reads "Heweliusz [Hevelius]; 1611–1687". It is around 2.5 metres tall. The monument is placed in front of the Specialist School Complex no. 2, at 6 Zgody Street, within the Przymorze Małe district.
