= Statue of Ronald Reagan =

Statue of Ronald Reagan may refer to:

- Statue of Ronald Reagan (Arlington, Virginia), U.S.
- Statue of Ronald Reagan, Budapest
- Statue of Ronald Reagan (U.S. Capitol), Washington, D.C.
