= Mount Clay =

Mountain in New Hampshire, United States

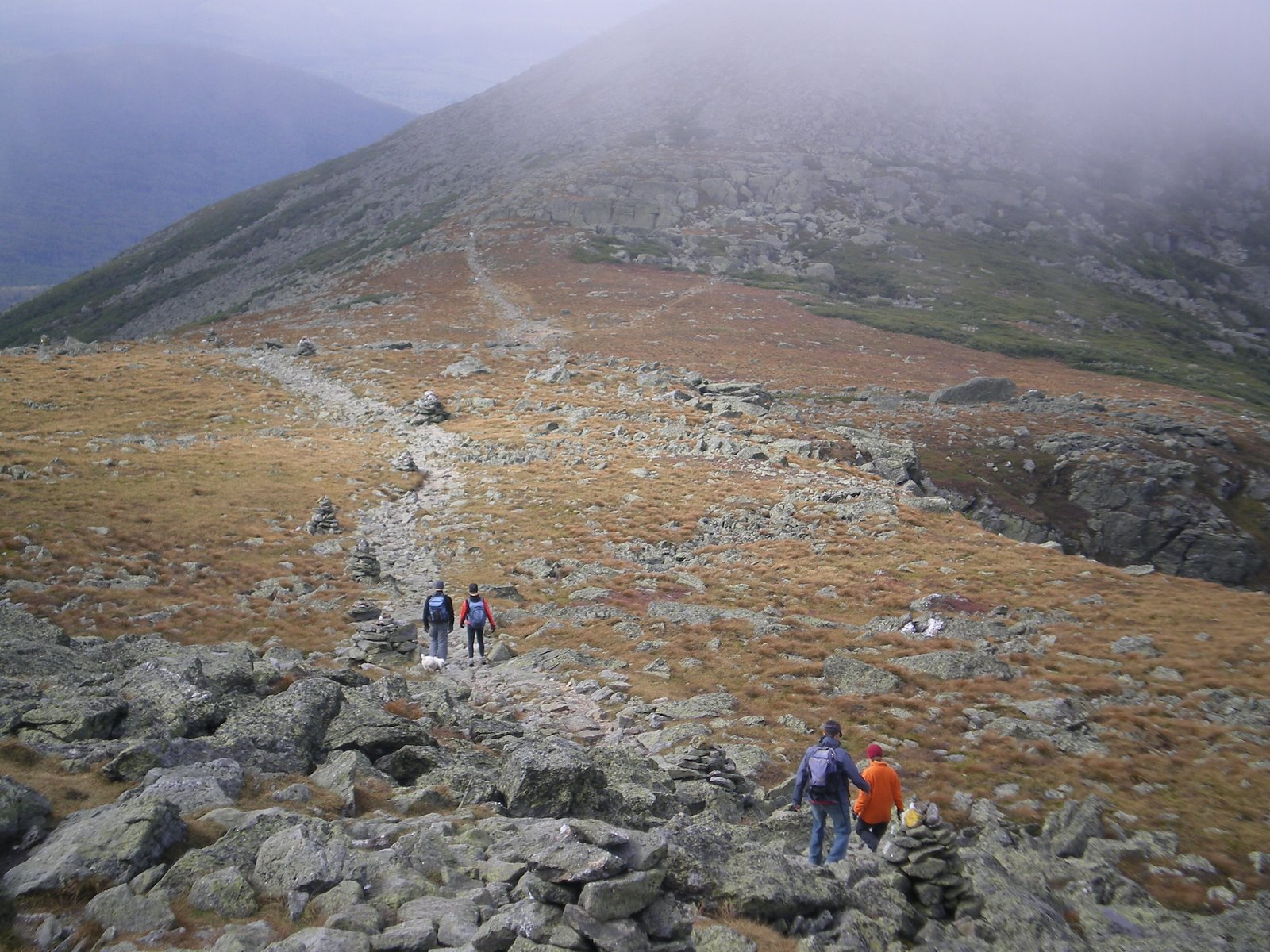
- The saddle between Mount Washington and Mount Clay

Highest point
- Elevation: 5,533 ft (1,686 m)
- Prominence: 150 ft (46 m)
- Parent peak: Mount Washington
- Coordinates: 44°17.11′N 71°18.95′W

Geography
- Country: United States
- State: New Hampshire
- District: Coos County
- Subdivision: Thompson and Meserve's Purchase
- Parent range: Presidential Range
- Topo map: USGS Mount Washington

Climbing
- Easiest route: Hike

Mount Clay is a peak located in Thompson and Meserve's Purchase in Coos County in the Presidential Range of the White Mountains of New Hampshire. It is a rise about 0.9-mile (1.4 km) long and a few hundred feet tall, with summit elevation of 5,533 feet (1,686 m); it lies on the ridge joining the summits of Mount Washington, about 0.9-mile (1.4 km) to the south-southeast, with that of Mount Jefferson, about 1.3-mile (2.1 km) north.

The Appalachian Trail, coinciding there with the Gulfside Trail, rises about a hundred feet approaching it northbound, and passes 0.1-mile (0.16 km) from the summit, 200 feet (61 m) below it. The 1.2-mile (1.9 km) Mt. Clay Loop passes over the summit. The Jewell Trail is a popular choice as a relatively less strenuous route to Mt. Washington's summit; hikers ascending it, eastbound, from the vicinity of the cog rail base station join the Gulfside Trail about 0.4-mile (0.64 km) from Clay's summit and about 200 feet (61 m) below, and give up about 100 feet (30 m) in descending the southern tail of Clay, before resuming the ascent of Washington.

The mountain is named for Henry Clay, 19th-century senator and U.S. Secretary of State from Kentucky, known as "The Great Compromiser". In 2003, the New Hampshire state legislature, participating in a Reagan Legacy project, made it state law that Mt. Clay "shall hereafter be called and known as Mount Reagan," after President Ronald Reagan. The legal force of this is limited to actions by the state of New Hampshire. The U.S. Board on Geographic Names (BGN) voted in May 2010 not to change the name of the mountain. Maps used in connection with foot travel in the Presidentials are typically published by the U.S. Geological Survey (which adheres by law to BGN's naming), and by the Appalachian Mountain Club and two New England companies, all three of whom as of 2010 use "Clay" and make no mention of "Reagan".

Although well over 4,000 feet (1,200 m) in height above sea level, the Appalachian Mountain Club does not consider Mount Clay a "four-thousand footer" because it stands less than 200 feet (61 m) above the col on the ridge from Washington, making it a secondary summit of that peak.
