= Ronald Reagan Day =

Holiday celebrating Ronald Reagan

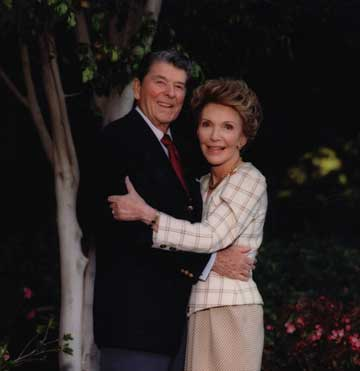
- Ronald and Nancy Reagan in California after leaving the White House
- Observed by: California, Wisconsin
- Date: February 6
- Frequency: Annual

Ronald Reagan Day is a day of recognition that occurs every February 6, starting in 2011, in the state of California for Ronald Reagan, who was that state's governor from 1967 to 1975 and President of the United States from 1981 to 1989.

Ronald Reagan Day has also been declared a state holiday in Wisconsin and Mississippi. For the 100th anniversary of Reagan's birthday in 2011, governors in 21 states issued proclamations designating February 6 Ronald Reagan Day. In 2013, 40 governors issued proclamations declaring Ronald Reagan Day in their respective states.

== History ==
As Reagan was the 33rd Governor of California and that state's only governor to become President of the United States, several of his successors proclaimed February 6 as Ronald Reagan Day in California in his honor. Governor Gray Davis, a Democrat, proclaimed February 6 "Ronald Reagan Day" in both 2002 and 2003. Davis's Republican successor, Arnold Schwarzenegger, proclaimed February 6 Ronald Reagan Day in 2004, 2005, 2006, 2007, 2008, 2009, and 2010.

Senator George Runner introduced Senate Bill 944 on February 3, 2010. The bill passed the Senate Education Committee on March 24, 2010, by a 7–0 vote. SB 944 was approved by the full Senate on April 8, 2010, by a 34–0 vote.

After its approval in the Senate, SB 944 was sent to the Legislature's lower house, where the bill passed the Assembly Education Committee on June 16, 2010, by a 5–1 vote. The bill was approved by the full Assembly on June 28, 2010, by a 66–0 vote.

On July 19, 2010, Governor Arnold Schwarzenegger signed SB 944 into law, making Ronald Reagan Day a permanent day of special significance in California. The bill declared the first Ronald Reagan Day to be February 6, 2011—Reagan's 100th birthday. The day is not a state holiday but is to be marked by public schools with "exercises remembering the life of Ronald Reagan, recognizing his accomplishments, and familiarizing pupils with the contributions he made to California."

Schwarzenegger's immediate successor, Jerry Brown (who was, coincidentally, Reagan's immediate successor as Governor 36 years beforehand, and who was also the son of Pat Brown, whom Reagan defeated in the 1966 election to become governor), proclaimed Ronald Reagan Day in 2011, as obligated by SB 944.

== Legislative history ==
Session	Short title	Bill number	Date introduced	Senate	Assembly	Governor	Lead author	Joint author	Principal co-author	Co-authors
2009–10	Ronald Reagan Day	SB 944	February 3, 2010	Passed the Senate 34-0	Passed the Assembly 66-0	Signed into Law by the Governor on July 19, 2010	Senator George Runner	Senator Tony Strickland	Assembly Member Audra Strickland	Senators Roy Ashburn, Dave Cogdill, Dave Cox, Jeff Denham, Robert Dutton, Tom Harman, Dennis Hollingsworth, and Mark Wyland; Assembly Members Joel Anderson, Bill Berryhill, Connie Conway, Jean Fuller, Ted Gaines, Danny Gilmore, Kevin Jeffries, Dan Logue, Jeff Miller, Brian Nestande, Roger Niello, Jim Nielsen, Jim Silva, Cameron Smyth, and Van Tran

== See also ==
- List of honors named for Ronald Reagan
- Ronald Reagan Legacy Project
- Ronald Reagan Presidential Library
- Margaret Thatcher Day
