= Ronald Reagan Park, Gdańsk =

Park in Gdańsk, Poland

Coordinates: 54°24′48″N 18°36′41″E

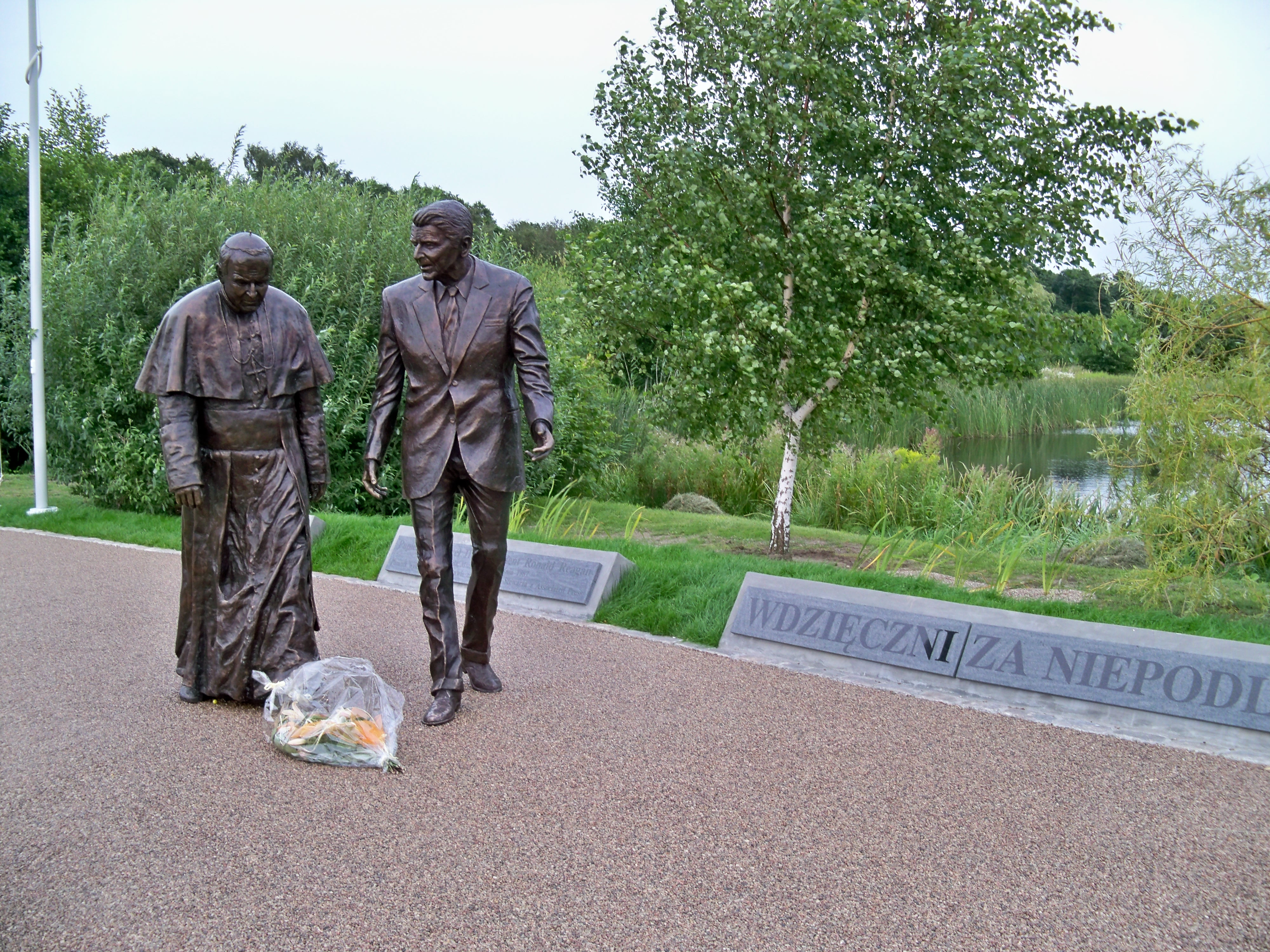
Statues of Ronald Reagan and Pope John Paul II.

The Ronald Reagan Park (Polish: Park imienia Ronalda Reagana) is located in the neighborhood of Przymorze Wielkie, Gdańsk, Poland.

Built between 2003 and 2006 out of formerly barren lands, it covers 40 hectares. It honors President Ronald Reagan, who was considered instrumental in the fall of Communism in Poland, along with Pope John Paul II.

== See also ==
- List of things named after Ronald Reagan
- List of buildings and monuments honoring presidents of the United States in other countries
