= Przymorze Małe =

City district of Gdańsk, Poland

Coordinates: 54°24′02″N 18°34′36″E

- District (dzielnica)
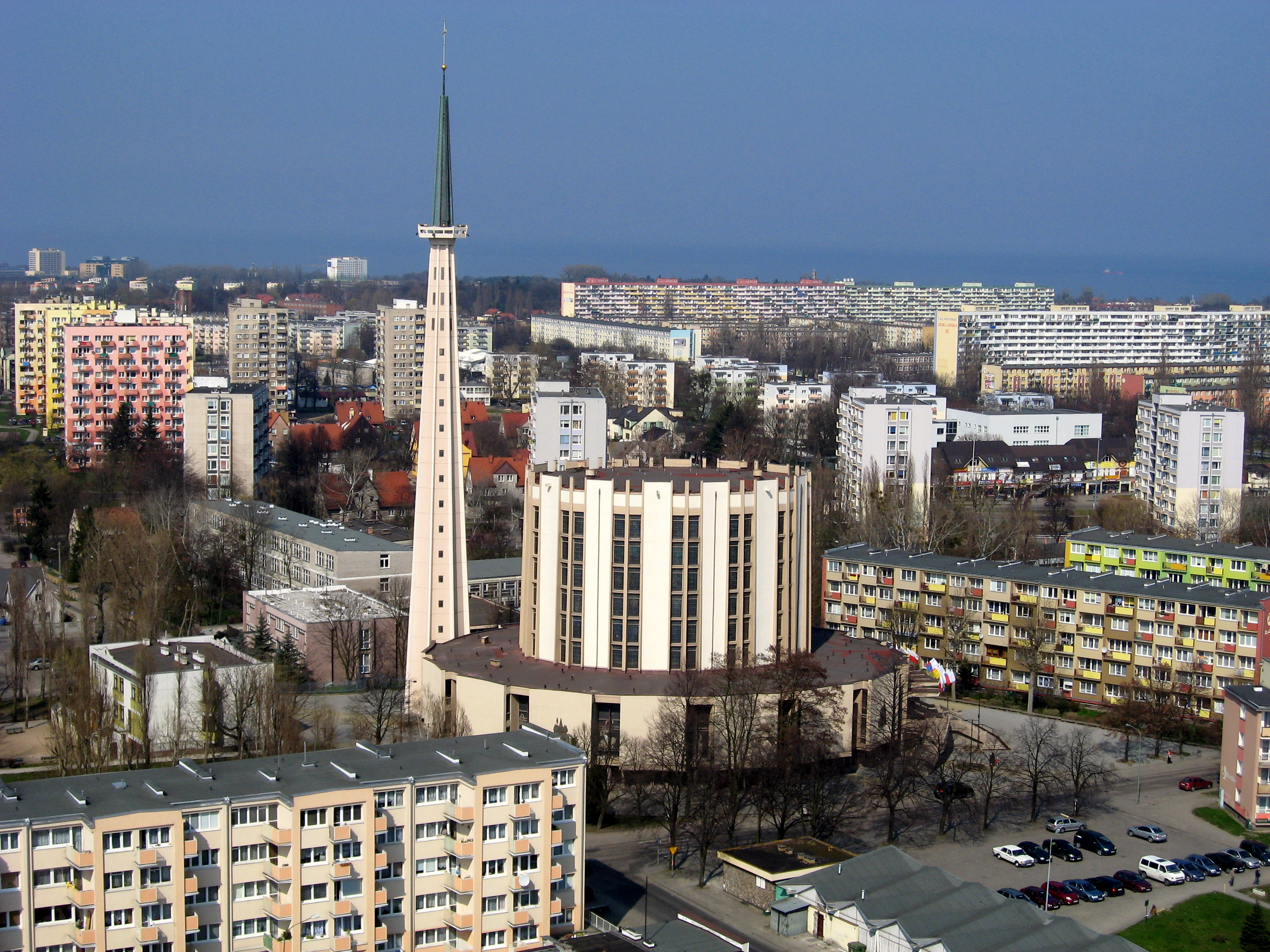
- The "Round Church" in Przymorze Małe

- Location of Przymorze Małe within Gdańsk
- Country: Poland
- Voivodeship: Pomeranian
- City: Gdańsk

Area
  - Total: 2.27 km^{2} (0.88 sq mi)

Population
  - Total: 14,912
  - Density: 6,570/km^{2} (17,000/sq mi)

Przymorze Małe is one of the districts of the city of Gdańsk, Poland. It is one of the two districts that comprises the Przymorze area, alongside Przymorze Wielkie.

== Location ==
Przymorze Małe borders Żabianka-Wejhera-Jelitkowo-Tysiąclecia to the north, Przymorze Wielkie and Zaspa-Rozstaje to the east, Zaspa-Młyniec to the south, and Oliwa to the west. It is not divided into any quarters (osiedla).

== History ==
For the broader history of the area, see Przymorze § History. Primarily built up in the 1950s, today, Przymorze Małe is characterized by low- and mid-rise block housing, although much taller residential buildings are present near its northwestern edges, near Przymorze Wielkie.

== Gallery ==
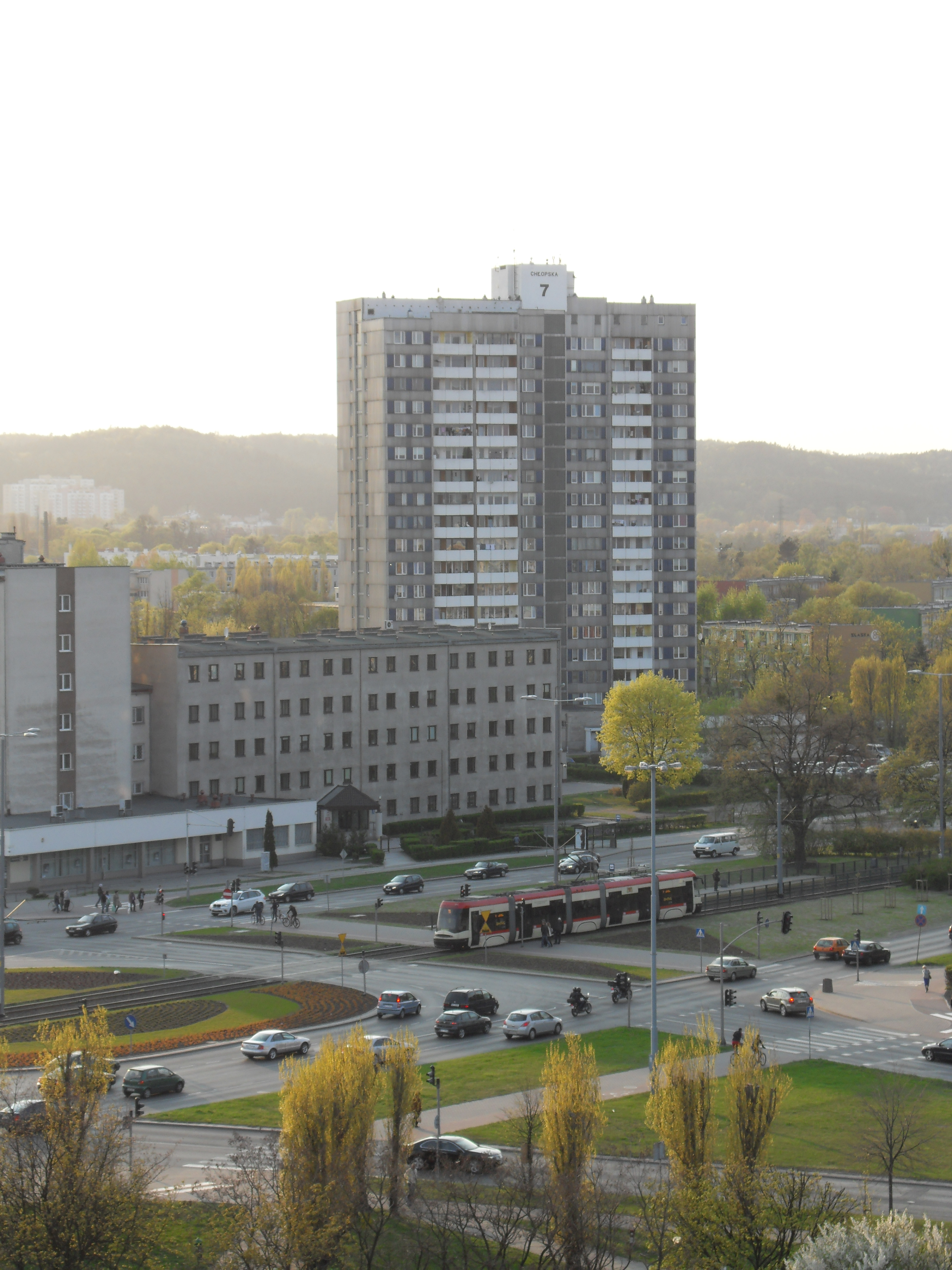
Tall residential buildings in Przymorze Małe

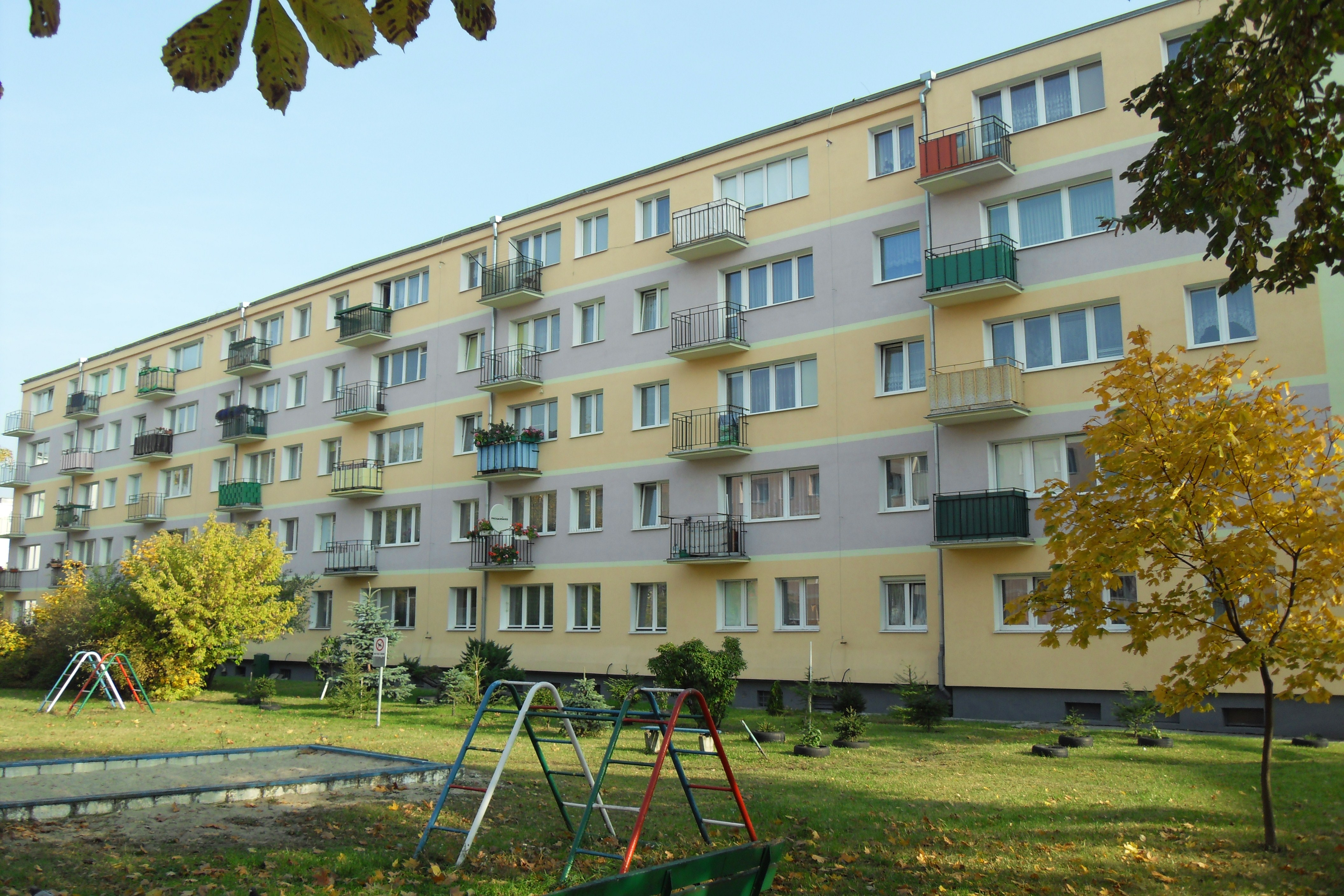
Mid-rise architecture

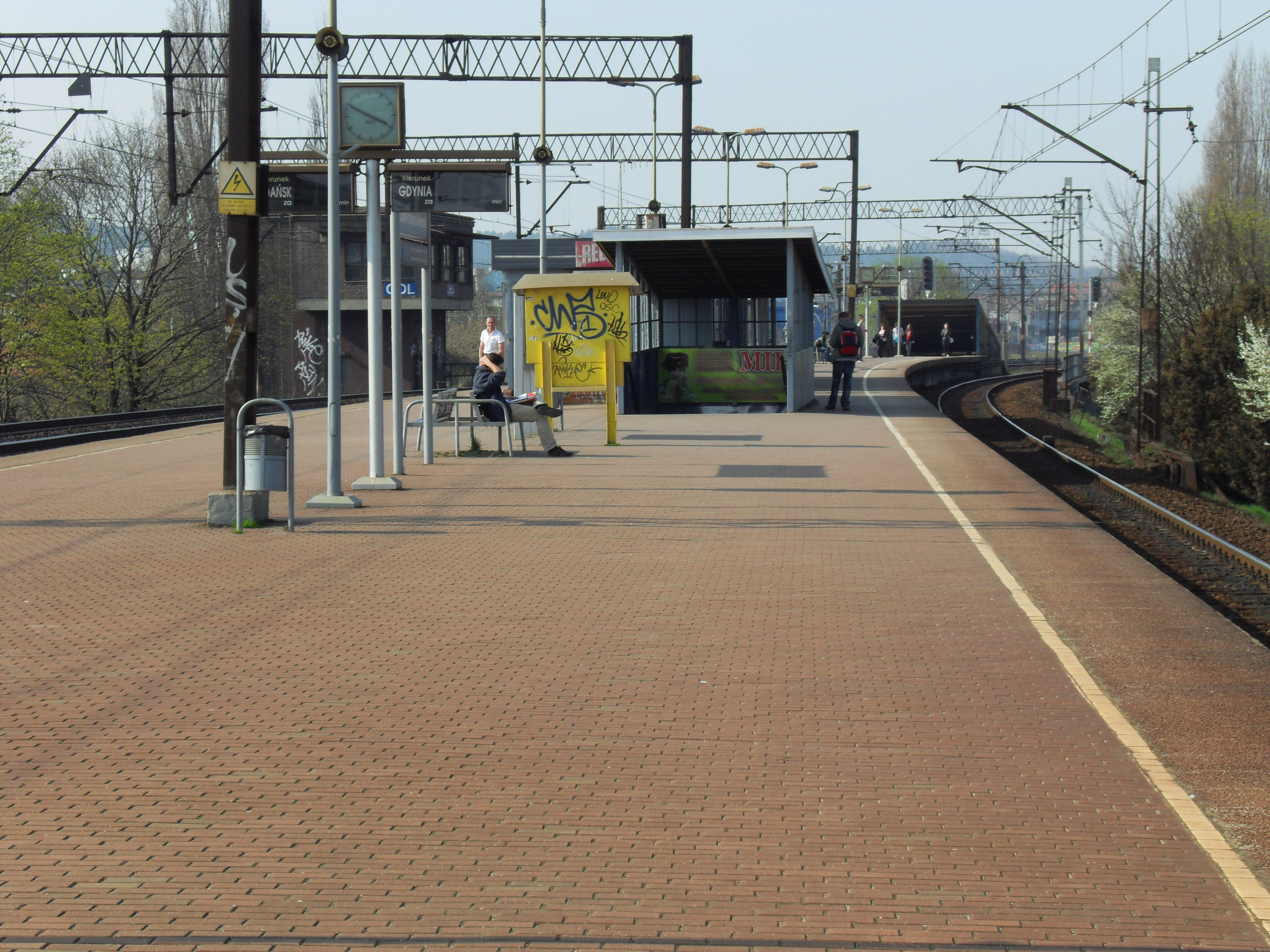
Gdańsk Przymorze-Uniwersytet railway station
