= The Shoppes at Webb Gin =

Shopping mall in Georgia, USA

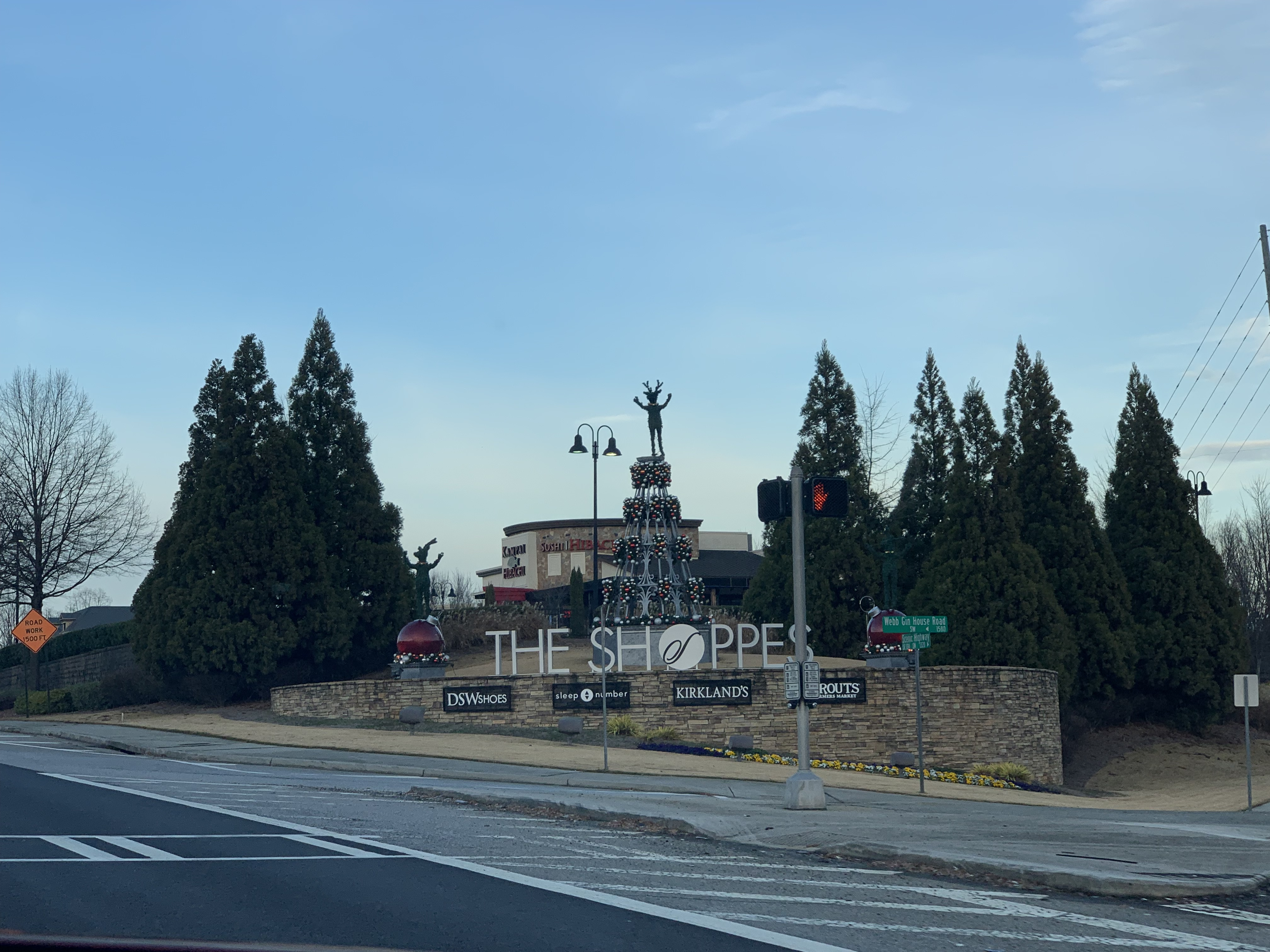
- Location: Snellville, Georgia, USA
- Coordinates: 33°53′51.07″N 84°0′15.332″W
- Opened: 2006
- Owner: Olshan Properties
- Num. of stores: 60+
- Website: The Shoppes at Webb Gin

The Shoppes at Webb Gin is a retail complex located in unincorporated Gwinnett County, near Snellville, a suburb of Atlanta, Georgia, United States. The retail complex is located along Scenic Highway North (also known as Georgia State Route 124) and Webb Gin House Road, 26 miles northeast from Downtown Atlanta.

== History ==
This location was previously called "The Avenue Webb Gin." The complex was built in 2006, and has a gross leasable retail area of 333,795 square feet and a gross leasable office area of 17,212 square feet.
