= Ronald and Nancy Reagan Research Institute =

The Ronald and Nancy Reagan Research Institute, an affiliate of the National Alzheimer's Association in Chicago, Illinois, is an initiative founded by former United States President Ronald Reagan and First Lady Nancy Reagan to accelerate the progress of Alzheimer's disease research. The center was dedicated in 1995.

== Overview ==
The development of the institute marked an important milestone in the maturation of Alzheimer's research; in 1982, most Alzheimer's research projects posed broad questions regarding the nature and effects of the disease, while the Reagan institute largely introduced – and expanded – the biological segment of disease research. The institute has awarded $12 million in research grants, and created the Ronald and Nancy Reagan Research Institute Award, given to individuals who have contributed greatly to Alzheimer's research.

President Ronald Reagan was diagnosed with Alzheimer's in 1994, and released a letter to the American people announcing his affliction. His diagnosis and decision to go public with the news greatly affected the perception of Alzheimer's and reduced the stigma attached to the disease. In 1995, he and Mrs. Reagan established the institute. When the president became too incapacitated and could not function normally, Nancy Reagan began supporting federally funded embryonic stem cell research in the hopes that such research could lead to an Alzheimer's cure. She also remained an honorary board member of the research institute. President Reagan's daughter, Maureen Reagan Revell, was very active within the research center until her death in 2001.

As of 2007, an estimated 5.1 million Americans have Alzheimer's disease. This number includes 4.9 million people age 65 and older, and at least 200,000 individuals younger than 65 with early-onset Alzheimer's. According to the Alzheimer's Association, an American is diagnosed with the disease every 72 seconds. Although there is not yet any treatment that can delay or stop the deterioration of brain cells in Alzheimer's disease, researchers have identified a number of new treatment strategies that may have the potential to change its course. A number of experimental therapies based on the amyloid hypothesis and other targets have reached various stages of clinical testing in human volunteers. The Ronald and Nancy Reagan Research Institute funded a book by leading Alzheimer's researchers about progress in new treatment strategies for Alzheimer's and Parkinson's disease.
