= Mountain Park, Gwinnett County, Georgia =

Mountain Park, Georgia
- Unincorporated community Census-designated place
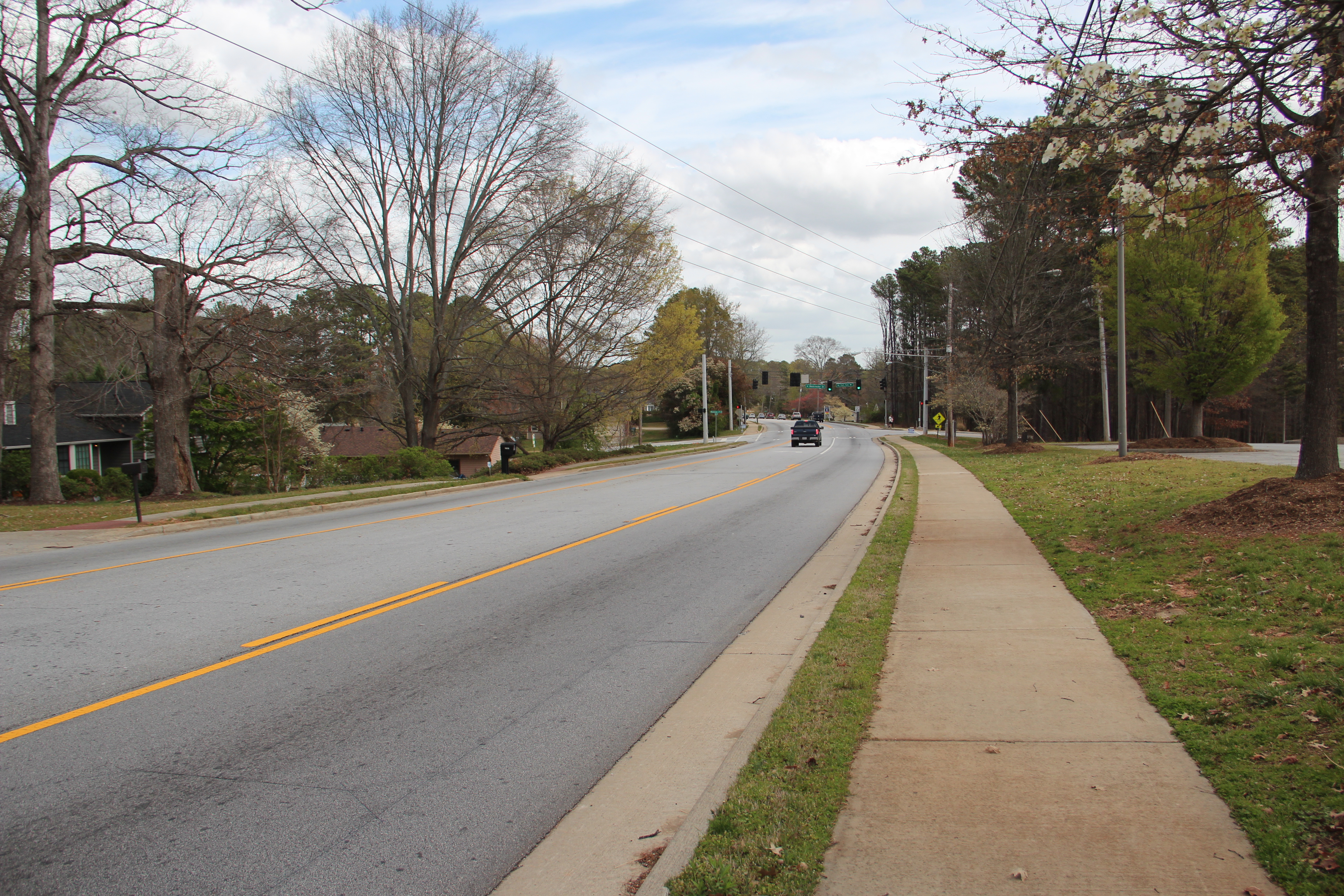
- Five Forks Trickum Road

- Location in Gwinnett County and the state of Georgia
- Coordinates: 33°50′39″N 84°07′46″W
- Country: United States
- State: Georgia
- Counties: Gwinnett

Area
  - Total: 5.8 sq mi (15 km^{2})
  - Land: 5.8 sq mi (15 km^{2})
  - Water: 0 sq mi (0 km^{2})
- Elevation: 1,024 ft (312 m)

Population (2010)
  - Total: 11,554
  - Density: 2,029/sq mi (783.5/km^{2})
- GNIS feature ID: 1867244

Mountain Park is an unincorporated community and census-designated place (CDP) in Gwinnett County, Georgia, United States. The population was 11,554 at the 2010 census. The older name for the area is Trickum, which is reflected in Five Forks-Trickum Road which bisects the community. The older community was centered on Five Forks and Rockbridge Roads.

== Geography ==
According to the United States Census Bureau, the CDP has a total area of 5.8 square miles (15 km^{2}), of which 5.8 square miles (15 km^{2}) is land and 0.17% is water.

== Demographics ==
Historical population
Census	Pop.	Note	%±
1980	9,425		—
1990	11,025		17.0%
2000	11,753		6.6%
2010	11,554		−1.7%
2020	13,089		13.3%
U.S. Decennial Census; 1850-1870 1870-1880; 1890-1910 1920-1930; 1940 1950 1960; 1970 1980 1990; 2000 2010 2020

Mountain Park first appeared as a census designated place in the 1980 U.S. census.

Mountain Park, Georgia – Racial and ethnic composition Note: the US Census treats Hispanic/Latino as an ethnic category. This table excludes Latinos from the racial categories and assigns them to a separate category. Hispanics/Latinos may be of any race.
Race / Ethnicity (NH = Non-Hispanic)	Pop 2000	Pop 2010	Pop 2020	% 2000	% 2010	% 2020
White alone (NH)	9,475	7,448	6,092	80.62%	64.46%	46.54%
Black or African American alone (NH)	694	1,646	2,601	5.90%	14.25%	19.87%
Native American or Alaska Native alone (NH)	25	40	38	0.21%	0.35%	0.29%
Asian alone (NH)	1,068	1,361	2,204	9.09%	11.78%	16.84%
Pacific Islander alone (NH)	3	10	1	0.03%	0.09%	0.01%
Some Other Race alone (NH)	25	22	75	0.21%	0.19%	0.57%
Mixed Race or Multi-Racial (NH)	150	238	476	1.28%	2.06%	3.64%
Hispanic or Latino (any race)	313	789	1,602	2.66%	6.83%	12.24%
Total	11,753	11,554	13,089	100.00%	100.00%	100.00%

As of the 2020 United States census, there were 13,089 people, 4,516 households, and 3,559 families residing in the CDP.

== Education ==
The county operates Gwinnett County Public Schools.

Gwinnett County Public Library operates the Mountain Park Branch.
