= Five Forks, Gwinnett County, Georgia =

Unincorporated community in Georgia, U.S.

Coordinates: 33°53′11″N 84°03′36″W

Friendship Church

Five Forks is an unincorporated community in Gwinnett County in the U.S. state of Georgia near the intersections of River Road, Five Forks Trickum, Oak Road and Dogwood Road. It is a former mail-stop served from the mid-1800s to early 1900s by the Yellow River Post Office and still appears on maps as a small unincorporated community between Snellville and Lawrenceville. It is connected to another nearby mail-stop called Trickum by the unusually named Five Forks Trickum Road. Currently, the center of Five Forks is home to some restaurants and shopping centers, as well as relatively new Ronald Reagan Park across the street from the Five Forks Library branch.

== Education ==
Five Forks is home to Five Forks Middle School and Gwin Oaks Elementary School feeding into Brookwood High School. All of these schools are operated by Gwinnett County Public Schools.

Gwinnett County Public Library operates the Five Forks Branch next to Ronald Reagan Parkway.
