= Falowiec =

Polish apartment buildings

Coordinates: 54.408°N 18.597°E

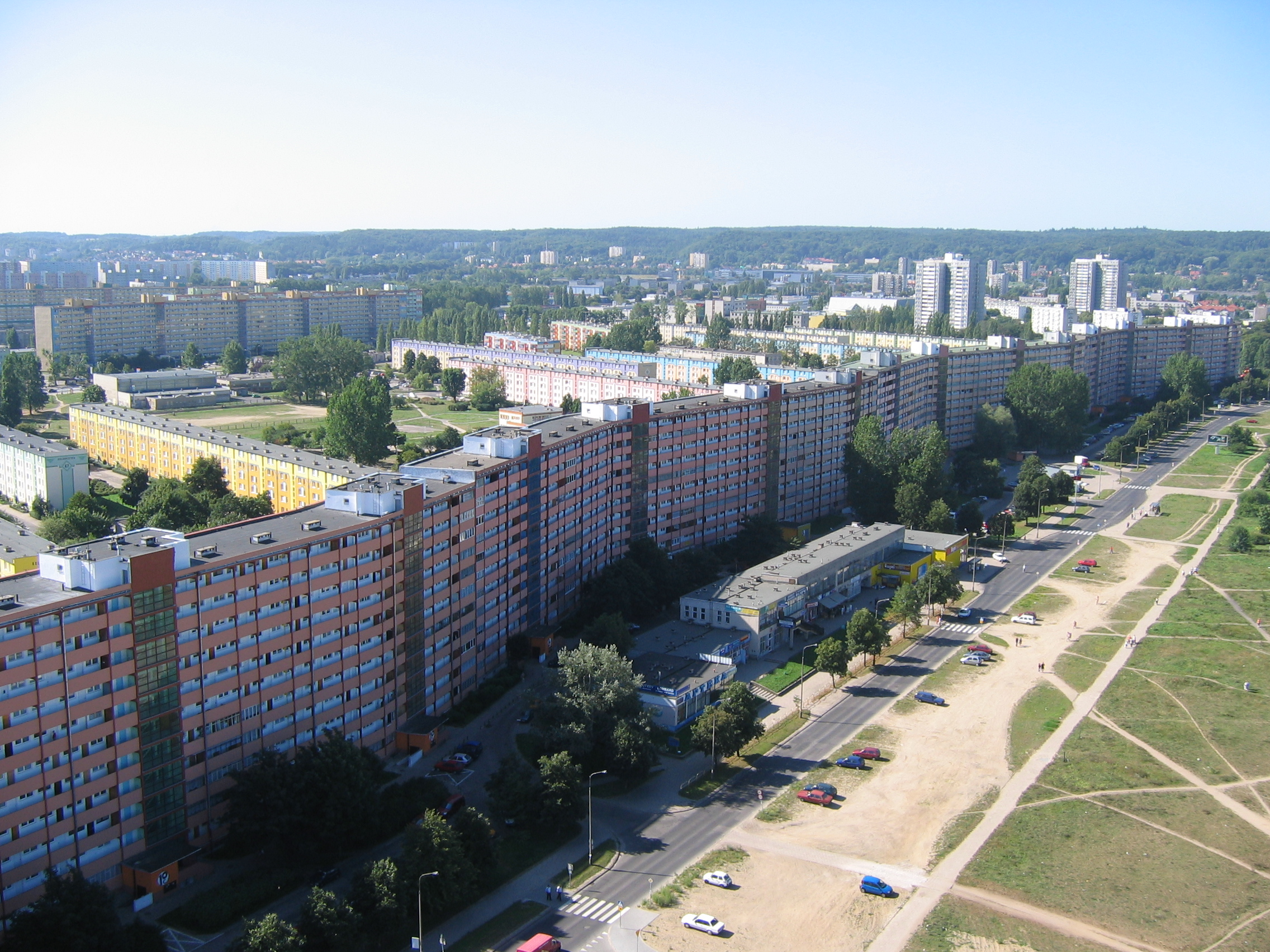
Gdańsk's longest falowiec at Obrońców Wybrzeża street

Falowiec (plural: falowce; from the Polish word fala, wave) is a block of flats characterised by its length and wavy shape. This type of building was built in Poland in the late 1960s and 1970s in the city of Gdańsk, where there are eight buildings of this type. It is an example of post-war modernism in the PRL.

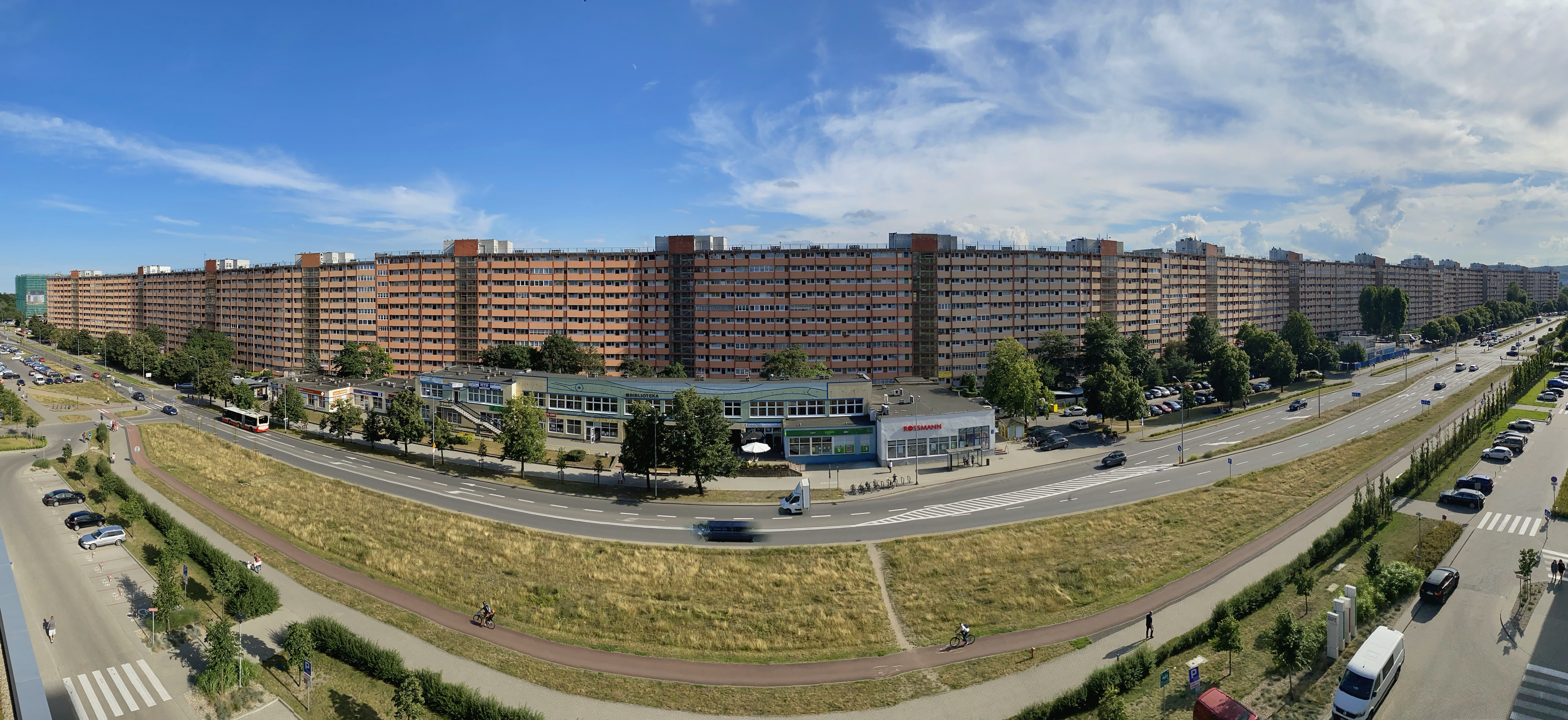
Panoramic view of the same building

The best-known falowiec in Gdańsk, located at the Obrońców Wybrzeża street, is the second longest housing block in Europe. It has:

- 11 stories (10 plus the ground floor)
- nearly 6,000 occupants
- 1,792 flats
- a length of around 860 m (2,821.52 ft)

It was featured in the 5th episode of The Amazing Race 23 as part of a roadblock.

== Similar developments ==
- Byker Wall, Newcastle upon Tyne, UK
- Corviale, Rome, Italy
- Prora, Rügen, Germany
- Park Hill, Sheffield, UK
- Karl Marx-Hof, Vienna, Austria
