= Statue of Ronald Reagan, Budapest =

Statue in Budapest, Hungary

Statue of Ronald Reagan
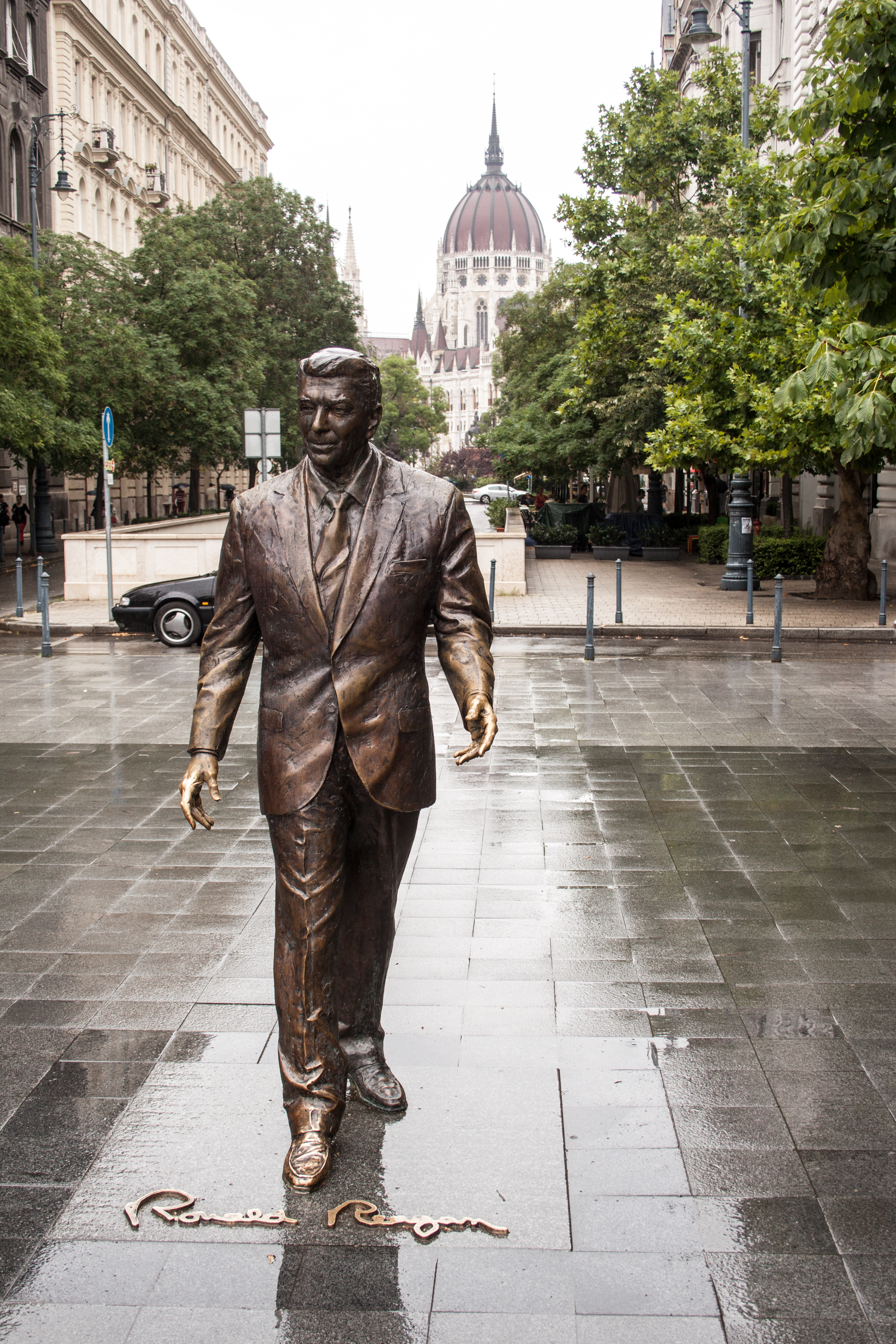
- Year: 2011
- Medium: Sculpture
- Subject: Ronald Reagan
- Location: Budapest, Hungary

A statue of Ronald Reagan by István Máté was installed in Budapest, Hungary, in June 2011.
