= Carbon Nation =

- Directed by: Peter Byck
- Produced by: Peter Byck; Artemis Joukowsky; Craig Sieben; Chrisna Van Zyl; Karen Weigert
- Starring: R. James Woolsey; Richard Branson; Denis Hayes; Van Jones; Lester R. Brown; Ralph Cavanagh; Bob Fox; Thomas Friedman; Eban Goodstein; Gary Hirshberg; Sadhu Aufochs Johnston; Amory B. Lovins; Joel Makower; Edward Mazria; Arthur H. Rosenfeld; John Rowe (CEO) Exelon
- Narrated by: Bill Kurtis
- Edited by: Peter Byck; Patrick Coleman Duncan (assistant editor)
- Music by: Robert Hawes; Matt Heck
- Production company: Earth School Education Foundation
- Release dates: October 22, 2010 (Tallgrass); February 11, 2011 (United States)
- Running time: 86 minutes
- Country: United States
- Language: English

Carbon Nation is a 2010 documentary film by Peter Byck about technological- and community-based energy solutions to the growing worldwide carbon footprint. The film is narrated by Bill Kurtis.

Rather than highlighting the problems with use of fossil fuels, Carbon Nation presents a series of ways in which the 16 terawatts of energy the world consumes can be met while reducing or eliminating carbon-based sources. It contains optimistic interviews with experts in various fields, business CEOs, and sustainable energy supporters to present a compelling case for change while having a neutral, matter-of-fact explanation.

Among those interviewed are Richard Branson, former CIA director R. James Woolsey, Earth Day founder Denis Hayes and environmental advocate Van Jones.

Much of the content of the film consists of interviews, some are listed above. The list of interviewees also includes

- Lester R. Brown – president, Earth Policy Institute
- Sean Casten – president and CEO, Recycled Energy Development
- Ralph Cavanagh – lead attorney, NRDC
- Bob Fox – partner, Cook+Fox Architects
- Thomas Friedman – author and The New York Times columnist
- Eban Goodstein – economic professor, Lewis and Clark College
- Gary Hirshberg – chairman, president, and CEO of Stonyfield Farm
- Sadhu Aufochs Johnston – chief environmental officer, City of Chicago
- Amory B. Lovins – chairman and chief scientist, Rocky Mountain Institute
- Joel Makower – executive director, GreenBiz.com
- Edward Mazria – executive director, Solar Richmond
- Arthur H. Rosenfeld – commissioner, California Energy Commission
- John Rowe (CEO) Exelon – chairman and CEO, Exelon Corporation
- Sherri W. Goodman

== See also ==
- An Inconvenient Truth
- Renewable energy commercialization
- Community wind energy
