= Touhy Avenue =

Road in Illinois

- Patrick L. Touhy Memorial Avenue; 7200 North
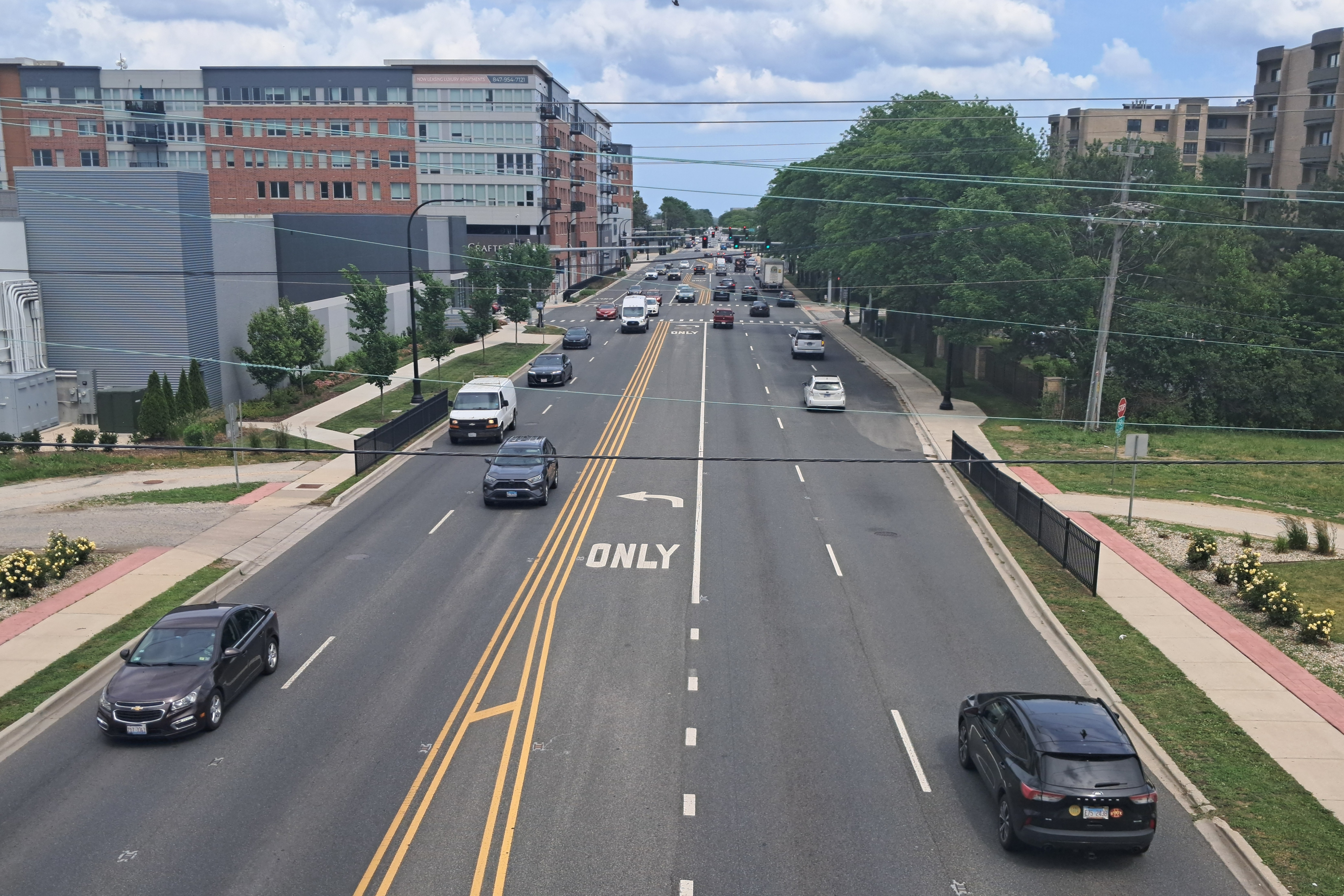
- Touhy Avenue at the Valley Line Trail
- Interactive map of Touhy Avenue
- Part of: IL 72
- Location: Chicago, Lincolnwood, Skokie, Niles, Park Ridge, Des Plaines, Rosemont, Elk Grove Village
- West end: Tonne Road, Elk Grove Village
- Major junctions: US 12 / US 45 in Des Plaines; I-294 Toll in Park Ridge; I-94 in Skokie; US 41 in Lincolnwood
- East end: 1200 W (near Lake Michigan, Chicago)

Touhy Avenue (/ˈtuːiː/) is a major street throughout northern Chicago, Illinois as well as the north and northwestern suburbs of the city. It is named for Patrick L. Touhy, a subdivider who was also the son-in-law of Phillip Rogers, an early settler who helped develop Rogers Park. Points of interest along Touhy Avenue include Loyola Park, the Winston Towers, the Lincolnwood Town Center, Loeber Motors, Hebrew Theological College, Village Crossing Shopping Center, Pointe Plaza, the Shure Headquarters Building, the Leaning Tower of Niles, the Pickwick Theatre, the northern end of O'Hare International Airport, and the crash site of American Airlines Flight 191.

== Major intersections ==
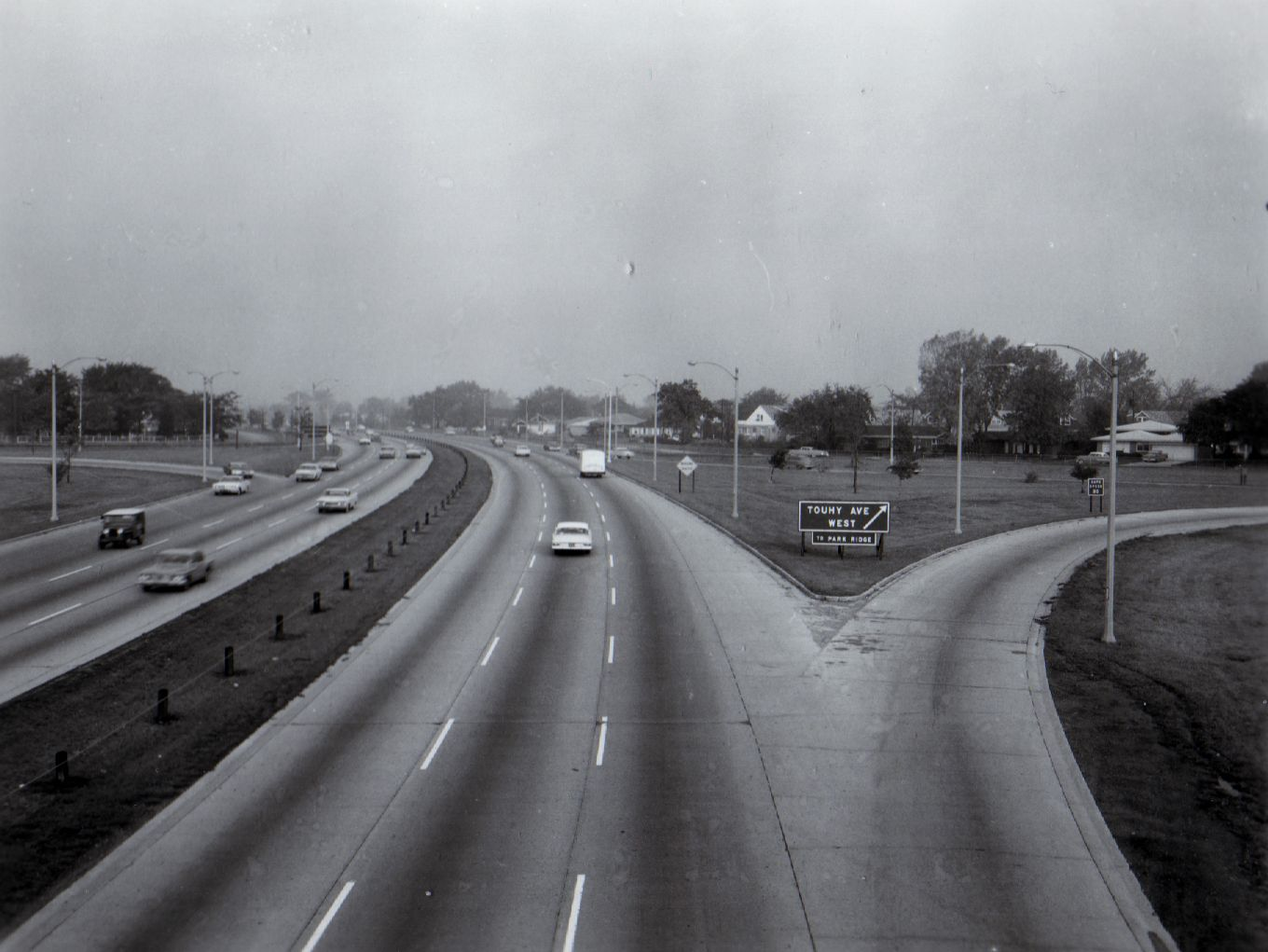
Touhy Avenue Exit on Interstate 94, 1960

The entire route is in Cook County.

Location	mi	km	Destinations	Notes
Elk Grove Village	0.0	0.0	Tonne Road	Western terminus; roadway continues as Elk Grove Boulevard
Elk Grove Village	1.1	1.8	IL 83 (Busse Road)	
Elk Grove Village	2.0	3.2	IL 72 west (Higgins Road)	Western end of IL 72 concurrency
Des Plaines	4.4	7.1	IL 72 east (Lee Street)	Eastern end of IL 72 concurrency
Rosemont–Des Plaines line	5.0	8.0	US 12 / US 45 (Mannheim Road)	
Park Ridge	5.8	9.3	I-294 Toll south (Tri-State Tollway) – Indiana	Southbound I-294 entrance; northbound I-294 exit only
Chicago–Niles line	9.0	14.5	IL 43 (Harlem Avenue)	
Chicago–Niles line	9.9	15.9	US 14 (Caldwell Avenue)	
Skokie–Lincolnwood line	11.9	19.2	I-94 (Edens Expressway) – Chicago, Milwaukee	
Lincolnwood	12.0	19.3	IL 50 (Cicero Avenue)	
Lincolnwood	12.5	20.1	US 41 (Lincoln Avenue)	
Chicago	16.4	26.4	Cul-de-sac near Lake Michigan	Eastern terminus
1.000 mi = 1.609 km; 1.000 km = 0.621 mi: Concurrency terminus; Incomplete access
