= Sherri W. Goodman =

American security executive and lawyer

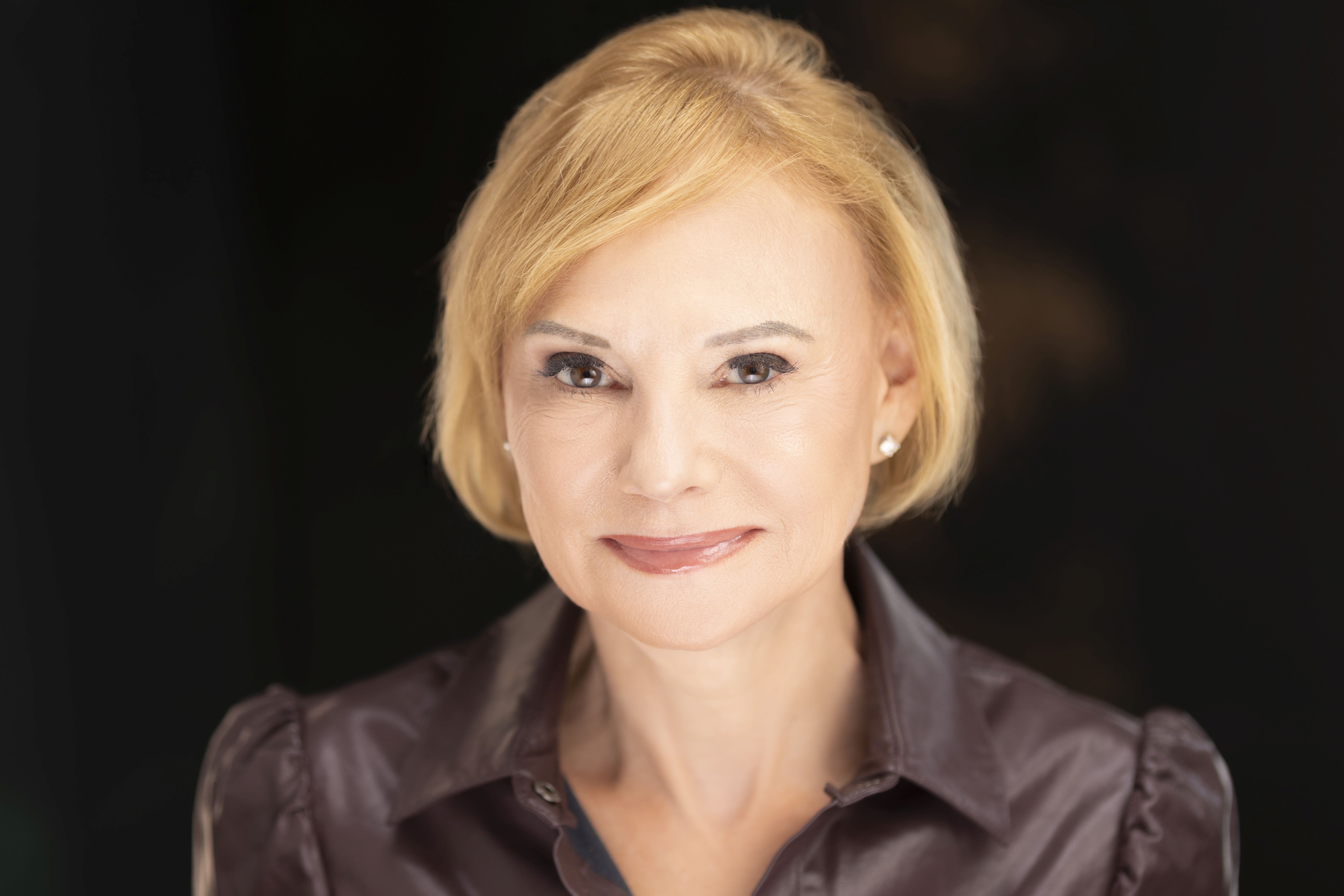
- Goodman in 2023
- Born: Sherri Lynn Wasserman Goodman; April 9, 1959 (age 66); New York City, New York, US
- Spouse: John Goodman
- Parent(s): George Wasserman; Renate Wasserman
- Website: https://www.sherriwgoodman.com/

Sherri Lynn Wasserman Goodman (born April 9, 1959) is an American security executive and lawyer. She is a senior fellow with the Polar Institute and the Environmental Change and Security Program at the Woodrow Wilson International Center, as well as serving as the senior strategist at the Center for Climate and Security. Goodman also serves as the secretary general of the International Military Council on Climate and Security. Previously, she served as president and CEO of the Consortium for Ocean Leadership.

== Early life and education ==
Born in New York City, Goodman is the daughter of George (February 20, 1931–February 19, 2015) and Renate Wasserman, Holocaust refugees who arrived in New York in the 1930s. Her father is a Korean War Army veteran. Her mother worked for an art consulting service in Scarsdale, New York.

A summa cum laude graduate of Amherst College, Goodman holds a J.D. degree from Harvard Law School and a master's degree in public policy from the Harvard Kennedy School. In 2018, Goodman received an Honorary Doctorate in Humane Letters from Amherst College.

== Career ==
Goodman served as senior vice president and general counsel of the Center for Naval Analysis (CNA). There, she was also the founder and executive director of the CNA Military Advisory Board. Reports from the board include:

- National Security and the Threat of Climate Change (2007),
- National Security and the Accelerating Risks of Climate Change(2014),
- The Role of Water Stress in Instability and Conflict(2017), and
- Advanced Energy and US National Security (2017).

She appeared as herself in the 2010 film Carbon Nation. The 2016 film The Age of Consequences, directed by Jared P. Scott, which features Goodman, is based on the work of the CNA Military Advisory Board.

Goodman was the first Deputy Under Secretary of Defense (Environmental Security) from 1993 to 2001. In this role, she served as the United States Department of Defense's chief environment, safety, and occupational health officer, overseeing an annual budget exceeding $5 billion. Additionally, she established performance metrics for environmental, safety, and health programs within the Department and led energy, environmental, and natural resource conservation programs. Overseeing the President's plan for revitalizing base closure communities, she ensured the base property was available for transfer and reuse. Furthermore, she developed and led the Arctic Military Environmental Cooperation Program, which addressed hazardous liquid waste streams from decommissioned Russian nuclear submarines in the 1990's.

In early October 1997, Goodman supported including an exemption for military operations to protect 'military readiness' in the Kyoto Protocol. However, the Protocol did not enter into force in the United States because of the Byrd-Hagel Resolution. Moreover, Goodman also developed the DoD's first strategy on climate change and clean energy, supporting military efforts to understand climate risks and maintain readiness during the energy transition.

From 1987, Goodman served on the staff of the Senate Armed Services Committee for Committee Chairman Senator Sam Nunn. She practiced law at Goodwin Procter as a litigator and environmental attorney. Additionally, she worked at RAND Corporation and SAIC, contributing to research and analysis in security and environmental fields.

Goodman serves on the boards of the Atlantic Council, the EXIM Bank's Climate Council, the Joint Ocean Commission Leadership Council, the Marshall Legacy Institute, Sandia National Laboratory's Energy and Homeland Security External Advisory Board, the Secretary of State's International Security Advisory Board, and the Woods Hole Oceanographic Institution (WHOI). She is a life member of the Council on Foreign Relations, served on its Arctic Task Force in 2016, and serves on the Board of its Center for Preventive Action. She also serves on the board of Scientista, a nonprofit organization that supports women in STEM fields.

Previously, she served on the Boards of Blue Star Families, the Committee on Conscience of the United States Holocaust Memorial Museum, the National Academy of Sciences' Boards on Energy and Environmental Systems (BEES) and Environmental Systems and Toxicology (BEST), the Advisory Board to the US Global Change Research Program, and the University Corporation for Atmospheric Research (UCAR).

She also served on the Responsibility to Protect Working Group co-chaired by former Secretary of State Madeleine Albright.

In 2010, Goodman served on the Quadrennial Defense Review Independent Panel co-chaired by former National Security Advisor Stephen Hadley and former Secretary of Defense William Perry.

Goodman has testified before committees of the United States Congress, and various media outlets have published interviews with her. She has served as an adjunct lecturer in international affairs and security at the Harvard Kennedy School and as an adjunct research fellow at the Kennedy School's Belfer Center for Science and International Affairs. She has advised Virginia Tech and the University of Chicago on curriculum for environmental security and lectures at universities and other organizations.

She is the author of "Threat Multiplier: Climate, Military Leadership, and the Fight for Global Security," published by Island Press in 2024.

== Honors ==
Goodman has twice received the DoD Medal for Distinguished Public Service, the Gold Medal from the National Defense Industrial Association, and the United States Environmental Protection Agency's Climate Change Award.

In 2024, Goodman received the Lifetime Achievement Award from the Environmental Peacebuilding Association.

== Personal life ==
In 1987, she married John Goodman. The couple has three children.

== See also ==
- Climate change mitigation
- Climate change adaptation
- Effects of global warming
