= Jarvis Square =

Neighborhood of Chicago

Coordinates: 42.016022°N 87.66805°W

Jarvis Square is a small commercial district within the Rogers Park community on Chicago's far North Side.

== Location ==
The area is located at the junction of West Jarvis Avenue (7400 N) and North Greenview Avenue (1500 W). which is two blocks from Lake Michigan.

== Schools ==
Two public elementary schools are within a mile of Jarvis Square; Eugene Field and Stephen F. Gale Community Academy. Secondary education for the area is provided by Chicago Math and Science Academy High School and Roger C. Sullivan High School.

== Name recognition ==
The name for the area evolved from the numerous week-end Flea Markets that were held during the summers of 2003–2005 by The Harvest, an antique resale shop once located on the southeast corner. New businesses have generated a revival in the Jarvis Square economy since 2000.

== Transportation ==
Jarvis Square is accessible via the Jarvis stop on the CTA Red Line.

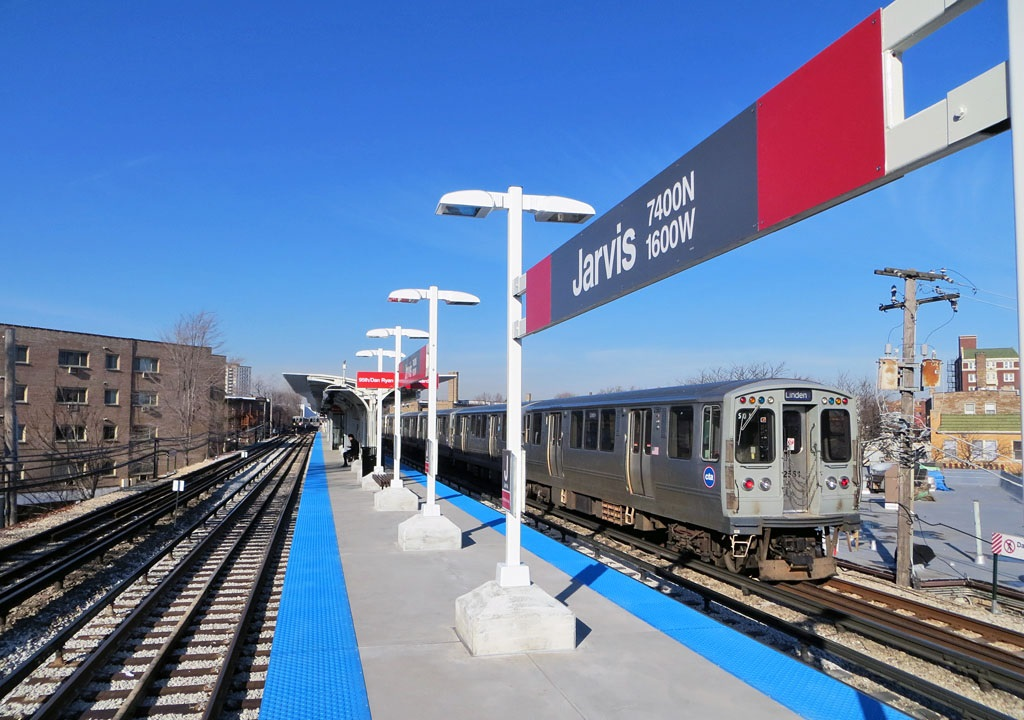
Jarvis "L" Stop

== Events ==
Jarvis Square was the setting for Rogers Park's first annual Halloween Party for Kids on October 31, 2008. In addition, the office of Joe Moore, former Alderman of Chicago's 49th Ward, was located in Jarvis Square.
