= Steven Point =

Lieutenant Governor of British Columbia from 2007 to 2012

The Honourable Steven Point OC OBC
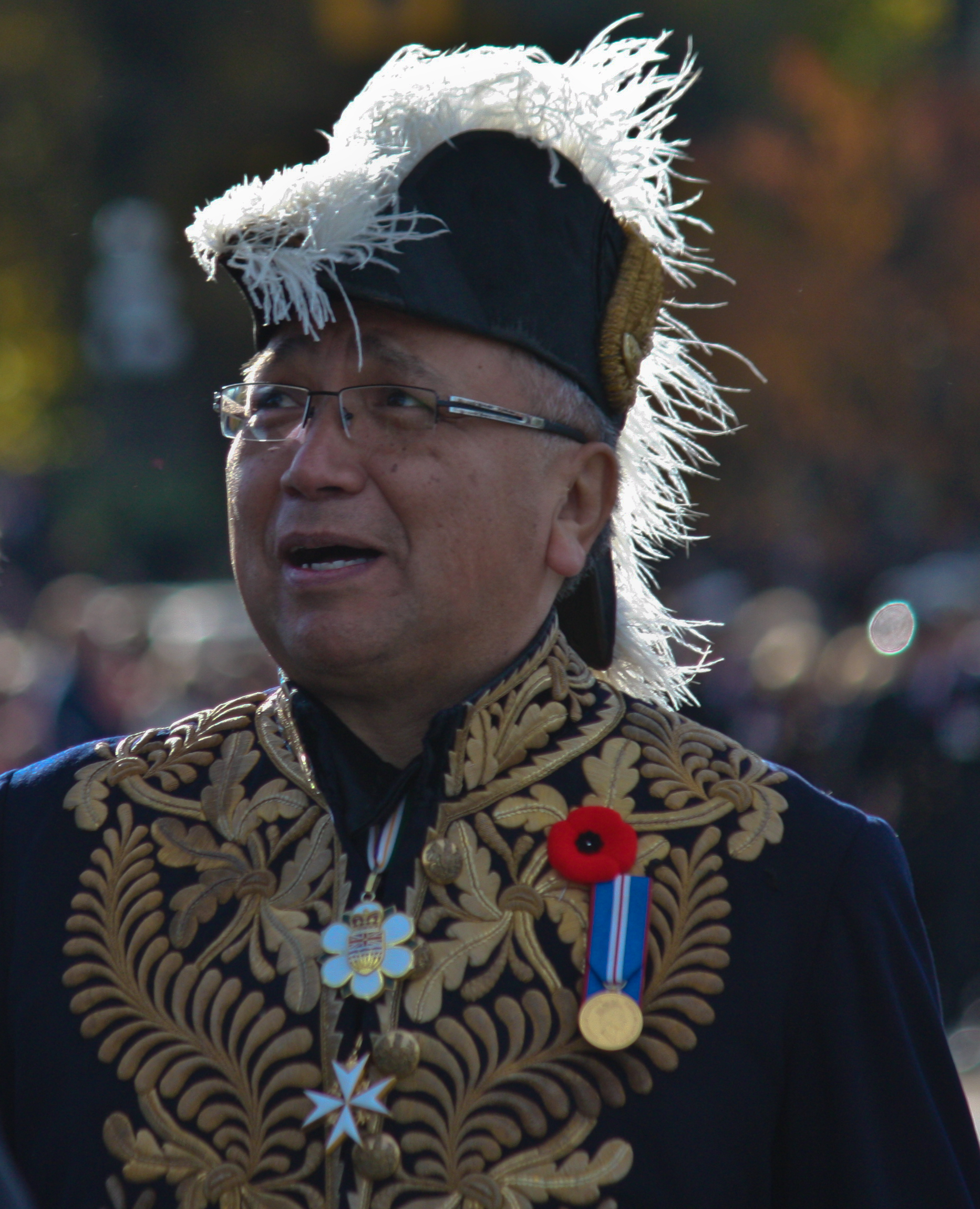
- Point in 2009

28th Lieutenant Governor of British Columbia
- In office October 1, 2007 – November 2, 2012
- Monarch: Elizabeth II
- Governors General: Michaëlle Jean; David Johnston
- Premier: Gordon Campbell; Christy Clark
- Preceded by: Iona Campagnolo
- Succeeded by: Judith Guichon

Chancellor of the University of British Columbia
- In office 2020–2024
- Preceded by: Lindsay Gordon
- Succeeded by: Judy Rogers

Personal details
- Born: July 28, 1951 (age 75) Chilliwack, British Columbia, Canada
- Spouse: Gwendolyn Point
- Children: Á'a:líya Warbus; Steven L. Point; Christine Seymour
- Education: University of British Columbia (LLB)
- Occupation: Academic administrator

Steven Lewis Point, OC OBC (Xwelíqwetel) (born July 28, 1951) is a Canadian academic administrator, criminal lawyer, and jurist. He was the chancellor of the University of British Columbia from 2020 to 2024. He served as the 28th Lieutenant Governor of British Columbia from 2007 to 2012. He also served as the chair of the advisory committee on the safety and security of vulnerable women, a committee that provides community-based guidance to the implementation of the recommendations from the Missing Women Commission of Inquiry.

From 1975 to 1999, Point served as Chief of the Skowkale First Nation. From 1994 to 1999 he served as Tribal Chair of the Stó:lō Nation. In December 2023 it was announced that he will be invested into the Order of Canada as an Officer of the Order, the Governor General of Canada Mary Simon making the announcement.

== Education ==
Point attended the University of British Columbia, where he graduated with a Bachelor of Laws degree in May 1985, and was later a faculty member.

== Career ==
From 1986 to 1989 he practiced criminal law and native law as a partner in the law firm of Point and Shirley. He worked for Citizenship and Immigration Canada as an immigration adjudicator for several years, starting in about 1989, at its refugee backlog office in Vancouver. In 1999, he became a British Columbia Provincial Court judge. On February 28, 2005, he became Chief Commissioner of the British Columbia Treaty Commission.

His appointment as Lieutenant Governor was announced on September 4, 2007, by Prime Minister Stephen Harper. He assumed his duties in a ceremony at the Legislative Assembly of British Columbia on October 1, 2007. As the Queen's viceroy in British Columbia, he was styled His Honour while in office and retains the style of The Honourable for life.

On December 17, 2012, Point was appointed chair of an Advisory Committee under a one-year contract that allowed him to bill up to $220,000 in that year. The position required him to assist the Minister of Justice to implement the recommendations dealing primarily with police reform and public safety made by Wally Oppal in his Inquiry Report released December 12, 2012. On May 17, 2013, Point resigned from his position as chair on the grounds that lawsuits commenced by the children of missing women prevented him from fulfilling his mandate. Members of the Advisory Committee and family members expressed doubt about this reason on the basis that Point had expressed his intention to resign before the children's lawsuits were filed, and on the basis that there is no logical or practical connection between his work as chair of the Advisory Committee and the lawsuits.

On February 20, 2014, Point was re-appointed as a provincial court judge, effective March 3, 2014. He retired from office on October 31, 2018.

On June 18, 2020, Point was introduced as the 19th Chancellor of the University of British Columbia, succeeding Lindsay Gordon from July 1, 2020.

In 2022, a residential street in Richmond, British Columbia, was renamed from Trutch Avenue to Point Avenue due to the racism associated with Joseph Trutch, the first lieutenant governor of British Columbia, and to honour Point.

== Personal life ==
Point's daughter, Á'a:líya Warbus, is a member of the Legislative Assembly of British Columbia in the riding of Chilliwack-Cultus Lake.

== Awards ==
- Queen Elizabeth II Golden Jubilee Medal, 2002
- Order of British Columbia, 2007
- Knight of The Most Venerable Order of the Hospital of St. John of Jerusalem, 2008
- Queen Elizabeth II Diamond Jubilee Medal, 2012
- Officer of the Order of Canada, 2023

== Honorary degrees ==
Point has received many honorary degrees in recognition of his service to British Columbia and to Canada. These include:

Honorary degrees

Location	Date	School	Degree
British Columbia	2000	University College of the Fraser Valley	Doctor of Laws (LL.D)
British Columbia	November 14, 2012	University of Victoria	Doctor of Laws (LL.D)
British Columbia	2013	University of British Columbia	Doctor of Laws (LL.D)
British Columbia	2017	Capilano University	Doctor of Laws (LL.D)
British Columbia	June 14, 2018	Justice Institute of British Columbia	Doctor of Laws (LL.D)

== Arms ==
Coat of arms of Steven Point

Adopted
March 20, 2009
Crest
An eagle displayed reguardant Or its head Argent
Escutcheon
Azure a serpent with a head at each end in base respectant Argent its back enarched and set with fusils Sable, in chief five mullets in chevron Or
Supporters
Two timber wolves Sable
Compartment
A grassy mount set with cedar branches and dogwood flowers proper rising above barry wavy Argent and Azure
Motto
LĚTSǍ MÖT Salish: ONE MIND
Symbolism
The double-headed serpent emblem was given to His Honour by his father, who was from the Musqueam Indian Band. The five stars allude to the Five Star canoe club, which was named after a constellation of stars important to his people. In forming a chevron, they come to a point, making an allusion to his name. The eagle represents His Honour's name from the Blackfoot of "Flying eagle". The supporters honour His Honour's mother who was head of the Wolf Clan of the Sumas First Nation. The dogwood represents his leadership of the province of British Columbia. The compartment represents the habitat of the wolf. Meaning "One mind", this phrase in the Salish language expresses the concept of unity.

== See also ==
- Notable Aboriginal people of Canada
- The Canadian Crown and Aboriginal peoples

Order of precedence
Preceded by Iona Campagnolo as 27th Lieutenant Governor of British Columbia	Order of precedence in British Columbia	Succeeded by Judith Guichon as 29th Lieutenant Governor of British Columbia
Academic offices
Preceded by Lindsey Gordon	Chancellor of the University of British Columbia; 2020 – 2024	Succeeded by Judy Rogers
