= Phillip Rogers =

Irish settler of America

- Born: August 15, 1812; County Louth, Ireland
- Died: December 13, 1856 (aged 44); Rogers Park, IL
- Occupation: farmer

Phillip Rogers (August 15, 1812 – December 13, 1856) was a settler of Irish origin who migrated to the Chicago area from Watertown, New York in 1836. He built a cabin on Ridge Avenue and bought a tract of land in the unincorporated area now bounded by Touhy Ave., Western Ave., Ridge Ave., and Morse Ave. from the government for $1.25 an acre. He continued to accumulate land and eventually owned approximately 1,600 acres (6.5 km^{2}), farming much of it.

Rogers's son-in-law, Patrick L. Touhy, inherited his holdings, subdivided some of the land, and began developing it in the 1870s. In 1878 a village was incorporated and named Rogers Park after Rogers. Following annexation by the City of Chicago in 1893, the neighborhood continued to be called Rogers Park.

Besides the former village and present community area, landmarks named after Rogers include Rogers Avenue, the public park called Rogers Park at 7345 N. Washtenaw Ave., Rogers Beach Park, and the Phillip Rogers Elementary School. As of 1925, ruins of the original Rogers homestead were still present on Ridge Ave., but were not preserved.
