= Patrick L. Touhy =

American businessman

Patrick L. Touhy (1839–1911) of Chicago, born in Ireland was a real estate developer instrumental in the subdividing and development of the Rogers Park section of Chicago. Touhy Avenue is named after him.
