= Chicago Alternative Policing Strategy =

Community driven policing strategy

Chicago Alternative Policing Strategy (CAPS) is a community driven policing strategy designed for the Chicago Police Department that aims to bridge the gap between the police force and the citizens of Chicago. CAPS started in 1993 as a pilot program in five of the 25 police districts in Chicago - Englewood, Marquette, Austin, Morgan Park, and Rogers Park - after a realization that the community and police were becoming increasingly isolated from one another throughout Chicago since the early 1960s. The original five districts, characterized by high crime rates and cases of extreme poverty, provided the Chicago Police Department with an initial benchmark from which to determine the program's strengths and weaknesses. By 1995, the Chicago Police Department implemented CAPS across all Chicago neighborhoods with the goal of blending traditional policing strategies with alternative strategies aimed at encouraging community members and police to work together in order to prevent and control crime. The program's motto, "Together We Can," emphasizes the need for increased lines of communication between the community and the police, so that together they could come up with solutions for chronic neighborhood problems.

== Implementation ==
The CAPS Implementation Office was created and staffed by civilian community outreach workers who organized court advocacy programs and coordinated city services in support of CAPS related programs. The implementation includes five strategies: problem-solving, turf orientation, community involvement, linkage to city services, and new tools for police. Other features of the implementation strategy include support from other government agencies, enhanced training, computerized crime analysis, updated marketing and communications techniques, stricter and more quantitative evaluation metrics, and long-term strategic planning.

=== Problem Solving ===
The problem-solving initiative requires officers to develop proactive policing strategies beyond responding to calls, such as identifying the concentration of crime in certain areas and entering those communities to diffuse and prevent future crime. Between 1995 and 1997, most of the police force in Chicago in addition to 10,000 civilians received training to aid their ability to recognize hotbeds of crime and understand how such areas come to be in an effort to prevent more from arising.

Training involved recognizing a problem as a persistent issue affecting a significant portion of the population in the area and following a five-step plan: Identify the issues in the community and decide an order of addressing each, Analyze available information on the issue at hand, Design out of the box solutions with preventative stress, Implement the solutions while coordinating with the respective city offices as well as the community and Evaluate effectiveness. This problem-solving method was supplemented in Chicago by re-design within the Chicago police department, such as a complete restructuring of the 911 system and a more teamwork friendly hierarchy.

=== Turf Orientation ===
Turf Orientation is a strategy used to familiarize officers with certain communities within the city. Chicago was split into 279 beats, or districts, with roughly 8–10 officers assigned to each beat. The Turf Orientation implementation proved difficult, as it required officers to stay in a certain area to build trust within a community over an extended period of time, leaving fewer officers available to respond to the high volume of 911 calls. This forced the city to hire more officers, ensuring that the force was not short-staffed, and that trust between the officers and communities was not completely severed.

This technique was deemed moderately successful in a 2002 report. Increased rapid response teams unattached to a specific beat combined with improved methods of communication and technology allowed for a more efficient strategy. As of 2002, this method led to officers staying within their beat for around 66% of their calls, near the 70% goal. Beats that were closest to the goal tended to be more high-activity areas although, in those same areas, officers found it difficult to keep up with all activity. Just 30% reported having enough time for preventative efforts with the community.

=== Community Involvement ===
Community involvement allowed the police force to be more responsive to the needs and requests of the public, which not only aims to help alleviate crime but also to solidify relationships between communities and officers. Individuals became involved by attending local beat meetings. Meetings generally take place monthly at a regular time and are generally held in a community area, such as a church, park or school. A CAPS facilitator runs the meetings, running the meeting according to an agenda and calling on community members to ask questions. The police are active members and play a major role in all discussions.

Another major component of meetings is the special role played by a small group of dedicated beat meeting activists. These activists come to meetings frequently in their beats, driving up attendance and CAPS related activism. CAPS related activism includes marches, rallies, prayer vigils, and smoke-outs (group barbecue at gang or drug-infested sites). Community members who attend the meeting have the chance to ask questions and voice concerns about crime-related problems in their neighborhood, hear reports by the police on crime activity in their beat, and meet neighbors who are also concerned about the safety of their community. Attendance is generally higher where it is needed. The beat meetings where attendance is the highest are usually areas with bad housing, high levels of crime, and poor schools. Citizen awareness of CAPS has increased over time, but several studies have found that awareness is highest among African American residents of Chicago.

In 2000, the United States Department of Justice found that beat meeting attendance rose steadily with levels of civic engagement, rising to more than 40% among residents involved in at least three kinds of local organizations. Church involvement showed a high correlation with CAPS involvement as well; one explanation proposed for this is many CAPS meetings are held in churches, especially in African American communities where both CAPS and church involvement are particularly strong.

=== Linkage to City Services ===
Linkage to city services allowed the police force to communicate and coordinate with other city agencies to streamline responsiveness. For instance, an interagency database was created to provide access to all city employees regarding crime areas, high-profile criminals, and even police activity. Additionally, the police coordinated with other city agencies regarding graffiti removal and abandoned car removal, as residents expressed those two issues as major frustrations within their communities.

=== New Tools for Police ===
New tools for police introduced a handful of new strategies for curbing crime in Chicago. New crime-mapping software was developed to encourage the routine distribution of crime-related data to both the public and those who regularly attended beat meetings. Specific task forces were created to enforce anti-gang and anti-drug house ordinances throughout the city. The Chicago Police Department collaborated with building, health, and fire inspectors to ensure that any identified drug houses were kept under control and within the city building codes. Additionally, local prosecutors and county attorneys placed a greater emphasis on cooperation with the CAPS in order to prevent reoccurring offenses.

== Operation ==
Chicago is divided into 25 police districts and further divided into 279 police beats. Beats are small geographic areas to which police officers are assigned. Rather than changing beat officers daily, CAPS assigns the same officers to a particular beat for at least one year in order to encourage partnerships and problem-solving at the beat level, and to allow officers to develop relationships within the neighborhoods in which they work. The Office of Emergency Management and Communication (OEMC) dispatchers use a call priority matrix, often assigning the "nearest police unit" to respond to calls. This strategy, coupled with attrition shorts from under-staffing the police department, may result in officers spending most of their day off the beat.

The Chicago Police Department solved this dilemma by creating teams of rapid response officers in each of Chicago's 25 Police Districts.These rapid response officers still use the traditional methods for emergencies and rapid response, and are able to take most of the emergency calls in their sectors, which are groupings of three to five beats. Aside from responding to emergency calls, the rapid response officers were put in place to not only provide backup to beat officers who may be assisting the community elsewhere, but to help each beat officer maintain a solid presence in his or her respective beats. Each month, community beat meetings are held in all of Chicago's 279 beats, without the participation of any off-duty (not working) police personnel. Individual residents meet with their beat officers and other police personnel to discuss neighborhood problems and hopefully develop strategies to address them. Beyond the community, CAPS heavily relies on city agencies and services to prevent crime. The City of Chicago has set up cooperative efforts with the Mayor's Liquor License Commission, the Department of Streets and Sanitation, the Department of Buildings, and other agencies to ensure the police have support from the city to handle smaller issues, such as abandoned buildings and graffiti, before they lead to more serious crimes. CAPS has no underlying criminology theory as its basis, and no rigorous academic studies have shown CAPS as an entirely effective or efficient anti-crime tool.

== District Advisory Committees ==
In addition to the monthly beat meetings, there are also District Advisory Committees (DAC), which meet regularly with the District Commander to discuss district affairs. The members of the DAC are generally community leaders, business owners or local community activists. The goal of the DAC is to discuss district priorities and develop district-wide strategies with community resources. A 2004 Northwestern University report, Caps at Ten, claimed that many members were frustrated with their ill-defined mandates, leadership problems, and inaction. Many DAC members argued that CAPS had taken the shape of a more bureaucratic organization, instead of an overall guide for the policies of the Police Department. Community members and researchers have isolated a handful of problems with DACs that have caused them to become ineffective and untrustworthy: lack of a clear mission, weak subcommittees, lack of independence from the police force, and members who are generally out of touch with the community and demographically unrepresentative of the community they represent.

== Results and assessments ==
From 1991 to 2002, overall violent crime in Chicago dropped 49%. City officials reported that, as of 2002, both violent crime and property crime dropped in each of the 25 police districts. However, most reports find it difficult to conclude that CAPS is the leading variable responsible for the overall drop in crime. In certain beats, citizens actually experienced increases in crime rates, proving that that strategy was not entirely successful, according to a Northwestern University study. Policing strategies often get little to no rigorous evaluation or assessment, leading to a lack of data and evidence regarding the efficacy of the program.

Several community groups have been vocal supporters of CAPS. In the Prairie district (Beat 2111), the beat facilitator explained he was able to communicate with police mugging and theft hotspots in order to help reduce those crimes. As a result of his involvement in CAPS and partnership with the CPD, he noted those types of crimes have decreased significantly. Additionally, in the Gresham district, Pastors United for Change said that the partnership with their district's beat officers resulted in the shutting down of a motel that was a known drug spot and the closure of a liquor store that sold alcohol to minors.

One study noted two important difficulties while implementing the community problem-solving strategies of CAPS. First, better results were found in "high-capacity" beats where citizens' economic and social statuses were much more secure and the population usually had more in common with the police population. These same neighborhoods tended to have a more positive perspective of the police after the program. In comparison, what were deemed "low-capacity" areas held a more diverse population with little interest in the community as much of the people were renters who lived there for under 5 years. The areas tended to have high concentration of crime and leadership was much less likely to implement problem-solving and community techniques leading to complete failure. Second, racial divisions in some of the more stable communities where the program looked to be promising led to lack of coordination. Beat officers had a difficult time mediating while sticking to the regulatory style their position requires.

Though the Chicago Police Department's budget increased since Rahm Emanuel took office as Mayor, the portion of the budget allotted for CAPS has decreased to roughly a third of its original funding level. Due to budget cuts and other resource shortages, fewer beat meetings have been held and fewer beat officers have been placed in various communities.

== Revitalized in 2013 ==
In January 2013, Mayor Rahm Emanuel and former Police chief Garry McCarthy pledged to revitalize the CAPS program. The central office was dismantled and resources were shifted to each of the 25 Police districts. "Under the new initiative, each police district will be assigned a CAPS sergeant and two police officers, as well as a community organizer and a youth services provider. Four citywide coordinators will oversee community policing programs targeted at victim assistance, seniors, youth, and victims of domestic violence."

These tools allowed residents to text anonymous crime tips to police, including pictures and descriptions of crime scenes. Though these efforts have been responses to public criticisms, Jesse Jackson spoke out against the measures, arguing that these technological improvements do not resolve the reasons that people commit crimes in the first place. Police also began working toward allowing community members to take part in beat meetings from their homes by using Skype and similar services, without having to transport themselves to the physical meeting location. Additionally, the Chicago Police Force reinstated the ridealong program to allow community members to shadow beat officers and also created another name for CAPS - the Community Relations Strategy.

== Public perceptions and criticisms ==
One comprehensive study found that residents in CAPS neighborhoods were 61% more likely to be satisfied with efforts of the police to reduce and prevent crime when compared to neighborhoods without CAPS. However, the study also found that residents in CAPS neighborhoods were only "marginally" more satisfied with police keeping order when compared to neighborhoods without CAPS. An assessment conducted ten years after implementation of CAPS found that between 1993 and 2000, public perceptions of police effectiveness increased steadily until eventually leveling off in 2000. This demonstrates that the public's confidence in police increased initially as a result of the program. The study notes that this confidence is not specific to particular demographic groups, and is instead a general increase in confidence across all racial and ethnic groups. The report also finds that after 1998, residents became less satisfied with the responsiveness and effectiveness of CAPS, which could possibly be credited to the Chicago Police Department's inability to keep enough beat officers staffed in their respective beats. Though the public trusts the intent and demeanor of police, with 90% of respondents saying they found the police concerned about their problems, only 57% of those same respondents found the police to be responsive to their concerns. One long-time Chicago resident in particular, who regularly attended beat meetings for over three years, stated that the police was doing a very poor job of carrying out the CAPS, and that many times she found police response and action to be almost non-existent. After providing the police with numerous tips and detailed information regarding drug houses, she claims that nothing was ever done to remedy these issues within her community.

Public perception of the Chicago Police Department as a whole is different depending on the race of the respondent and independently affects the efficacy of policing strategy, according to numerous studies. Among African-American and Latino respondents, less than a majority of respondents articulated a positive view of CAPS as a whole. Four out of the five Chicago Police districts throughout which the program was initially tested in 1993 are characterized by a majority African-American population and high crime rates, backing the claim that little was done within these communities to curb illegal activities. Another report conducted by Northwestern University found that, after ten years of CAPS' implementation, both white and African-American residents felt a decreased fear of crime in their area. This gap between the perceptions of effectiveness among whites and minority groups was found to be the same ten years after CAPS implementation as it was before the strategy was implemented in 1993, illustrating that the CAPS did not effectively bridge the gap between the police and the community as a whole. Possible explanations for this gap include the Chicago Police department's inability to effectively connect with the community members in each individual beat, and the overall ineffectiveness of the CAPS in areas where community members are less involved.

A 2002 Department of Justice report cited three main obstacles for future operations and implementation. The first obstacle was fluctuation of leadership investment in and accountability to the program, and no system to monitor, assess and manage it. The second obstacle cited was the rapid growth of Latino/a and Asian populations in Chicago at the time of the report. Barriers to community policing with these populations included the language, culture and legal statuses of new residents. The third obstacle was imbalanced resource allocation across the city without clarity on how much time individual officers should devote to community problem solving compared to traditional crime fighting, alongside declining federal resources for police hiring and declines in city revenue.

== Community policing today ==
While the CAPS section of the Chicago Police Department website still remains, news about CAPS and its effects after 2013 remain scarce. The CAPS page itself discusses beat meetings and community policing but CPD focus has shifted from the program to a general community-based policing strategy.

On January 13, 2017, the US Justice Department released a report that reprimanded the CPD's police officers. An agreement was arranged with the city that is court-enforced to make several reforms. As a result, the department released its full framework for reform in a booklet on March 14, 2017, entitled Next Steps for Reform. It details information on the new Community Policing Advisory Panel (CPAP), chaired by Chief of Patrol Fred Waller, which will spearhead the further revitalization of the community policing strategy. This will work in conjunction with improved training, increased supervision, edited policy (specifically on the subject of the use of force) and increased transparency/accountability.CPD has already made some changes in its crime fighting technique, using data to isolate which neighborhoods shootings are more likely to occur.

The panel, as stated in the booklet, is staffed by CPD employees, those with authority on community policing and leaders within the community. This panel's immediate goal was to draft a report to assist in the department's reform by the end of March. In order to do so, it opened an online source for residents to send information through will hold three separate town hall meetings during the month of April.
