= Village Crossing Shopping Center =

Shopping center in Illinois, United States

Village Crossing
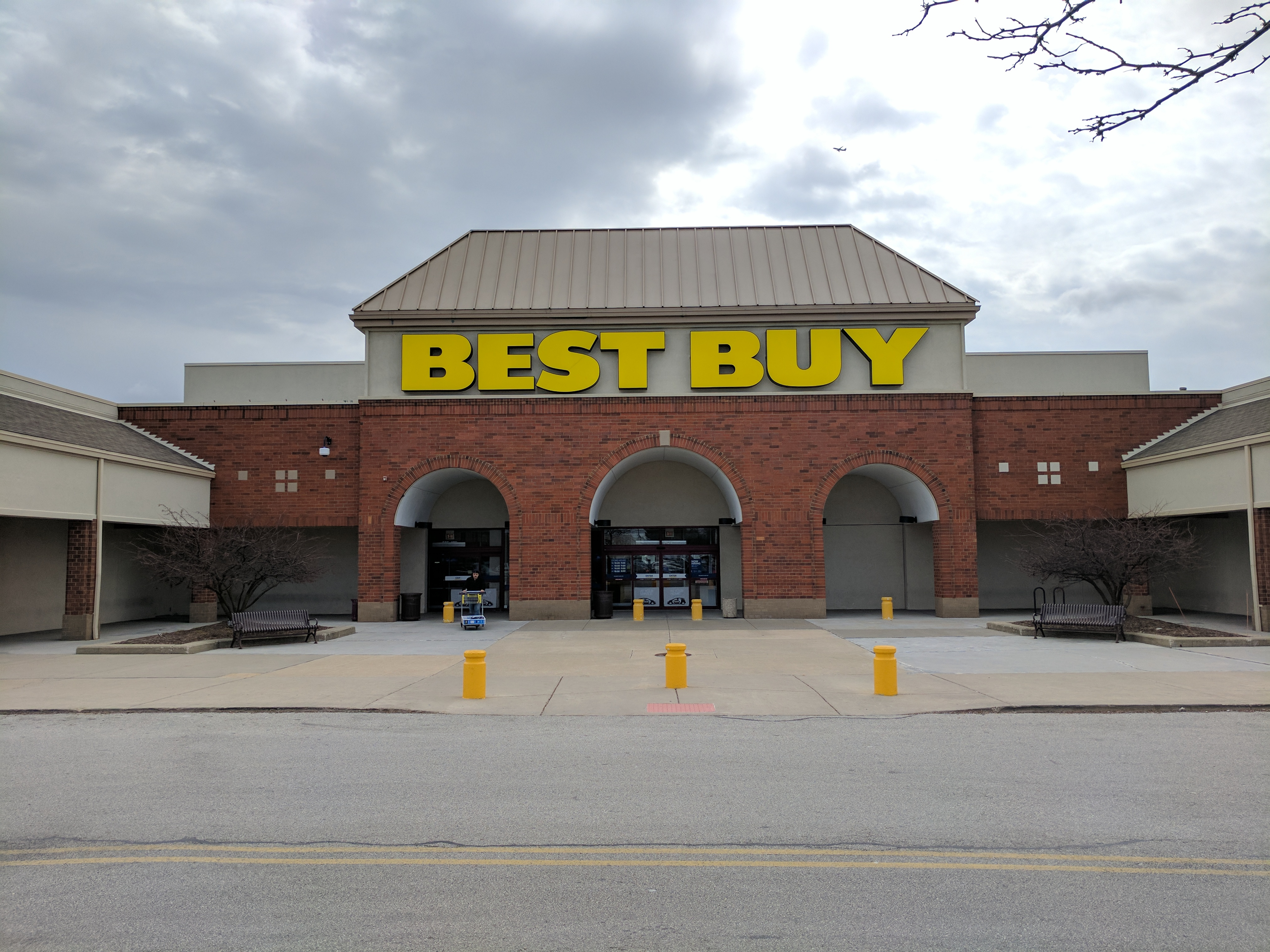
- A Best Buy store in Village Crossing
- Location: Skokie, Illinois, Niles, Illinois United States
- Coordinates: 42.0101°N 87.7658°W
- Address: 5507 W Touhy Ave
- Opened: 1989
- Developer: Trammell Crow Company
- Num. of stores: 57
- Num. of anchor tenants: 10
- Floor area: 722,457 sq ft
- Floors: 1 (2 on Dick's Sporting Goods)
- Parking: 9,440 spaces
- Public transit: Pace
- Website: Archived official website at the Wayback Machine (archived 2009-07-24)

Village Crossing Shopping Center, or simply Village Crossing, is a regional shopping center located on Touhy Avenue (Illinois Route 72) between the border of Skokie, Illinois and Niles, Illinois. The shopping center hosts 57 retail stores and is anchored by Jewel-Osco, Dick’s Sporting Goods, Petsmart, Michael's, Best Buy and an 18-screen AMC Theatres cinema.

== History ==
Village Crossing Shopping Center opened in 1989, on the former site of a 63-acre industrial facility run by AT&T and the Teletype Corporation in Skokie, Illinois.

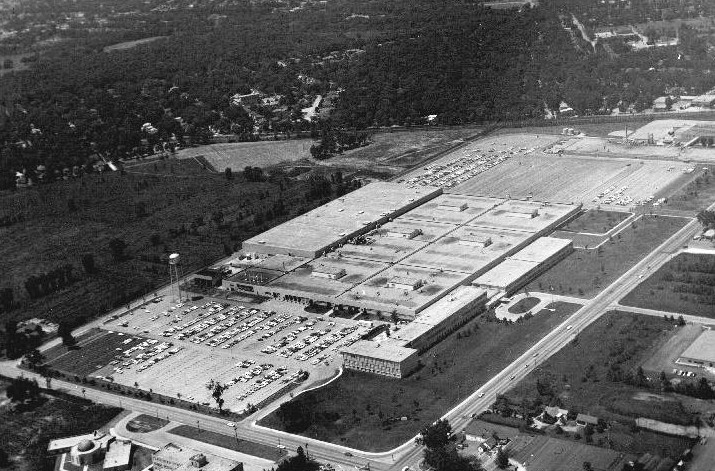
Aerial photo of Village Crossing as an industrial facility in the 1960s

in 1987, AT&T announced the closure of their teletype facility and that all 1000 employees would be moved into another facility in Naperville, Illinois,. After almost 30 years of operation, the facility officially closed later that same year.

The site was acquired and developed by the Trammell Crow Company for an undisclosed sum. Construction began in the beginning of 1988. Many structures of the industrial complex were demolished in favor of parking spaces as well as a 500,000 square foot parking garage.

One of the first anchor stores to open in the first phase of Village Crossing was a 65,000 square foot Jewel-Osco building and a 112,000 square foot Montgomery Ward store (which closed in 2001 due to bankruptcy).

In 2001, Crown Theaters Village Crossing 18 opened. Crown Theaters was acquired by Kerasotes in 2007, which in turn was acquired by AMC in 2011.
