= Penny Ballem =

Canadian physician and government administrator

Penny Janet Drury Ballem OBC is a Canadian physician and government administrator. She was the city manager for the City of Vancouver, British Columbia, Canada from 2008 to 2015 and served as a member of the VANOC board of directors, corporate director for Bentall Capital G.P. Ltd., as well as a senior adviser to RPO Management Consultants. She is a physician and clinical professor at the University of British Columbia Medical School in the department of hematology and bone marrow transplant. Since April 2025, she has started a new role as the CEO of Provincial Health Authority Services (PHSA) in the province of British Columbia, Canada.

== Childhood ==
Ballem grew up in the Westmount area of Montreal, Quebec, Canada. She was one of five children of a Montreal engineer and his wife.

== Education ==
Ballem completed her undergraduate studies at McGill University and her Masters in Immunology at the University of Western Ontario. She received her medical degree in 1978 from the University of British Columbia, and completed her specialist fellowship at the University of British Columbia as well.

== British Columbia Deputy Health Minister ==
She was recruited by British Columbia Premier Gordon Campbell to be the deputy health minister of the Province of British Columbia in 2001, and subsequently abruptly resigned from the position in 2006 after giving no notice, not seeking severance, and criticizing the government's plans for the health ministry as unsound.

== Vancouver, British Columbia City Manager ==
=== Selection ===
Ballem was Vancouver Mayor Gregor Robertson's top choice to head Vancouver's civil administration, to provide a "fresh start" after coming to power. Vision Vancouver, Mayor Robertson's political party, had concerns that the previous city manager had too much power. Within one week of Gregor Robertson taking office, former Vancouver city manager Judy Rogers, a 25-year veteran of Vancouver City Hall, was replaced by Ballem. Ballem was selected without the government conducting a candidate search. Rogers received $572,000 severance in the transition.

=== Bylaw powers ===
In July 2009 Vancouver City Council passed several temporary bylaw changes which were controversial for some civil liberties advocates who argued that they "make it more difficult to exercise [the] fundamental constitutional rights to free speech, peaceful assembly and free expression." As part of the changes Ballem was given special powers that were referred to by Coalition of Progressive Electors councillor Ellen Woodsworth as "wide open carte blanche." Vancouver Mayor Gregor Robertson defended the changes as necessary.

=== Staff transitions ===
Ballem was charged by Mayor Robertson with cutting costs at city hall and attempted to do so through a centralization of powers. When asked about senior city staff's concerns about her micromanagement style, Ballem responded, "Tough, eh."

In her first 10 months as city manager there were a large number of departures and non-scheduled retirements of city staff. In one such departure Ballem stripped the retiring Vancouver Park Board general manager, Susan Mundick, of all routine transitional duties. Ballem then stated she would help the park board choose Mundick's replacement, a selection process city hall traditionally had not been involved in. In response, Vancouver city councilor Suzanne Anton urged Mayor Robertson and the city council to limit Ballem's control of the park board.

On September 1, 2009 Ballem announced that Sadhu Aufochs Johnston would be hired as Deputy City Manager to lead the city's environmental efforts.

=== Conclusion ===
On September 15, 2015 Mayor Robertson announced that Ballem's service had "concluded" and Sadhu Aufochs Johnston would be her interim replacement.

== eHealth Ontario Scandal ==
Ballem was paid $30,000 for 78 hours of consulting work for eHealth Ontario, over the objections of an eHealth Ontario employee who claimed there was no signed contract. Ballem stated she was unaware an eHealth Ontario staff member had questioned her invoice, and that she was hired directly by the CEO of eHealth Ontario without a contract. RPO Management Consultants, which Ballem served as a senior advisor, received an untendered $600,000 contract from eHealth Ontario. Sarah Kramer, former CEO of eHealth Ontario, was fired on June 7, 2009 over a scandal involving failing to open more than $5.5 million worth of contracts to competitive bids.

== Relationship ==
Ballem's partner, Olympic medalist Marion Lay, was a major backer of the Vancouver Olympics.
