= Adelphi Theater (Chicago) =

The Adelphi Theater was a historical theatre building in Chicago built in 1917, located in the Rogers Park neighborhood at 7074 N. Clark Street until its demolition in 2006. The building was designed by J. E. O. Pridmore, featuring brick and terracotta edifice and a seating capacity close to 1000, in an auditorium slanted toward the screen. Chicago artist Ed Paschke was once a tenant in the second floor studio space. Despite protest from the "Citizens for the Adelphi Theater" advocacy group, the building was demolished in 2006.

The Adelphi Theatre underwent an Art Deco remodel in the 1930s. It was modernized in both the 1940s and 1950s, then building began to decline in the late 1960s. The theater closed in the early 1980s and reopened in 1986 as the North Shore Cinema, before returning to the name Adelphi Theatre in 1991. In the mid 1990s, it became known as one of the few local venues that showed Bollywood films. The Adelphi Theatre closed in January 2002, and was demolished in January 2006.

== History ==
The Adelphi Theater was located at the intersection of Clark Street and Estes Avenue.

Bill Morton, owner of 4x Records, moved to Rogers Park so that he could continue to work on his business and, while looking for space for his business, came upon the vacant theater. He became infatuated with the building and its history and worked out a deal with its owners so that his band and company could use the space while upgrading its interior. The mounting struggles to keep the building standing soon became evident and Bill Morton started his first not for profit organization, Citizens for the Adelphi Theater. There was much support for Citizens for the Adelphi Theater to raise funds and renovate the beautiful, architecturally sound building.

Alderman Joe Moore, however, agreed to the sale and demolition of the building so that condominiums could be built in its place.

== See also ==
- List of Chicago Landmarks
