= CNA (nonprofit) =

Research and analysis organization

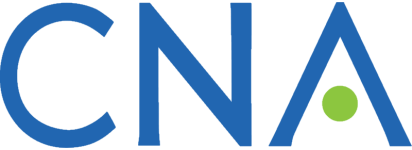
- Founded: 1942; 84 years ago
- Type: 501(c)(3) organization
- Tax ID no.: 54-1558882
- Purpose: Research and analysis services
- Location: Arlington County, Virginia, U.S.
- Key people: Katherine A.W. McGrady, President and CEO
- Employees: 625
- Website: www.cna.org

CNA, legally the CNA Corporation, is a non-profit corporation located in Arlington County, Virginia, USA.

It has two major components. The larger component is its Federally Funded Research & Development Center (FFRDC), the Center for Naval Analyses. The other component is its (non-FFRDC) government services arm, called the Institute for Public Research (IPR). CNA Corporation has around 625 total employees. Roughly 500 of those are employees of the FFRDC.

== History ==
CNA traces its origins to the Antisubmarine Warfare Operations Group (ASWORG), formed in 1942 to assist the US Navy with scientific advice for finding and attacking U-boats that were sinking commercial ships off the Atlantic coast of North America. Massachusetts Institute of Technology physics Professor Philip M. Morse founded ASWORG at the request of Capt. Wilder D. Baker, then commander of the Antisubmarine Warfare Unit of the Atlantic Fleet. Morse is considered the father of operations research in the United States.

By the end of World War II, the organization had expanded to almost 80 scientists serving on eight military bases in the Atlantic and Pacific as well as at the Washington, D.C. headquarters. They advised U.S. forces on air, antiaircraft, submarine, amphibious, and antisubmarine operations. Though the group served the military, it was designed to be civilian and independent in order to preserve the objectivity of its analysis, and was administered by Columbia University.

In 1945, the Department of the Navy decided to support the continuation of the group under the name the Operations Evaluation Group (OEG), which exists to this day as a division within CNA. OEG grew rapidly during the Korean War, during which one of its analysts, Irving Shaknov, was killed in combat. In 1962, OEG was merged with smaller naval advisory groups to form the Center for Naval Analyses (CNA). CNA was administered by various non-profit organizations until approximately 1990, when the CNA Corporation was created as a non-profit corporation to operate the CNA FFRDC.

The first ongoing analysis support program for a non-defense agency began in 1991 for the Federal Aviation Administration. All non-defense work at CNA was brought together under its Institute for Public Research in 1993, with the Center for Naval Analyses remaining as the other division of CNA.

== Structure ==
CNA Corporation consists of two primary components. One, the Center for Naval Analyses (CNA), is a Federally-Funded Research & Development Center (FFRDC) sponsored by the US Department of Navy. That division focuses on Department of Navy work, but also performs work other US Defense Department organizations. The other large component, the Institute for Public Research (IPR), instead focuses on work for civilian parts of the US Federal Government, and also for state and local governments (including public universities). There also is a third, much smaller, component, which is the CNA Military Advisory Board.

=== Center for Naval Analyses ===
The Center for Naval Analyses (CNA) is the only federally funded research and development center (FFRDC) sponsored by the US Department of Navy. The Navy Department sponsors CNA primarily to provide studies & analyses for the United States Navy and Marine Corps. It secondarily provides studies & analysis to other US Defense Department components, and to certain other US Government agencies with the goal of improving the efficiency and effectiveness of U.S. national defense efforts. The Center for Naval Analyses is a Studies & Analysis FFRDC, similar to RAND Corporation or the Institute for Defense Analyses. CNA does not perform either Systems Engineering or Scientific/Engineering Development work. This makes CNA somewhat different from other FFRDCs, such as Aerospace Corporation, Mitre Corporation, or MIT Lincoln Laboratory.

==== CNA Divisions ====
This FFRDC has seven divisions: Advanced Technology Assessment, Operational Warfighting, Regional Strategy & Policy Analysis, Resources & Force Readiness, and Systems, Tactics & Force Development. Each provides scientific and analytical support on operational problems of immediate concern to the military.

==== CNA Field Program ====
A key differentiator between the Center for Naval Analyses and all other FFRDCs is its Field Program. This places CNA analysts on rotational assignments serving aboard each deployed US Navy Carrier Strike Group, with certain other deployed Navy or Marine Corps combat elements, and a range of Navy and Marine Corps commands. As an example, CNA has an analyst deployed to the Navy's Top Gun training school aboard Fallon NAS; the "civilian analyst" shown in the original Top Gun movie was an example of a CNA analyst. While other FFRDCs often have permanent employees assisting defense acquisition organizations, none has an ongoing program that embeds analysts with deployed combat elements.

=== Institute for Public Research (IPR) ===
The Institute for Public Research conducts research and analysis on domestic policy issues for federal, state, and local government agencies, including the United States Department of Homeland Security, the United States Department of Justice, the Federal Emergency Management Agency, the Federal Aviation Administration, and the United States Department of Education.

It has four divisions: Education; Energy, Water, & Climate; Enterprise Systems and Data Analysis; and Safety & Security.

=== CNA Military Advisory Board ===
The CNA Military Advisory Board is an advisory group composed of retired three-star and four-star generals and admirals from the Army, Navy, Air Force, and Marine Corps that studies pressing issues of the day to assess their impact on U.S. national security.

In April 2007, the MAB issued its first report entitled "National Security and the Threat of Climate Change." The report projects that climate change will pose a serious threat to America's national security, especially by creating instability in already volatile regions.

In May 2009 the MAB issued a report that explores the impact of America's energy choices on our national security policies. This report, titled "Powering America’s Defense: Energy and the Risks to National Security," considers the security risks inherent in our current energy posture; energy choices the nation can make to enhance our national security; the impact of climate change on our energy choices and our national security; and the role the Department of Defense can play in the nation's approach to energy security and climate change.

The MAB also released reports in 2010, 2011, and 2014 The May 2014 report, "National Security and the Accelerating Risks of Climate Change" re-examines the impact of climate change on U.S. national security.

The most recent MAB report, "National Security and Assured U.S. Electrical Power," was released in November 2015. The 2015 report found that "the current U.S. electrical grid – based on centralized power generation and interconnected and aging distribution architecture – is susceptible to a wide variety of threats."

== Leadership ==
CNA Headquarters in Arlington, VA

Katherine A.W. McGrady, Ph.D. is President and Chief Executive Officer of CNA. She was previously CNA's Chief Operating Officer.

Some current or prior members of CNA Corporation's Board of Directors include:

- Maura Harty, Chair
- Lieutenant General Robert R. Blackman Jr., USMC (Ret.)
- Vice Admiral William R. Burke, USN (Ret.)
- Daniel A. Domenech
- Admiral Mark E. Ferguson III USN (Ret.)
- Carol Graham
- Katherine A.W. McGrady
- Vice Admiral Adam M. Robinson Jr., USN (Ret.)
- Laurie O. Robinson
- Sarah Sewall
- Sean Stackley
- Roderick K. von Lipsey
