= Chicago Math and Science Academy =

- The logo of CMSA.

Location
- 7212 N Clark St; Chicago, Illinois 60626; United States
- 42°0′47″N 87°40′30″W

Information
- School type: Charter school
- Established: 2004
- School district: Chicago Public Schools
- CEEB code: 140721
- NCES School ID: 170993005092
- Principal: Angela Huls
- Teaching staff: 53.00
- Grades: 6-12
- Gender: Coed
- Enrollment: 603 (2015-2016)
- Student to teacher ratio: 46:1 (2015-2016)
- Campus size: 2 acres (0.81 ha)
- Campus type: Urban
- Colors: Navy blue Burgundy
- Slogan: Nothing is impossible.
- Athletics conference: Chicago Public League
- Mascot: The Titan
- Website: www.cmsaonline.net

Chicago Math and Science Academy (CMSA), a public charter school, authorized by Chicago Public Schools (CPS) and rated by CPS as Level 1, or Level 1+ school for eight years consecutive years. CMSA is a middle school and high school (grades 6th-12th) located in Chicago, Illinois in the Rogers Park neighborhood. For three years in a row, U.S. News & World Report has ranked CMSA as the #1 public charter high school in Illinois. The school has 600 students and 45 full-time equivalent teachers for the 2018-2019 school year. CMSA opened in 2004, and the school is managed by Concept Schools, a non-profit charter management organization.

As of 2018, 95% of the students were eligible for the free lunch program.

== Academics ==
Chicago Math and Science Academy does not have a selective enrollment process. Admission to the school is done via a public lottery drawing each year in February. Parents can apply to the school for all grades via an online form. If any open seats are available, the student is automatically accepted. If no seats are available, the student is placed in a public lottery to randomly select students to fill the remaining seats. Finally, the rest of the students are placed on a waiting list.

For the past four years, CMSA has been ranked by the Chicago Public Schools Board as a Level 1+ school, according to their School Quality Report. In addition, for the past three years U.S. News & World Report has ranked CMSA as the #1 public charter high school in Illinois.

== Campus ==
The original Chicago Math and Science Academy building was located on 1705 West Lunt Avenue. The two buildings were the original site for St. Jerome Parish School, and were being leased by CMSA. It shared its campus with St. Jerome Catholic Church, although no religious affiliation was established between the two separate organizations. On days when school was not in session, the building was used as a Sunday school for the church parishioners. These two buildings are approximately 42,000 square feet in size.

In May 2009, Chicago Math and Science Academy purchased the vacant Clark Mega Mall property for $5.5 million and moved to its current location at 7212 North Clark Street. The new building had 54,000 square feet, up 14,000 from the old buildings. The new building originally did not have a gym, but one was constructed and officially opened in November 2013. The school currently does not have a dedicated auditorium.
