= Military Advisory Board =

United States defense advisory group

The CNA Military Advisory Board (MAB) is an U.S. defense advisory group composed of retired generals and admirals. It is made up of three-star and four-star generals and admirals from the Army, Navy, Air Force, and Marine Corps that studies pressing issues of the day to assess their impact on U.S. national security. CNA is a nonprofit research and analysis organization that operates the Center for Naval Analyses and the Institute for Public Research. The CNA Military Advisory Board was founded by Sherri Goodman, former Deputy Undersecretary of Defense (Environmental Security), who served as the Executive Director of the CNA MAB from its founding in 2007–2015.

== General ==
In April 2007, the MAB issued its first report entitled "National Security and the Threat of Climate Change." The report argued that climate change will pose a serious threat to U.S. national security, especially by creating instability in already volatile regions.

In May 2009 the MAB issued a report that explores the impact of U.S. energy choices on U.S. national security policies. This report, titled "Powering America’s Defense: Energy and the Risks to National Security," considers the security risks inherent in our current energy posture; energy choices the nation can make to enhance our national security; the impact of climate change on our energy choices and our national security; and the role the Department of Defense can play in the nation's approach to energy security and climate change.

The MAB also released reports in 2010, 2011, and 2014 The May 2014 report, "National Security and the Accelerating Risks of Climate Change" re-examines the impact of climate change on U.S. national security.

The most recent MAB report, "National Security and Assured U.S. Electrical Power," was released in November 2015. The 2015 report found that "the current U.S. electrical grid – based on centralized power generation and interconnected and aging distribution architecture – is susceptible to a wide variety of threats."

== 2007 Report ==
Principal Findings

The CNA Military Advisory Board looked at the conditions climate changes are likely to produce, how those conditions may affect U.S. national security interests, and what actions the nation should take to address these consequences. Its principal findings included the following:

- Projected climate change poses a serious threat to U.S. national security.
- Climate change acts as a threat multiplier for instability in some of the most volatile regions of the world.
- Climate change, national security, and energy dependence are a related set of global challenges.

Recommendations

Based on these findings, the Board made several recommendations, including the following:

1. The national security consequences of climate change should be fully integrated into national security and national defense strategies. The intelligence community should incorporate climate consequences into its National Intelligence Estimate.
2. The U.S. should commit to a stronger national and international role to help stabilize climate change at levels that will avoid significant disruption to global security and stability.
3. The U.S. should commit to global partnerships that help less developed nations build the capacity and resiliency to better manage climate impacts.
4. The Department of Defense should enhance its operational capability by accelerating the adoption of improved business processes and innovative technologies that result in improved U.S. combat power through energy efficiency.
5. The Department of Defense should conduct an assessment of the impact on U.S. military installations worldwide of rising sea levels, extreme weather events, and other projected climate change impacts over the next 30 to 40 years.

== Group members ==
Eleven highly respected retired admirals and generals, headed by former Army Chief of Staff General Gordon R. Sullivan, comprised the CNA Military Advisory Board in 2007.

- General Gordon R. Sullivan, USA (Ret.) (Chairman)
- Admiral Frank “Skip” Bowman, USN (Ret.)
- Lieutenant General Lawrence P. Farrell Jr., USAF (Ret.)
- Vice Admiral Paul G. Gaffney II, USN (Ret.)
- General Paul J. Kern, USA (Ret.)
- Admiral T. Joseph Lopez, USN (Ret.)
- Admiral Donald L. “Don” Pilling, USN (Ret.)
- Admiral Joseph W. Prueher, USN (Ret.)
- Vice Admiral Richard H. Truly, USN (Ret.)
- General Charles F. “Chuck” Wald, USAF (Ret.)
- General Anthony C. “Tony” Zinni, USMC (Ret.)

The 2015 MAB members are:

- General Ron Keys, USAF (Ret.), Chairman, CNA's Military Advisory Board
- Vice Admiral Lee F. Gunn, USN (Ret.), Vice Chairman, CNA's Military Advisory Board
- Brigadier General Gerald E. Galloway, Jr., USA (Ret.), Vice Chairman, CNA's Military Advisory Board
- Admiral Frank Bowman, USN (Ret.)
- General James T. Conway, USMC (Ret.)
- Lieutenant General Ken Eickmann, USAF (Ret.)
- Lieutenant General Larry Farrell, USAF (Ret.)
- General Don Hoffman, USAF (Ret.)
- General Paul Kern, USA, (Ret.)
- Rear Admiral Neil Morisetti, British Royal Navy (Ret.)
- Vice Admiral Ann E. Rondeau, USN (Ret.)
- Lieutenant General Keith J. Stalder, USMC (Ret.)
- Rear Admiral David Titley, USN (Ret.)
- General Charles F. Wald, USAF (Ret.)
- Lieutenant General Richard Zilmer, USMC (Ret.)

=== Communications Support ===
Morrow Cater, founding principal of Cater Communications, has served as a strategic communication advisor to the MAB, including managing the media release of several of their influential reports on the link between climate change, energy, and national security. Her company has also helped organize dozens of state visits featuring MAB members who discuss national security and climate change issues with policymakers, business and community leaders, and the media.

== Statements of group members ==
"After listening to leaders of the scientific, business, and governmental communities both I and my colleagues came to agree that Global Climate Change is and will be a significant threat to our National Security and in a larger sense to life on earth as we know it to be."

-General Gordon R. Sullivan, USA (Ret.), from testimony before the Select Committee On Energy Independence And Global Warming, U.S. House Of Representatives

"Unlike the problems that we are used to dealing with, these will come upon us extremely slowly, but come they will, and they will be grinding and inexorable,"

-Richard H. Truly, United States Navy vice admiral and former NASA administrator, from report of the CNA Military Advisory Board.

== See also ==
- Climate security
