= Manda Aufochs Gillespie =

Canadian writer

- Born: Dayton, Ohio, United States
- Education: Oberlin College; School of the Art Institute of Chicago
- Occupation: Author
- Website: http://thegreenmama.com

Manda Aufochs Gillespie is an ecological designer, environmental consultant, and author based on Cortes Island, British Columbia. She writes, speaks, and consults on issues related to environmental toxins and the health of children, the changing role of parents, and the importance of designing communities for children.

== Early life and education ==
Aufochs Gillespie was born in Dayton, Ohio. She immigrated with her family to Australia in 1975 but they then returned two years later. Aufochs Gillespie grew up in inner-city Columbus, Ohio where she lived on welfare with her mother and two siblings. She also lived in Chillicothe, Ohio and Hilliard, Ohio. She graduated from Oberlin College in 1998 where she studied environmental studies and politics. She received an MFA in Writing from the School of the Art Institute of Chicago in 2006.

== Career ==
In 2007, while living in Chicago, her family was profiled in the Chicago Tribune as an example of a family living an ecologically sound lifestyle. Shortly after, she began publishing a website, Green Mama. In 2009 she began holding classes in environmentally friendly parenting at the Peggy Notebaert Nature Museum in Lincoln Park.

In 2010 she moved to Vancouver, British Columbia when her husband Sadhu was hired as deputy city manager. In 2016 she moved to Cortes Island with the couple's two daughters, while her husband continued his work with the City of Vancouver, commuting frequently between Vancouver and Cortes Island by seaplane. Her first book, Green Mama: Giving your child a healthy start and a greener future, was published in June 2014 by Dundurn.

Aufochs Gillespie has appeared at Green Fest in Chicago (2014), the Wellness Show (Vancouver, 2014) and the Green Living Show (Toronto, 2015). She has also appeared on ABC, HBO, and CBC. Her articles have appeared in EcoParent Magazine and on the Vancouver Observer.

== Family ==
Aufochs Gillespie is married to Sadhu Aufochs Johnston, author and founder of the Urban Sustainability Directors Network. The couple, who met while attending Oberlin College, have two daughters.

== Books ==
- Green Mama: What Parents Need to Know to Give Their Children a Healthy Start and a Greener Future. Dundurn.com, Jun 14, 2014
- Green Mama-to-Be: Creating a Happy, Healthy, and Toxin-Free Pregnancy. Dundurn, Jul 15, 2017.
