= Eban Goodstein =

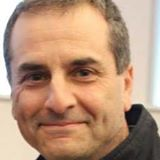
Eban Goodstein

Eban Goodstein (born 1960) is an economist, author, and public educator who directs both the Center for Environmental Policy and the MBA in Sustainability at Bard College. He is known for organizing national educational initiatives on climate change, which have engaged thousands of schools and universities, civic institutions, faith groups, and community organizations in solutions-driven dialogue. He is the author of three books and numerous journal articles. He and his wife, Chungin Chung Goodstein, live in Annandale-on-Hudson, New York. They have three daughters.

== Early life and education ==
Goodstein was born and grew up in Sewanee, Tennessee. His parents were affiliated with the Highlander Research and Education Center, a networking and skills-training institute that facilitates grassroots organizing for issues of social and environmental justice throughout Appalachia and the South. In partnership with several other families, his parents helped drive the desegregation of the Franklin Special School District in Williamson County in 1962, (one of 17 school districts in Tennessee still under court orders to unify their desegregated student bodies).

Goodstein received his B.A. from Williams College, in Williamstown, Massachusetts, and his Ph.D. in economics from the University of Michigan in Ann Arbor.

== Academic career ==
Goodstein was a professor of economics at Skidmore College and Lewis and Clark College in Portland, Oregon. In 2009 he relocated to Bard College to Direct the Center for Environmental Policy. His research centers on environmental and natural resource economics, the relationship between jobs and environmental policy, and climate economics. At Bard CEP, Goodstein launched one of the nation's first MS in Climate Science and Policy degree offerings. In 2012, with the support of Hunter Lovins, Goodstein also founded Bard's MBA in Sustainability —one of a handful of programs globally that fully integrates sustainability into a core graduate business curriculum.

In 2025, Goodstein received the Education Leadership Award from the UN Principles of Responsible Management. For a decade, he also served on the Board of the Follett Corporation.

== Climate education ==
In 1999, Goodstein founded the Green House Network, an organization dedicated to supporting the clean energy movement. As the volunteer executive director of the organization, Goodstein led a series of weekend training workshops in grassroots organization and outreach, based in part on the techniques and principles of the Highlander Center, training over 600 volunteer educators. Goodstein also set up a national speakers’ bureau of climate, energy policy, and environmental experts, preceding Vice-president Al Gore's Climate Project speaker-training initiative.

Between 2000 and 2004, Goodstein worked with Matthew Follett to produce the Race to Stop Global Warming, a 10K non-competitive footrace that involved thousands of runners and their families in eight cities across the United States. These efforts earned the Green House Network the U.S. Environmental Protection Agency (EPA)'s "Climate Saver's Award".

In the winter of 2006, a rising sense of personal urgency about the need for action led Goodstein to expand the scale of his work, and launch the first of the national teach-in initiatives, Focus the Nation. Goodstein, with his wife and the project Communications Director, Chungin Chung, spent eighteen months traveling across the country, speaking and organizing on over 150 campuses. In January 2008, over 1900 universities, schools, and civic groups nationwide participated in what amounted to one of the largest teach-in in U.S. history, involving over a million people in an event designed to educate and engage Americans in a discussion of global warming solutions. Goodstein and Chung organized a second teach-in in 2009. At Bard, Goodstein has continued to lead climate educational initiatives, including, from 2020-2026, events under the heading of WorldWide Climate and Justice Week.

At Bard, Goodstein initiated and directs the C2C Fellows Program —a national network of undergraduates and recent graduates who aspire to sustainability leadership in business and politics. C2C Fellows runs weekend skills training workshops across the country, helping young people develop paths to leadership careers from which they can make a difference in the world, while in their 20s.

== Writing ==
Goodstein's writing has appeared in a number of journals, and his research has been featured in The Chronicle of Higher Education, The Economist, The New York Times, Scientific American, Time, and USA Today. He is the author of three books: a college textbook, Economics and the Environment now in its 10th edition; The Trade-off Myth: Fact and Fiction about Jobs and the Environment. and Fighting for Love in the Century of Extinction: How Passion and Politics Can Stop Global Warming.
