= Judy Rogers =

City manager of Vancouver, British Columbia, Canada

Judy Rogers was the city manager for the City of Vancouver, British Columbia, Canada from 1999–2008 and served as a member of the board of directors of the Vancouver Organizing Committee for the 2010 Olympic and Paralympic Winter Games. She was the first female city manager of Vancouver. She was appointed the 20th Chancellor of the University of British Columbia in July 2024.

== Early life and education ==
Rogers is a native of Kimberley, British Columbia, Canada. She is one of three children. Roger's father, Bill Graham, worked in a zinc and lead mine as did Roger's Scottish born grandfather. Roger's mother, Mary, was a teacher. Rogers graduated from Selkirk Secondary in 1967 and went on to complete her undergraduate degree at the University of British Columbia in community recreation. Later she received her Masters in Public Administration from the University of Victoria.

== Vancouver city manager ==
Rogers worked for the city of Vancouver for 25 years, spending 10 years in the role of city manager. She became assistant city manager in 1994, and deputy city manager in 1996. She started the role of city manager on New Year's Day in 1999. In 2008, within one week of Vancouver Mayor Gregor Robertson taking office, Rogers was dismissed by Robertson to be replaced by Penny Ballem as head of Vancouver's civil administration, to provide a "fresh start" for Robertson's agenda. Rogers received $572,000 severance in the transition.

== UBC Chancellor ==
On 27 November 2024, Rogers was installed as the 20th Chancellor of the University of British Columbia at the Chan Centre for the Performing Arts on UBC's Point Grey Campus in the presence of the BC Lieutenant Governor and other dignitaries.

== Awards ==
Rogers was named one of Canada's Top 100 Most Powerful Women by the Women’s Executive Network for five straight years (2003–2007). She is the recipient of the Lieutenant Governour's Medal for Excellence in Public Service in BC, as well as two United Nations public service awards.

== Personal life ==
Rogers and her partner Grant Close, former Translink human-relations director, live in Vancouver, British Columbia, Canada. Rogers has two children, from a previous marriage, and two grandchildren; Jay and Graham Rogers.
