= Sadhu Aufochs Johnston =

Sadhu Aufochs Johnston was the City Manager of Vancouver, BC from March 2016 until January 2021 where he was responsible for managing the operations of the City, including oversight of a budget of over $1.6B and over 7,000 staff. As City Manager he spearheaded initiatives to address the growing housing and climate change crisis in Vancouver. He was the Chief Environmental Officer of Chicago and Deputy Chief of Staff to Mayor Richard M. Daley, until he was appointed Deputy City Manager of Vancouver, British Columbia, Canada in 2009. Johnston previously served as the Executive Director of the Cleveland Green Building Coalition. He is co-author of "The Guide to Greening Cities" published by Island Press in 2013. In 2008, Johnston co-founded the Urban Sustainability Directors Network (USDN) and served as the Chair of the Executive Committee of STAR, community sustainability rating system. Johnston served on the selection committee for the Partners for Places Fund, a partnership between USDN and the Funders Network for Smart Growth and Livable Communities as well as the Greenest City Fund in partnership with the Vancouver Foundation.

== Background ==
Johnston was born in the United Kingdom to a Canadian father and a German Jewish mother who was born in South Africa. Johnston lived in many cities around the world with his mother, a psychotherapist, who raised him in communes from India to Colorado. Although he is not of Indian heritage, he was named Sadhu as a result of his parents' extended stays in India during the 1960s and 1970s where they immersed themselves in alternative spirituality. He is a dual US and Canadian citizen who spent several summers visiting his father, who worked as a carpenter, and grandmother in Vancouver while growing up.

== Education ==
He graduated from Oberlin College in 1998 where he studied environmental studies and politics. He also studied at Vassar College.

== Chicago period ==
Johnston was appointed Chief Environmental Officer and Deputy Chief of Staff of Chicago in July 2005 by Mayor Richard M. Daley. During his time in Chicago, Johnston oversaw the development of theChicago Climate Action Plan (CCAP), one of North America's first climate plans to integrate adaptation and mitigation initiatives. Johnston was involved in the development and implementation in Chicago of green jobs, waste reduction, energy conservation, and green roof initiatives among others.

== Vancouver Deputy City Manager ==
On September 1, 2009 Penny Ballem, the city manager of Vancouver, announced that Johnston would be hired as Deputy City Manager to lead the city's environmental efforts. During his time in Vancouver, Johnston has led the development and implementation of the City of Vancouver's Greenest City Action Plan (GCAP). The plan, which has been recognized globally has 10 goal areas, with ambitious targets in areas such as carbon, green transit, green jobs, waste, food, and green buildings. Vancouver has reduced the community-wide greenhouse gas emissions by over 6% since 1990, despite an over 30% increase in the population and an over 20% increase in jobs. Johnston has supported the establishment of CityStudio, a first in the world partnership between a city and six universities and colleges to help solve urban challenges. Johnston highlighted Vancouver's efforts to improve local food infrastructure in a recent city video, which was viewed across the world. Johnston provided a presentation of GCAP to ASEAN Sustainable Development Conference in Thailand which provides a succinct overview of Vancouver's efforts.

== Vancouver City Manager ==
In September, 2015, Johnston assumed the Acting City Manager role and in March 2016, after an international search, he was announced by City Council as the next City Manager. As City Manager he was involved with a wide variety of initiatives at the city, such as the creation of major public space legacies like the Arbutus Greenway and the closure of Robson Street at the Vancouver Art Gallery to create a new plaza; addressing the housing crisis with temporary modular housing, new housing policies to create thousands of new rental units and successfully rolling out the first Empty Homes Tax in North America, which has generated tens of millions of dollars to invest in affordable housing; investments in arts, such as helping the Mural Festival transform many neighborhoods with public art; the implementation of the Greenest City Action Plan with carbon emission reductions, waste diversion programs, separated bike lanes, electric vehicle and car sharing proliferation across the city; and capital projects like the Burrard Bridge, Kilarney seniors centre, new childcare projects being built on parking garages downtown and the replacement of the Evelyne Saller Centre and Roddan Lodge in the DTES. These and many other initiatives in Vancouver are globally leading and have helped to shape other cities around the world. While taking all of this action, Vancouver was the only Canadian City to have a triple A credit rating from multiple credit rating agencies.

== Recognition and awards ==
Johnston has been recognized for his leadership in urban greening, including Crain's Chicago Business 40 under 40 and Vancouver Magazine Power 50.

== Family ==
Johnston is married to Manda Aufochs Gillespie, an environmental consultant and writer. The couple, who met while attending Oberlin College, have two daughters.
