= Joe Moore (politician) =

American politician

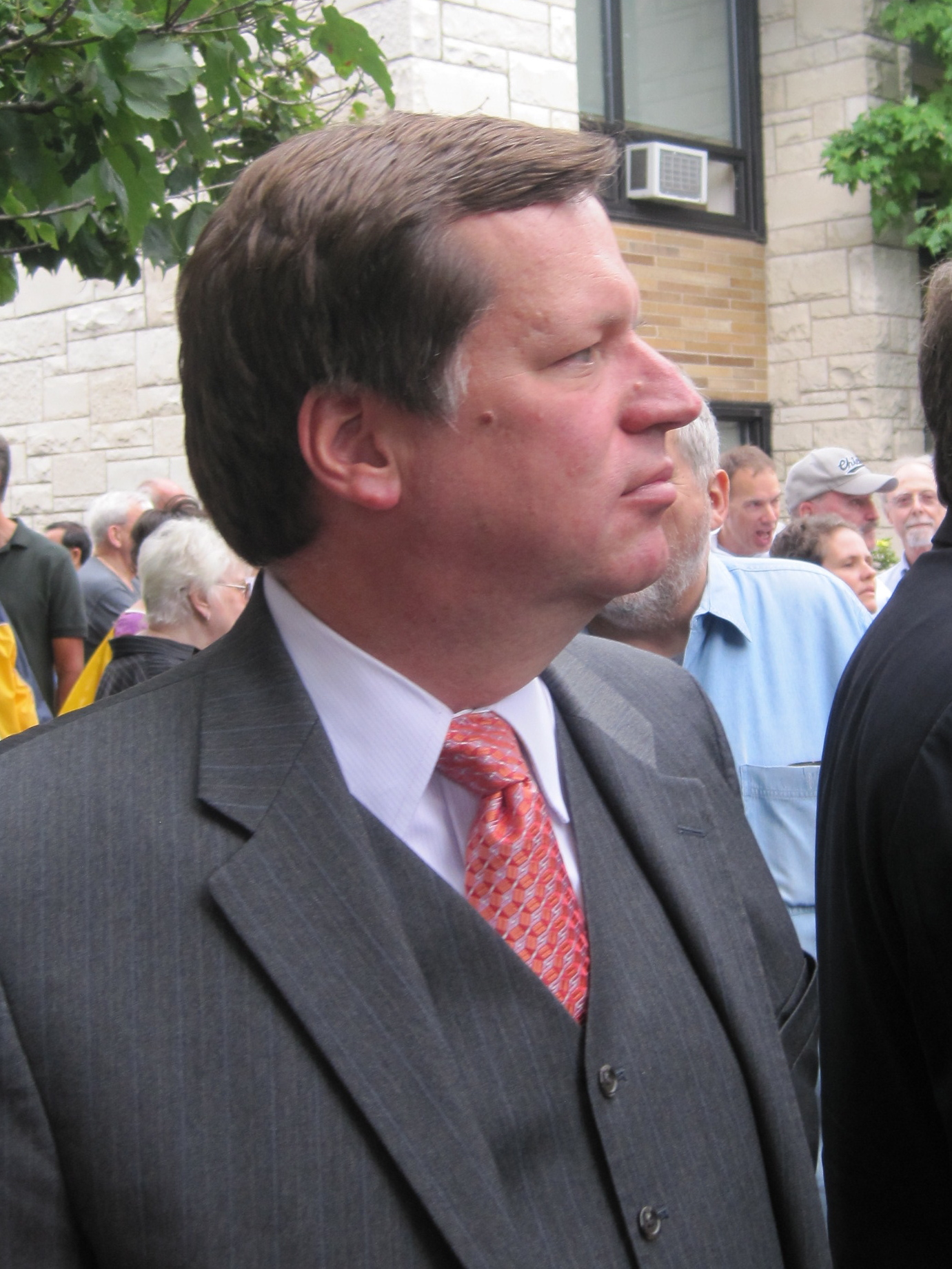
- Moore in 2009

Member of the Chicago City Council from the 49th ward
- In office April 2, 1991 – May 20, 2019
- Preceded by: Robert Clarke
- Succeeded by: Maria Hadden

Personal details
- Born: July 22, 1958 (age 68) Chicago, Illinois, U.S.
- Party: Democratic
- Spouse: Barbara Moore (m. 1982)
- Children: 2
- Education: Knox College (BA); DePaul University (JD)

Joseph A. Moore (born July 22, 1958) is a former Chicago politician. Moore was first elected to Chicago City Council as the alderman for the 49th ward, which includes the majority of Rogers Park and portions of West Ridge, in 1991. Moore won re-election six times, before losing to challenger Maria Hadden in 2019.

== Education and early career ==
Moore was born in Chicago in 1958 and later moved to Evanston, where he graduated from Evanston Township High School in 1976. He graduated from Knox College in Galesburg, Illinois with a B.A in 1980 and earned a J.D. from DePaul University College of Law in 1984. From 1984 to 1991, Moore worked as an attorney in the City of Chicago's Department of Law, first in the department's Appeals Division and later in the department's Affirmative Litigation Division, where he worked to recover millions of dollars on behalf of the City's taxpayers.

== 1991 aldermanic election campaign ==
On November 6, 1990, 49th ward alderman David Orr was elected Cook County Clerk, creating a vacancy in the Chicago City Council until the 1991 municipal elections. Chicago's Mayor appoints replacements to fill short-term vacancies in the City Council. Orr supported Moore as his replacement. Mayor Richard M. Daley appointed Robert Clarke, a law associate of Illinois State Representative Lee Preston, the 49th ward Democratic committeeman. Moore was among the challengers to Clarke in the February, 1991 municipal elections. No candidate received a majority of the votes, requiring a run-off between the top two, Moore and Clarke, in April, 1991. Orr was Moore's campaign chairman. On April 2, 1991, Moore was elected alderman. Of eight incumbent alderman who were originally appointed by Daley to fill vacancies, Clarke was the only one to fail to win re-election that year.

== Chicago City Council (1991-2019) ==
Moore won re-election in 1995, 1999, 2003, 2007, 2011 and in 2015. In 2019, Moore lost election to Maria Hadden.

He was chairman of the City Council Committee on Housing and Real Estate, which oversees City housing policy and all transactions involving City-owned real estate. Moore also served most recently on the following City Council committees: Budget and Government Operations; Education and Child Development; Finance; Health and Environmental Protection; Human Relations; Special Events, Cultural Affairs and Recreation; and Rules and Ethics.

=== Community Policing and Crime Reduction ===
Moore was a pioneer in the effort to bring community policing to Chicago. The Chicago community policing strategy involves residents and other City agencies working together to prevent crime and improve the quality of life in all of Chicago's neighborhoods. Under his leadership, the 49th Ward was selected as one of the first areas of the city to host a community policing pilot project, which resulted in a 54% reduction in serious crime over a 20-year period. Additionally, from January 1, 2013 to February 26, 2013, the 24th Police District, which includes Rogers Park and the adjacent Chicago neighborhood of West Ridge, was the only of Chicago's 22 police districts in which no one was shot. Overall, Chicago Police Department data shows the rate of all reported crimes in the 49th Ward has decreased by 48% between 2003 and 2018, 4% more than the overall decline in crime across the entire city of Chicago during the same period.

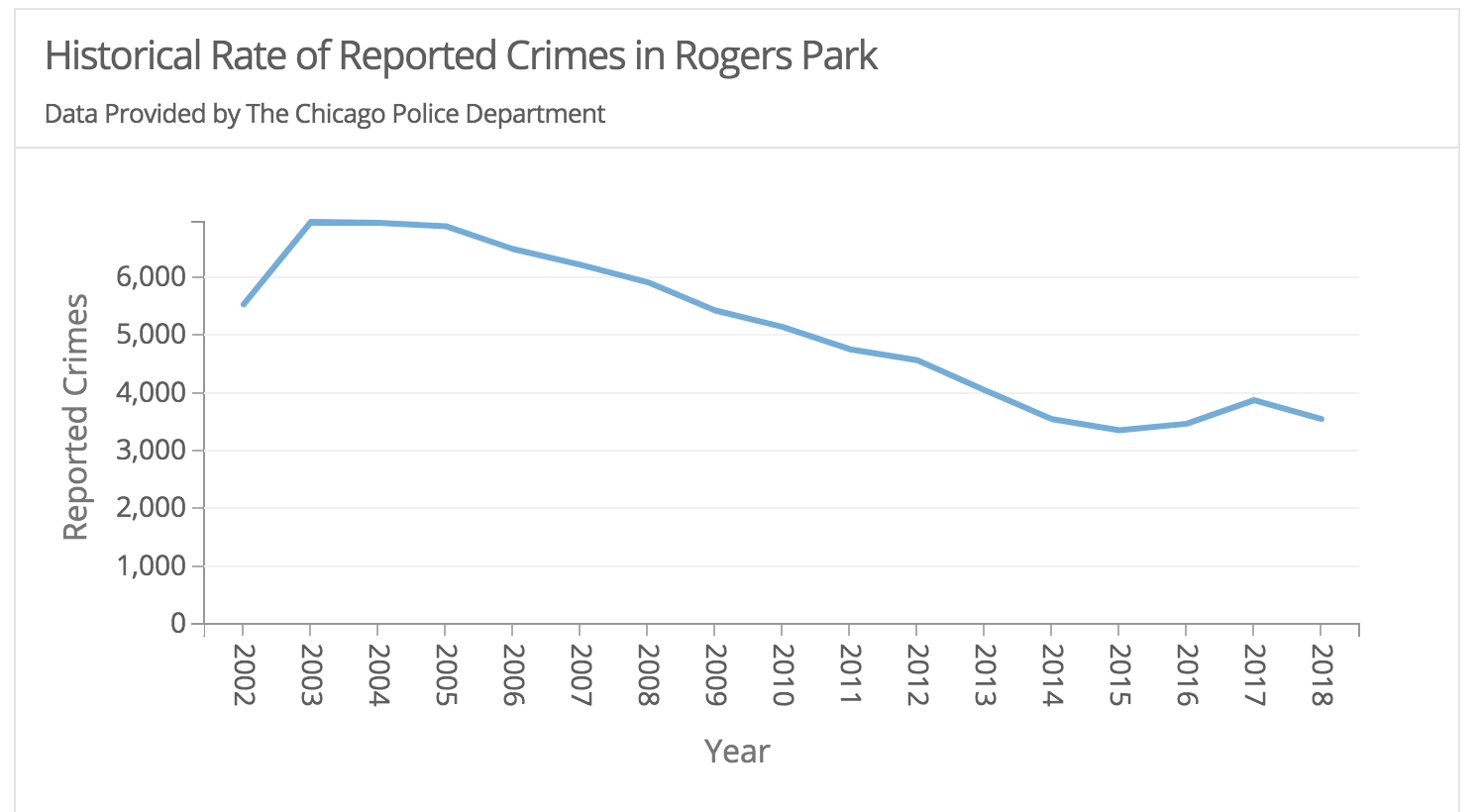
The Rate of Reported Crimes in Rogers Park from 2002 to 2018

=== Living Wage and Community Business Growth ===
Moore gained national renown as a leader in the fight for living wages when he sponsored the landmark 2006 Chicago Big Box Ordinance, which required large retail stores to pay their employees a wage sufficient to keep a family of four out of poverty. The ordinance was a precursor to Chicago's minimum wage ordinance, which guarantees all workers in Chicago a wage of at least $13 an hour indexed to inflation.

Moore made it a priority to encourage entrepreneurs to open up new restaurants and businesses in his Ward. In 2007, Moore launched an initiative dubbed "Follow Me on Friday" in which Moore encourages his constituents to join him at a local restaurant, pub, or festival twice a month after work on a Friday to promote local businesses and entrepreneurs in his Ward.

=== Participatory Budgeting ===
Moore became the first elected official in the United States to introduce a democratic budget allocation procedure known as participatory budgeting. Each year since 2009, Moore has turned over $1 million of his discretionary capital budget to a process of democratic deliberation and decision-making in which his constituents decide through direct vote how to allocate his budget. Moore's participatory budgeting model has since been adopted by eight of his Chicago City Council colleagues, as well as in 16 other U.S. cities, including New York City, Seattle, Boston, San Francisco and Vallejo, California. Over the past 9 years the 49th Ward constituents have voted to allocate Moore's discretionary capital budget to a wide array of projects ranging from resurfacing alleys and streets to beautifying the neighborhood through the creation of murals and planting of trees throughout the neighborhood.

Year	Participatory Budgeting Projects During Moore's Tenure
2018	Residents voted for 62.6% of the $1 million allocated for PB ($626,000) to be devoted to street and alley resurfacing and sidewalk repairs. Voters decided the remaining fund be allocated to planting one hundred new trees, bus benches, artistic murals on CTA embankment walls and Metra viaducts, a public plaza/stage in Touhy Park, and partial funding for an artificial turf field and running track at Sullivan High School.
2017	Residents voted for 63.9% of the $1 million allocated for PB ($630,900) to be devoted to street and alley resurfacing and sidewalk repairs. Voters decided the remaining funds be allocated to planting one hundred new trees, a learning garden at Gale Academy, updated Clark streetlights, and a heat lamp shelter with benches at Red Line stations throughout the Ward.
2016	Residents voted for 65.13% of the $1 million allocated for PB ($650,130) to be devoted to street and alley resurfacing and sidewalk repairs. Voters decided the remaining funds be allocated to planting one hundred new trees, new lights around Sullivan and Kilmer schools, improvements at Dubkin, Paschen and Loyola Parks, and new residential streetlights on Greenview.
2015	Residents voted for 62% of the $1 million allocated for PB ($620,000) to be devoted to street and alley resurfacing and sidewalk repairs. Voters decided the remaining funds be allocated to planting one hundred new trees, and park improvements throughout the Ward (new water fountains and gates).
2014	Residents voted for 69% of the $1 million allocated for PB ($690,000) to be devoted to street and alley resurfacing and sidewalk repairs. Voters decided the remaining funds be allocated to new bus stop benches, replacing the 15-Year-Old carpet at the Rogers Park Library, a new water feature at Pottawattomie Park, and a beach path extension at Hartigan Beach.
2013	Residents voted for 62% of the $1 million allocated for PB ($620,000) to be devoted to street and alley resurfacing and sidewalk repairs. Voters decided the remaining funds be allocated to urgent sidewalk repairs, Cobblestone Restoration on Glenwood, Sheridan Road pedestrian safety engineering study, Touhy Park cherry blossom trees and water fountain, and shared bike lanes on Clark from Howard to Albion.
2012	Residents voted for 53% of the $1 million allocated for PB ($530,000) to be devoted to street and alley resurfacing and sidewalk repairs. Voters decided the remaining funds be allocated to planting one hundred new trees, urgent sidewalk repairs, a new playground at Touhy Park, and the Creation of new murals at over 20 unpainted CTA and Metra viaducts and the CTA embankment in Dubkin Park.
2011	Residents voted for 57.2% of the $1 million allocated for PB ($570,200) to be devoted to street and alley resurfacing and sidewalk repairs. Voters decided the remaining funds be allocated to improvements to Ridge, Touhy, Rogers intersection, creation of new bike lanes and bike racks, improvements to Metra underpasses at Birchwood, Estes and Touhy, new playground at Touhy Park, path extensions at Jarvis, Leone and Loyola Parks.
2010	Residents voted to allocated $1.3 million to sidewalk repairs, bike lanes, Dog Friendly Area at Pottawattomie Park, Community Gardens in Dubkin Park and Pottawattomie Park, underpass murals, traffic/pedestrian signal on Clark at Chase, artistic multifunctional bike racks, additional benches and shelters on CTA "El" platforms, street resurfacing, solar-powered garbage containers on Sheridan, convenience showers at Loyola Park Beach, completion of path in Touhy Park, Rogers Park historical signs, and residential street lighting.

=== Affordable Housing ===
In 2016, Moore worked with a private developer and the CHA to construct 65 units of affordable housing and 46 market rate units above a new Target on North Sheridan Road. In 2017, Moore helped a developer secure City of Chicago Low Income Housing Tax Credits to build 54 affordable housing units on top of 3,300 square feet of retail storefront space at Clark and Estes. In 2018, Moore convinced the Chicago Housing Authority (CHA) to purchase Levy House at 1221 W. Sherwin, thus preserving 56 units affordable senior housing.

Name	Location	Zoning Approval/Completion Date	Notes
Clark-Estes Apartments	Corner of Clark and Estes	October 2018 (Completed)	42 units reserved for residents at or below 60% of area median income ($35,580 a year for a single person, $50,760 a year for a family of four) and 12 units will be reserved for residents with incomes at or below 30% of area median income ($17,790 a year for a single person, $25,380 for a family of four).
Transit-Oriented Development	1730 W. Greenleaf	Zoning approved by Alderman Moore in 2017	Three units (of the thirty total new units) will be affordable to households earning no more than 60% of the area median income ($33,180 for a single-member household, $37,290 for a two-member household). Green roof will also be added to the building.
Concord at Sheridan	Corner of Sheridan and Devon	Planned Completion in 2019	Sixty percent of the units (65 units) will be reserved for CHA residents and the remaining 40 percent (46 units) will be rented at market rates.
6413 N. Glenwood	6413 N. Glenwood	Zoning approved by Alderman Moore in 2015	Creation of one new unit of affordable housing and a fully ADA compliant disabled parking spot in the rear portion of the lot.
6453-55 N. Newgard	6453-55 N. Newgard	Zoning approved by Alderman Moore in 2015	Creation of two new affordable housing units.

Moore has actively opposed an elected school board in City Council, maneuvering to block a ballot measure.

Despite 49th ward residents voting overwhelmingly to freeze charter school expansion, Moore has ignored his constituents and continued to push for more charters as he collects campaign donations from Charter operators.

Rogers Park's schools have suffered under Moore, to the point of Gale Elementary's major issue with lead contamination Since 1993, only $81.5 million for improvements to Roger's Park schools have been allocated by CPS, including modernization efforts at Sullivan High School, and a $5 million investment for a new roof at Kilmer School.

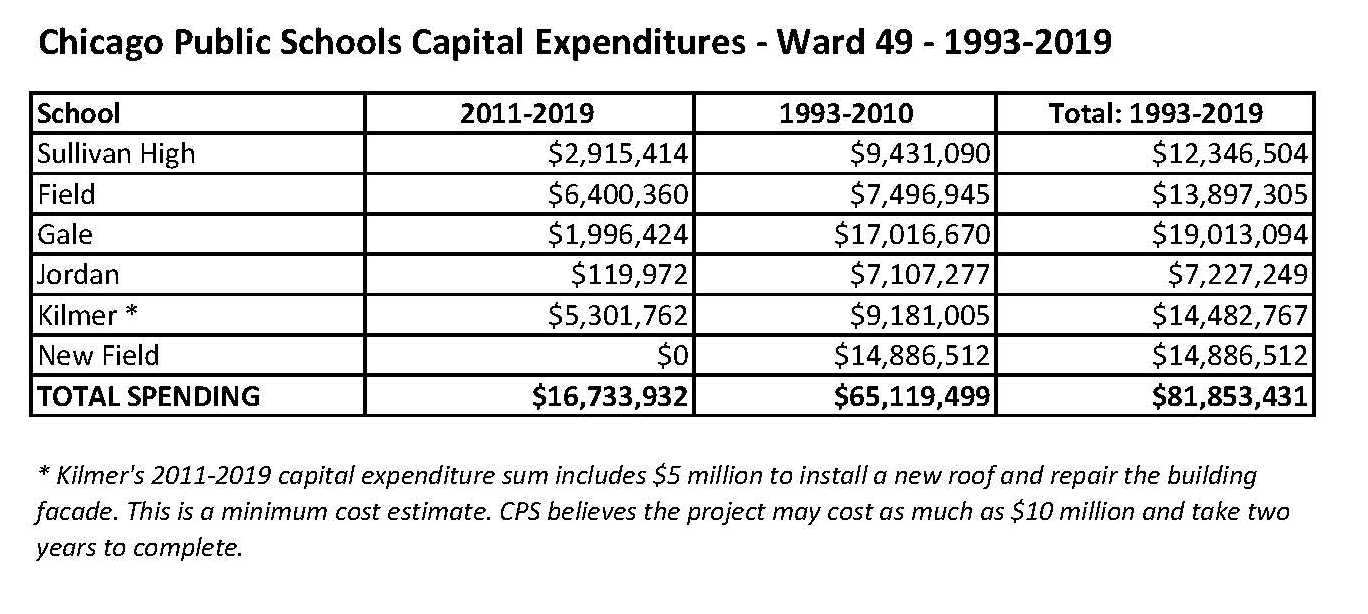
Chicago Public Schools Capital Expenditures - Ward 49 - 1993-2019

=== Community Outreach and Annual Events ===
Throughout his time as Alderman, Moore has overseen the creation of a number of annual events held in Rogers Park. One the oldest of these annual events is the Rogers Park Back to School Picnic which is held on the last Sunday of every August. The picnic has grown considerably since its founding in 1991 to include activities directed at a wide audience such as face painting, live music, bingo, and bouncy castles in addition to free food and school supplies.

Also founded by Moore, is the 49th Ward Annual Spring Clean-up and Taste of Roger's Park. Normally held on the Saturday before Earth Day, the annual clean-up brings together volunteers from across the neighborhood who either choose clean-up and/or beautification projects they wish to undertake or are directed by Alderman's office to areas of the Ward that need cleaning. At the end of the day participants are then given free food from restaurants around the ward to help promote local business growth.

Additionally Moore has also overseen the creation and implementation of several other annual (sometimes biannual) events listed in the table below.

Annual Event Founded by Moore	Number of Years Running	Time of Year Held	Description
Follow Me on Friday	9	Last Friday of Each Month	Free Liquor and Free beer is served by Alderman Moore and the 49th Ward staff at nearby businesses like banks and coffee shops.
Rogers Park Back to School Picnic	28	Last Sunday of August	Free food and school supplies are handed out and a large number of activities are available (face painting, live music, bingo, etc.).
49th Ward Annual Spring Clean-up and Taste of Roger's Park	28	Saturday before Earth Day	Volunteers from across Rogers Park come together to help clean the neighborhood and work on beautification projects. Afterwards participants are provided free food from businesses across the ward.
49th Ward Job Fair + Employment Resource Fair	10	May	Employers representing a wide variety of companies and organizations are brought in by Moore's office to network and accept applications from Rogers Park residents. Workshops are also offered on resume writing and job preparation.
49th Ward Community Bike Ride	6	Summer	Bike riders (from experts to novices) bike with the Alderman and staff on a predetermined tour of Rogers Park.
Free Valentine's Day Movie	28	Weekend around Valentine's Day	A Free event featuring an assortment of kids’ movies, with complimentary soda and popcorn.
49th Ward Second Chance Adult and Juvenile Expungement Summit	3	Fall	Under Illinois law, qualified individuals may apply to "expunge" or "seal" certain criminal cases, thereby removing them from their criminal history records. At the summit, volunteer attorneys from Cabrini Green Legal Aid assist individuals in filling out applications for petitions for expungement and sealing and address any other legal concerns.
49th Ward Community Pet Day	4	Summer	Residents are invited to bring their pets for low cost vaccinations, city of Chicago Dog registration, nail trims, free microchips and dog tags, and other activities/offerings.
Satellite Service Office tour	12	Twice annually (usually in Spring and Fall)	Alderman Moore visits transit stops, coffee shops, and community events at over a dozen locations throughout the neighborhood where he invites constituents to bring up issues and concerns they have about the community.

=== National Recognition ===
During Moore's tenure, Rogers Park and Alderman Moore himself have garnered national recognition and attention. In 2008, John Nichols, Washington, D.C. correspondent for The Nation, blogging on The Nation website, named Moore "Most Valuable Local Official." Also, In its July 2016 cover story, Time included Participatory Budgeting (pioneered by Moore) as one of the "240 reasons to celebrate America right now." Additionally, a national real estate website named Rogers Park as the top neighborhood in Chicago and one of the top neighborhoods in the nation for "living well." The website, Trulia, conducted a survey of 877 neighborhoods across the U.S., and named Rogers Park the 11th best neighborhood to live in the nation for staying active and healthy, ahead of all other Chicago neighborhoods.

In addition to serving as Alderman of the 49th Ward, Moore is a former chair of the Board of Directors of the Democratic Municipal Organization, a national association of elected municipal officials, with offices in his home in Rogers Park. Moore's wife, Barbara, is the Executive Director.

=== Foie gras ban ===
Moore was the chief sponsor of an ordinance banning the sale of foie gras in Chicago. After much publicity, the ordinance passed overwhelmingly but was repealed overwhelmingly. Moore was honored in February, 2007 by the Humane Society of the United States for his leadership on the issue of cruelty to animals. Moore's support of this issue was the subject of many widespread and derisive comments. National news organizations covered the story from many angles, some hospitable and some hostile.

== Electoral history ==
Chicago 49th ward aldermanic election, 2019: General
Party	Candidate	Votes	%
Nonpartisan	Maria Hadden	7,820	63.40
Nonpartisan	Joe Moore (incumbent)	4,514	36.60
Total votes		12,334	100.00

Chicago 49th ward aldermanic election, 2015: General
Party	Candidate	Votes	%
Nonpartisan	Joe Moore (incumbent)	5,778	66.84
Nonpartisan	Don Gordon	2,867	33.16
Total votes		8,645	100.00

Chicago 49th ward aldermanic election, 2011: General
Party	Candidate	Votes	%
Nonpartisan	Joe Moore (incumbent)	6,929	72.05
Nonpartisan	Brian White	2,688	27.95
Total votes		9,628	100.00

Chicago 49th ward aldermanic election, 2007: Run-off
Party	Candidate	Votes	%
Nonpartisan	Joe Moore (incumbent)	4,027	51.61
Nonpartisan	Don Gordon	3,776	48.39
Total votes		7,803	100.00

Chicago 49th ward aldermanic election, 2007: General
Party	Candidate	Votes	%
Nonpartisan	Joe Moore (incumbent)	3,668	49.29
Nonpartisan	Don Gordon	2,171	29.18
Nonpartisan	Jim Ginderske	943	12.67
Nonpartisan	Chris Adams	659	8.86
Total votes		7,461	100.00

Chicago 49th ward aldermanic election, 2003: General
Party	Candidate	Votes	%
Nonpartisan	Joe Moore (incumbent)	3,693	54.74
Nonpartisan	Michael J. Harrington	1,825	27.05
Nonpartisan	Tom Bradley	1,228	18.20
Total votes		6,746	100.00

Clerk of the Circuit Court of Cook County, 2000: Democratic primary
Party	Candidate	Votes	%
Democratic	Dorothy A. Brown	222,716	48.54
Democratic	Patrick J. Levar	126,515	27.57
Democratic	Patricia Young	57,957	12.63
Democratic	Joe Moore	51,673	11.26
Total votes		458,861	100.00
