= List of things named after George W. Bush =

43rd President of the United States

This is a list of things named after George W. Bush, the 43rd president of the United States.

== Schools ==
- George W. Bush Elementary School in St. Paul, Texas
- George W. Bush Elementary School in Stockton, CA

== Libraries ==
- George W. Bush Presidential Center in Dallas, Texas

== Fashion ==
- Bush Shoes - a Crocs-style shoe named after Bush by Taiwan residents

== Roads ==
- President George W. Bush Bridge across the Red River border between Oklahoma and Texas
- George Walker Bush Highway in Accra, Ghana
- George W. Bush Street in Tbilisi, Georgia
- George W. Bush Street in Tirana, Albania
- George W. Bush Plaza in central Jerusalem

== Ships ==
- A future Ford-Class aircraft carrier will be named the USS George W. Bush

== See also ==
- Presidential memorials in the United States
- List of places named for George Washington
- List of places named for Thomas Jefferson
- List of places named for James Monroe
- List of places named for Andrew Jackson
- List of places named for James K. Polk
- List of things named after Ronald Reagan
- List of things named after George H. W. Bush
- List of things named after Bill Clinton
- List of things named after Barack Obama
- List of things named after Donald Trump
- List of educational institutions named after presidents of the United States
