= List of things named after George H. W. Bush =

Things named after the 41st president of the United States

This is a list of things named after George H. W. Bush, the 41st president of the United States.

== Schools ==
- George Herbert Walker Bush Elementary School in Addison, Texas
- George Bush High School in Richmond, Texas
- Bush School of Government and Public Service at Texas A&M University in College Station, Texas

== Libraries ==
- George H.W. Bush Presidential Library and Museum in College Station, Texas

== Buildings ==
- George Bush Center for Intelligence in Langley, Virginia. Bush served as the Director of Central Intelligence from 1976 to 1977.
- George H.W. Bush State Office Building in Austin, Texas. Scheduled to be completed in 2022
- George H.W. Bush and George W. Bush United States Courthouse and George Mahon Federal Building in Midland, Texas

== Airport ==
- George Bush Intercontinental Airport in Houston, Texas

== Roads ==
- George Bush Drive West in College Station, Texas, where the George H.W. Bush Presidential Library and Museum is located.
- President George Bush Turnpike in Dallas, Texas. The 52-mile toll road runs through several Dallas suburbs, forming a partial loop around the city.

== Parks ==
- George Bush Park in Houston, Texas
- Bush Plaza, US Embassy, Clayallee in Berlin, Germany

== Ships ==
- USS George H. W. Bush (CVN-77) The Nimitz-class supercarrier of the United States Navy is named for Former President George H. W. Bush, who was a naval aviator during World War II.

== Trains ==
- Union Pacific 4141

== Other ==
- Bushism (introduced by his son George W. Bush)

== See also ==
- List of awards and honors received by George H. W. Bush
- Presidential memorials in the United States
- List of places named for George Washington
- List of places named for Thomas Jefferson
- List of places named for James Monroe
- List of places named for Andrew Jackson
- List of places named for James K. Polk
- List of things named after Ronald Reagan
- List of things named after Bill Clinton
- List of things named after George W. Bush
- List of things named after Barack Obama
- List of things named after Donald Trump
- List of educational institutions named after presidents of the United States
