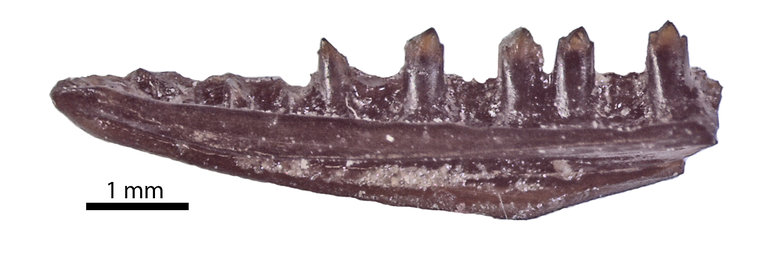
- A jaw fossil of Obamadon gracilis

Scientific classification
- Kingdom: Animalia
- Phylum: Chordata
- Class: Reptilia
- Order: Squamata
- Clade: †Polyglyphanodontia
- Genus: †Obamadon; Longrich et al., 2013

Type species
- †Obamadon gracilis Longrich et al., 2013

= Obamadon =

Obamadon Temporal range: Late Cretaceous, 66 Ma

Extinct genus of lizards

Obamadon is an extinct genus of polyglyphanodontian lizards from the Late Cretaceous of North America. Fossils have been found in the Hell Creek Formation of Montana and the Lance Formation of Wyoming. Researchers describe it as being distinguished by its "tall, slender teeth with large central cusps separated from small accessory cusps by lingual grooves." The type species was named Obamadon gracilis after United States president Barack Obama, "in reference to the tall, straight teeth, and the manner in which Mr. Obama has acted as a role model of good oral hygiene for the world." According to Nicholas R. Longrich of Yale University, the species "was probably a foot long, [and] with these tall, slender teeth it used to eat insects and plant matter."

The lizard was identified as part of a search of museum collections to find snake and lizard species that had lived immediately prior to the Cretaceous–Paleogene extinction event, in which the dinosaurs (with the exception of birds) died out. Its identification was published by Longrich, Bhullar and Gauthier in a paper titled "Mass extinction of lizards and snakes at the Cretaceous–Paleogene boundary", published on December 10, 2012 in Proceedings of the National Academy of Sciences. The scientists found that lizards and snakes had been more badly hit by the mass extinction than previously thought, with 83 percent of species – including Obamadon – dying out. All present-day species of lizards are descended from members of the surviving 17 percent.

== Etymology ==
Obamadon is not the first organism to be named after U.S. President Barack Obama. Other researchers have given his name to Etheostoma obama, the spangled darter or "Obamafish", and the lichen Caloplaca obamae. Longrich denied any political intent in the nomenclature, telling Politico that "we're just having fun with taxonomy", but commented that if the 2012 United States Presidential election had gone a different way he probably would not have used the name, as "it might have seemed like we were mocking it, naming a lizard that goes extinct after that, seemed kind of cruel." According to Longrich, he came up with the idea after the 2008 election: "when everything was all hope-y and change-y, we said we should name a dinosaur after him and call it the Obamadon."

The holotype of this taxon was documented in the original 2012 paper but not explicitly identified in the text, which meant that Obamadon was not validly named in the 2012 paper. It was designated in the correction published in 2013, validating Obamadon.

== Description ==
Obamadon is known from two lower jaw fragments, each less than a centimeter in length. One was found in the collections of the University of California Museum of Paleontology after having been collected from the Hell Creek Formation in Montana, and the other collected from the Lance Formation in Wyoming. When it was first named in 2012, Obamadon was identified as a member of the extinct group Polyglyphanodontia on the basis of a V-shaped connection between the two halves of the lower jaw, a slot-and-ridge type connection between the dentary bone of the lower jaw and another missing bone called the splenial bone, and teeth that are implanted within the jaw bone. Its jaw is thin and straight, unlike the curved jaws of most other polyglyphanodontians. Obamadon is estimated to have been about 30 cm (1 foot) in length and may have preyed on insects.

== Classification ==
Obamadon is a primitive member of Polyglyphanodontia, a clade of lizards that became extinct after the Cretaceous–Paleogene extinction event. Its jaw material was once assigned to Leptochamops, a more derived genus of polyglyphanodontian.

- Squamata
  - - Lamiasaurus
    - Iguanidae
  - - Polyglyphanodontia
      - Tripennaculus
      - Obamadon
      - Polyglyphanodon
      - - Leptochamops
        - - Peneteius
          - Laramie lizard
          - Meniscognathus
          - - - Chamops
              - Haptosphenus
            - - Socognathus
              - Stypodontosaurus
              - Frenchman lizard
    - - Sweetwater lizard
      - Scincomorpha
      - - Xenosauridae
        - - Anguidae
          - - Litakis
            - Colpodontosaurus
            - Platynota
            - Ophidia

== See also ==
- List of things named after Barack Obama
- List of organisms named after famous people (born 1950–1974)
