= List of things named after Bill Clinton =

42nd President of the United States

This is a list of things named after Bill Clinton, the 42nd president of the United States.

== Schools ==
- Clinton School of Public Service at the University of Arkansas in Fayetteville, Arkansas

== Libraries ==
- Clinton Presidential Center in Little Rock, Arkansas

== Institutions ==
- Clinton Foundation

== Airport ==
- Clinton National Airport in Little Rock

== Roads ==
- Bill Clinton Boulevard in Pristina, Kosovo

== Buildings ==
- The Clinton Centre in Enniskillen, Northern Ireland
- William Jefferson Clinton Federal Building headquarters to the EPA in Washington, D.C.

== Ships ==
- A future Ford-Class aircraft carrier will be named the USS William J. Clinton

== Species ==
- Klintonka, a slang name of a species of black fly that appeared in Serbia after its bombing in 1999

== See also ==
- Presidential memorials in the United States
- List of places named for George Washington
- List of places named for Thomas Jefferson
- List of places named for James Monroe
- List of places named for Andrew Jackson
- List of places named for James K. Polk
- List of things named after Ronald Reagan
- List of things named after George H. W. Bush
- List of things named after George W. Bush
- List of things named after Barack Obama
- List of things named after Donald Trump
- List of educational institutions named after presidents of the United States
