= List of memorials to James K. Polk =

This is a list of places named for James K. Polk, the 11th president of the United States.

== Buildings and structures ==
- President James K. Polk Home & Museum, Polk's young adult home in Columbia, Tennessee
- Polk Place, Polk's now-demolished home in Nashville, Tennessee
- President James K. Polk Historic Site, historic reconstruction of the cabin Polk was born in.
- Presidents North Carolina Gave the Nation, a statue also featuring Andrew Jackson and Andrew Johnson that stands on the grounds of the North Carolina State Capitol in Raleigh, North Carolina

== Ships ==
- USS James K. Polk (SSBN-645)
- USS President Polk (AP-103)

== Counties ==
- Polk County, Arkansas
- Polk County, Florida
- Polk County, Georgia
- Polk County, Iowa
- Polk County, Minnesota
- Polk County, Nebraska
- Polk County, Oregon
- Polk County, Tennessee
- Polk County, Texas
- Polk County, Wisconsin

=== Note ===
Polk County, Missouri, was named after Ezekiel Polk, President Polk's grandfather. Polk County, North Carolina, was named after Col. William Polk, President Polk's first cousin, once removed, who fought in the American Revolutionary War.

== Cities ==
- Polk City, Florida
- Polk City, Iowa
- Polkville, Mississippi

== Boroughs ==
- Polk Borough, Venango County, Pennsylvania

== Townships ==
- Polk Township, Crawford County, Ohio
- Polkton Township, Michigan

== University locations ==
- Polk Place at the University of North Carolina at Chapel Hill

== See also ==
- Bibliography of James K. Polk
- Presidential memorials in the United States
- List of places named for George Washington
- List of places named for Thomas Jefferson
- List of places named for James Monroe
- List of places named for Andrew Jackson
- List of things named after Ronald Reagan
- List of things named after George Bush
- List of things named after Bill Clinton
- List of things named after Barack Obama

== Other ==
- Polk Street, Chicago
- Polk Street, San Francisco
- James K. Polk Elementary School, a public elementary school for grades K-5 in Alexandria, Virginia
- James K. Polk Elementary School, a public elementary school for grades K-6 in Fresno, California
- "James K. Polk" is the title of a song by They Might Be Giants, on their album Factory Showroom.
