= Barack Obama (disambiguation) =

Barack Obama (born 1961) served as the 44th president of the United States from 2009 to 2017.

Barack Obama may also refer to:

- Barack Obama Sr. (1934–1982), a Kenyan senior governmental economist and the father of Barack Obama, former president of the United States
- Barack Obama in comics, a character portrayed in several comics, often portraying the former president
- President Barack Obama (painting), a 2018 portrait of Barack Obama by the artist Kehinde Wiley for the National Portrait Gallery
- Presidency of Barack Obama, the period of time from January 20, 2009 – January 20, 2017 with Barack Obama as president
- Barack Obama: Der schwarze Kennedy, a German-language biography of President Barack Obama
- Barack Obama (horse) (1998–2018), Anglo-Arabian racehorse

== See also ==
- List of topics related to Barack Obama
- List of things named after Barack Obama
- Barack (disambiguation)
- Obama (disambiguation)
