= Monroe Township =

Monroe Township may refer to:

== Arkansas ==
- Monroe Township, Mississippi County, Arkansas, in Mississippi County, Arkansas
- Monroe Township, Sevier County, Arkansas, in Sevier County, Arkansas

== Illinois ==
- Monroe Township, Ogle County, Illinois

== Indiana ==
- Monroe Township, Adams County, Indiana
- Monroe Township, Allen County, Indiana
- Monroe Township, Carroll County, Indiana
- Monroe Township, Clark County, Indiana
- Monroe Township, Delaware County, Indiana
- Monroe Township, Grant County, Indiana
- Monroe Township, Howard County, Indiana
- Monroe Township, Jefferson County, Indiana
- Monroe Township, Kosciusko County, Indiana
- Monroe Township, Madison County, Indiana
- Monroe Township, Morgan County, Indiana
- Monroe Township, Pike County, Indiana
- Monroe Township, Pulaski County, Indiana
- Monroe Township, Putnam County, Indiana
- Monroe Township, Randolph County, Indiana
- Monroe Township, Washington County, Indiana

== Iowa ==
- Monroe Township, Benton County, Iowa
- Monroe Township, Butler County, Iowa
- Monroe Township, Fremont County, Iowa
- Monroe Township, Johnson County, Iowa
- Monroe Township, Linn County, Iowa
- Monroe Township, Madison County, Iowa
- Monroe Township, Mahaska County, Iowa
- Monroe Township, Monroe County, Iowa
- Monroe Township, Ringgold County, Iowa
- Monroe Township, Shelby County, Iowa
- Monroe Township, Wayne County, Iowa

== Kansas ==
- Monroe Township, Anderson County, Kansas

== Michigan ==
- Monroe Township, Michigan, in Newaygo County
- Monroe Charter Township, Michigan, in Monroe County
- Munro Township, Michigan, in Cheboygan County

== Minnesota ==
- Monroe Township, Lyon County, Minnesota

== Missouri ==
- Monroe Township, Andrew County, Missouri
- Monroe Township, Daviess County, Missouri
- Monroe Township, Lincoln County, Missouri
- Monroe Township, Livingston County, Missouri
- Monroe Township, Monroe County, Missouri
- Monroe Township, Nodaway County, Missouri

== Nebraska ==
- Monroe Township, Platte County, Nebraska

== New Jersey ==
- Monroe Township, Gloucester County, New Jersey
- Monroe Township, Middlesex County, New Jersey

== North Carolina ==
- Monroe Township, Guilford County, North Carolina, in Guilford County, North Carolina
- Monroe Township, Union County, North Carolina, in Union County, North Carolina

== North Dakota ==
- Monroe Township, Towner County, North Dakota, in Towner County, North Dakota

== Ohio ==
- Monroe Township, Adams County, Ohio
- Monroe Township, Allen County, Ohio
- Monroe Township, Ashtabula County, Ohio
- Monroe Township, Carroll County, Ohio
- Monroe Township, Clermont County, Ohio
- Monroe Township, Coshocton County, Ohio
- Monroe Township, Darke County, Ohio
- Monroe Township, Guernsey County, Ohio
- Monroe Township, Harrison County, Ohio
- Monroe Township, Henry County, Ohio
- Monroe Township, Holmes County, Ohio
- Monroe Township, Knox County, Ohio
- Monroe Township, Licking County, Ohio
- Monroe Township, Logan County, Ohio
- Monroe Township, Madison County, Ohio
- Monroe Township, Miami County, Ohio
- Monroe Township, Muskingum County, Ohio
- Monroe Township, Perry County, Ohio
- Monroe Township, Pickaway County, Ohio
- Monroe Township, Preble County, Ohio
- Monroe Township, Putnam County, Ohio
- Monroe Township, Richland County, Ohio

== Pennsylvania ==
- Monroe Township, Bedford County, Pennsylvania
- Monroe Township, Bradford County, Pennsylvania
- Monroe Township, Clarion County, Pennsylvania
- Monroe Township, Cumberland County, Pennsylvania
- Monroe Township, Juniata County, Pennsylvania
- Monroe Township, Snyder County, Pennsylvania
- Monroe Township, Wyoming County, Pennsylvania

== South Dakota ==
- Monroe Township, Turner County, South Dakota, in Turner County, South Dakota
