= List of Chicago placename etymologies =

Source of the place names in the U.S. city of Chicago, Illinois.

Place Name	Source	Route Designation
Adams Street	John Quincy Adams, sixth President of the United States	
Addison Street	Thomas Addison, English doctor, discoverer of Addison's disease	
Altgeld Gardens	John Peter Altgeld (1847-1902), Governor of Illinois from 1893-1897.	
Andersonville	Named for the Andersonville School, which in turn was named for Reverend Paul Andersen Norland	
Archer Avenue	Col. William Beatty Archer, the first commissioner of the Illinois and Michigan Canal	IL 171
Archer Heights	Named for Archer Avenue (see above)	
Armitage Avenue	Thomas Armitage, founder of the American Bible Union	
Artesian Avenue	A productive artesian well on the corner of Chicago Avenue and Western Avenue	
Ashburn	The community served as a dumping ground in the 1800s and turn of the last century for ashes collected from Chicagoans' fireplaces and coal-fired furnaces.	
Ashland Avenue	The Ashland estate of Kentucky statesman Henry Clay	
Austin	Businessman and real estate speculator Henry W. Austin.	
Avalon Park	Named for the Avalon Park Community Church, formerly called Pennytown after a shopkeeper.	
Back of the Yards	Named for its location near the Union Stock Yards.	
Balbo Drive	Named after Italian Politician and former Marshal of Airforce, Italo Balbo.	
Beach Avenue	Real estate developer E. A. Beach	
Belmont Avenue	Battle of Belmont	
Blue Island Avenue	Led to Blue Island, a ridge of land that appeared to be an island to pioneers	
Bowmanville	Early settler Jessie Bowman sold lots that he did not own, then fled	
Bridgeport	Claimed to be for a bridge over the Illinois and Michigan Canal, although there is no evidence that the bridge ever existed.	
Brighton Park	Either for the cattle market in Brighton, Massachusetts, or for Brighton Racecourse in England	
Broadway	Named for the New York City Broadway, formerly known as Evanston Avenue.	
Bubbly Creek	The creek derives its name from the gases bubbling out of the riverbed from the decomposition of blood and entrails dumped into the river in the early 20th century by the local meatpacking businesses surrounding the Union Stock Yards.	
Bucktown	Residents kept goats in their yards	
Burnside	General Ambrose Burnside	
Calhoun Place	Not, as is commonly believed, for U.S. Vice President John C. Calhoun, but rather John Calhoun, who published Chicago's first newspaper, the Chicago Democrat.	
Calumet River	Calumet is a Norman-French, colonial-era word often used by colonists for a Native American ceremonial pipe	
Canaryville	Refers to the sparrows who fed in the stockyards and railroad cars in the late 19th century. The name may also refer to youth gangs in the neighborhood, who were known as "wild canaries".	
Central Park Avenue	Refers to the original name of Garfield Park.	
Cermak Road	Slain Chicago mayor Anton Cermak (formerly 22nd Street)	
Chicago	A French rendering of the Miami-Illinois name shikaakwa, meaning wild leek.	
Cicero Avenue	Roman statesman Marcus Tullius Cicero	IL 50 / IL 83
Clark Street	George Rogers Clark	
Clinton Street	DeWitt Clinton	
Clybourn Avenue	Archibald Clybourn, the first police constable of Chicago	
Columbus Drive	Christopher Columbus	
Constance Avenue	Konstanz, Germany	
Cook County	The county in which Chicago is situated was named after Daniel Pope Cook, who served as the second U.S. Representative from Illinois and the first Attorney General of the State of Illinois	
Cottage Grove Avenue	A small cottage in a charming grove.	
Damen Avenue	Father Arnold Damen, founder of St. Ignatius College Preparatory School	
Dan Ryan Expressway	Dan Ryan Jr., former president of the Cook County Board of Commissioners	
Dearborn Park and Dearborn Street	named for Fort Dearborn which was built on the present day site of Chicago, which in turn was named for General Henry Dearborn, American Revolutionary War veteran and Secretary of War under Thomas Jefferson.	
DeKoven Street	John DeKoven (founder of Northern Trust)	
Deming Place	Frederick Deming, a subdivider in 1860	
Devon Avenue	Named by developer John Lewis Cochran after Devon station on the Main Line north of Philadelphia.	CR 6
Diversey Parkway	Beer brewer and alderman Michael Diversey	
Douglass Park	Anna and Frederick Douglass	
Dunning	Andrew Dunning, a real estate speculator	
DuSable Park	Jean Baptiste Point du Sable, first non-native resident of Chicago.	
Edison Park	Thomas Edison, inventor	
Edgebrook	Refers to the edge of the North Branch of the Chicago River	
Edgewater	Refers to the edge of Lake Michigan	
Elston Avenue	Alderman, soap manufacturer and banker Daniel Elston.	
Englewood	Englewood, New Jersey	
Euclid Avenue	Euclid, Greek mathematician	
Fabyan Parkway	George Fabyan, millionaire businessman	CR 8 / CR 21
Fairbanks Court	Nathaniel Kellogg Fairbank, Chicago industrialist	
Fillmore Street	Millard Fillmore, thirteenth President of the United States	
Foster Avenue	Doctor John H. Foster (1796-1874), member of the Chicago Board of Education.	
Fuller Park	Melville Fuller, Chief Justice of the Supreme Court	
Fullerton Avenue	Alexander N. Fullerton (1804-1880), lawyer and lumber magnate, who arrived in Chicago in 1833	
Fulton Street	Robert Fulton	
Franklin Street	Benjamin Franklin	
Garfield Boulevard	James A. Garfield, twentieth President of the United States. See below for more information	
Garfield Park	The centerpiece of a three park and interlinking boulevard system, the 185-acre (0.75 km^{2}) park (formerly Central Park) was renamed to honor twentieth President of the United States James A. Garfield after his assassination in 1881. Garfield Boulevard and the Garfield Park Conservatory are also named for him.	
George Street	Settler Sam George sighted the last bear in Chicago at the corner of Adams and LaSalle Streets in 1834. The bear was promptly killed by another settler, John Sweeney.	
Gladys Avenue	Gladys Gunderson, a member of the Norwegian-American family that formed a successful 19th-century Chicago real estate firm, S. T. Gunderson & Sons. Gladys Park is also named for her. Another city street, Langley Avenue, and city park is named for another relative, Esther Gunderson Langley.	
Grace Street	Named after the Lutheran Chicago Theological Seminary(1890-1908) located at Clark/Addison to Grace/Sheffield. It is located at 3800 north and just north of Wrigley Field. The street is named after a core principal of the Lutheran Reformation and not after Mark Grace (Cubs player 1988-2000).	
Grand Avenue	Named for a statement by Thomas J. V. Owen, the first Town President of Chicago, who said "Chicago is a grand place to live."	CR 20
Grant Park	Ulysses S. Grant, eighteenth President of the United States. Originally named Lake Park, it was renamed for Grant in 1901.	
Greenview Avenue	Greenview, Illinois	
Halsted Street	William Ogden named it for William and Caleb Halsted, brothers from New York who developed parts of the Loop	IL 1
Harrison Street	William Henry Harrison, ninth President of the United States	
Hegewisch	Adolph Hegewisch, who laid out the town of Hegewisch which is now part of the 10th Ward of Chicago	
Hirsch Street	Also Hirsch High School; rabbinical scholar Emil Gustav Hirsch	
Honore Street	For Henry Honoré, developer and father of Bertha Palmer	
Howard Street	Howard Uhr, who donated the Howard Street right-of-way to Chicago	
Hoyne Avenue	Named after Thomas Hoyne, who was elected to be mayor of Chicago, but was never allowed to take office	
Hubbard Street	Gurdon Saltonstall Hubbard, who arrived in Chicago in 1818.	
Humboldt Park	The park and a boulevard are named for Alexander von Humboldt, a German naturalist and explorer	
Hyde Park	Named by developer Paul Cornell to evoke the wealth of both Hyde Park, New York and Hyde Park, London.	
Ida B. Wells Drive	Named after civil rights activist Ida B. Wells. Formerly called, Congress Parkway	
Irving Park & Irving Park Road	Washington Irving	
Jackson Boulevard	Andrew Jackson, seventh President of the United States	Historic US 66
Jackson Park	Andrew Jackson, seventh President of the United States	
Jarvis Avenue & Jarvis Square	Named for R. J. Jarvis, a possibly fictitious person purported to be a friend of the Rogers family.	
Jefferson Park & Jefferson Street	Thomas Jefferson, third President of the United States	
Jeffery Boulevard	Edward T. Jeffery, Chief Engineer of the Illinois Central Railroad	
Keating Avenue	William H. Keating	
Kedzie Avenue	John H. Kedzie (1815-1903), an attorney who developed the North and West Sides of Chicago and parts of Evanston. He helped establish the Republican Party in Illinois.	
Kennedy Expressway	John F. Kennedy, thirty-fifth President of the United States	
Kewanee Avenue	A lek for Prairie chickens called "Kewanee" in the Winnebago language was located there	
Kimball Avenue	Walter Kimbell, landowner and subdivider; City Council changed the spelling	
Kimbark Avenue	Seneca Kimbark, member of the first Board of South Park Commissioners	
King Drive	Martin Luther King Jr.; formerly South Park Drive, one the first streets in the nation to be named for King after his assassination, but not the first. The city council unanimously approved the proposal on July 29, 1968, about three months after the first city to rename a street for Dr. King.	
Kinzie Street	John Kinzie, who settled near the river in 1804.	
Kosciuszko Park	Tadeusz Kościuszko, Polish-Lithuanian soldier who fought in the American Revolution.	
Lake Shore Drive	A highway running parallel with and alongside the shoreline of Lake Michigan, which connects many of the city's lakefront parks. The downtown portion opened as Leif Ericson Drive in 1937 and was also called Field Boulevard but in 1946 was renamed Lake Shore Drive.	US 41 / LMCT
Lake Street	Named for Lake Michigan	US 20
LaSalle Street	Sieur de La Salle, an early explorer of Illinois	IL 64
Lincoln Avenue	Abraham Lincoln, sixteenth President of the United States. This is one of the few diagonal streets in Chicago. Prior to Lincoln's assassination the street was known as Little Fort Road as it led to the town of Little Fort, now Waukegan, Illinois	US 41
Lincoln Park	Abraham Lincoln, sixteenth President of the United States. Originally Cemetery Park, then Lake Park, it was renamed for Lincoln following his assassination in 1865.	
Logan Square	Gen. John A. Logan	
Loomis Street	Horatio G. Loomis, one of the organizers of the Chicago Board of Trade in 1848	
Madison Street	James Madison, fourth President of the United States	
Malden Street	Fort Malden, a British fort known as the main entry point for slaves fleeing to freedom in Canada via the Underground Railroad. Now a part of Amherstberg, Ontario, the fort was originally named the town of Maldon. ||	
Maxwell Street	Dr. Philip Maxwell, one of Chicago's first surgeons	
Medill Avenue	Named after Joseph Medill, owner of the Chicago Tribune.	
McClurg Court	A. C. McClurg, Chicago publisher	
McKinley Park	William McKinley, twenty-fifth President of the United States	
Michigan Avenue	Named for Lake Michigan	
Midway Airport	Battle of Midway	
Midway Plaisance	The central path (Middle Way) connecting Washington Park to Jackson Park, built for the World's Columbian Exposition. Plaisance is from the French for Pleasant. The name midway has been adopted for the portions of amusement parks where rides and games are set up.	
Mies van der Rohe Way	Named after German-American architect Ludwig Mies van der Rohe.	
Milwaukee Avenue	Algonquin word for "the Land."	US 45 / IL 21
Monroe Street	James Monroe, fifth President of the United States	
Normal Avenue	For the Chicago Normal School (now Chicago State University)	
North Avenue	Was the northern boundary of the city when the street was named.	IL 64
Oak Street	Named for the oak tree.	
Ogden Avenue	William Butler Ogden, first mayor of Chicago	US 30 / US 34
O'Hare Airport	Edward "Butch" O'Hare, World War II flying ace and Medal of Honor recipient	
Ohio Street	Named for the state of Ohio, which means "beautiful river."	
Peoria Street	Peoria, Illinois, the oldest European settlement in Illinois.	
Pershing Road	General John J. Pershing (formerly 39th Street)	
Pilsen	Plzeň, a city in the Czech Republic	
Ping Tom Memorial Park	Ping Tom, Chicago Chinatown businessman and civic leader.	
Polk Street	James K. Polk, eleventh President of the United States	
Prairie Avenue	Named for the Illinois prairies.	
Pulaski Road	Casimir Pulaski, Polish military commander during the Revolutionary War; formerly Crawford Avenue, named after Peter Crawford, an early area landowner.	
Pullman	George Pullman, engineer, industrialist, and the founder of the Pullman Company	
Quincy Street	John Quincy Adams, sixth President of the United States	
Randolph Street	named for Randolph County, Illinois as was part of the original plot of Chicago.	
Ridge Boulevard/Avenue	Runs along a ridge formed by Lake Michigan	US 14
Rogers Park	Pioneer settler Philip Rogers	
Roosevelt Road	Theodore Roosevelt, twenty-sixth President of the United States (formerly 12th Street)	IL 38
Rush Street	Named for Dr. Benjamin Rush, a signer of the Declaration of Independence, Rush Street dates back to the 1830s incorporation of Chicago.	
St. Louis Avenue	The street and St. Louis Park are named after Louis IX of France	
St. Clair Street	Named after Revolutionary War General Arthur St. Clair and Governor of the Northwest Territory	
Sauganash, and Caldwell Avenues	Billy Caldwell, also known as Sauganash	US 14
Sedgwick Street	John Sedgwick, Civil War general	
Seminary Avenue	Possibly named after the Chicago Lutheran Theological Seminary located at Clark/Addison to Grace/Sheffield (1890-1908).	
Sheffield Avenue	Subdivider Joseph Sheffield	
Sheridan Road	Philip Henry Sheridan, Civil War general	IL 137 / LMCT
Sibley Boulevard	Known as 147th Street (Sibley Street in Hammond, Indiana only)	IL 83
Southport Avenue	Led to Kenosha, Wisconsin, which was formerly named Southport	
State Street	Originally State Road, its intersection with Madison Street marks the base point for Chicago's address system. North of the Chicago River, this was formerly called Wolcott.	
Stevenson Expressway	Adlai Stevenson II, thirty-first Governor of Illinois	
Streeterville	George "Cap" Streeter	
Stony Island Avenue	Leads to Stony Island, a ridge of land that appeared to be an island to pioneers	
Taylor Street	Zachary Taylor, twelfth President of the United States	
Throop Street	Amos G. Throop, a Chicago lumberman	
Torrence Avenue	Named for Civil War General Joseph T. Torrence. He led the Chicago militia during the Great Railroad Strike of 1877.	US 6 / IL 83
Touhy Avenue	Named for local subdivider Patrick L. Touhy who was the son in law of Philip Rogers.	IL 72
Van Buren Street	Martin Van Buren, eighth President of the United States	
Vincennes Avenue	Fort Vincennes, Indiana	
Wabash Avenue	Wabash Railroad	
Wacker Drive	Charles H. Wacker, chairman of the Chicago Plan Commission, who pushed the idea of a double decked roadway along the Chicago River.	
Waller Avenue	Robert A. Waller, founder of Buena Park	
Warren Boulevard	General Joseph Warren, American Revolutionary war patriot and doctor.	
Washington Park	George Washington, first President of the United States, formerly known as Western Division of South Park, also Park No. 21	
Washington Street	George Washington, first President of the United States	
Wentworth Avenue	Long John Wentworth, mayor	
Wells Street	William Wells, soldier	
Western Avenue	Was the western boundary of the city when the street was named.	CR 53
Whipple Street	Henry Benjamin Whipple (1822-1901), Episcopal bishop	
Wicker Park	Named for Charles G. Wicker and Joel H. Wicker.	
Wilson Ave	John P. Wilson, lawyer and donator to Children's Memorial Hospital	
Wolcott Avenue	Dr. Alexander Wolcott Jr. (1790-1830), first physician in Chicago, trader, served as Chicago's US Indian Agent from the late 1810s through the late 1820s. Until 1939, the road was Lincoln Street.	
Wrightwood Avenue	Edward Wright, a subdivider and an attorney	
Wrigleyville	Named for Wrigley Field, in turn named for William Wrigley Jr.	
