= Monroe Township, Indiana =

Monroe Township is the name of sixteen townships in Indiana:

- Monroe Township, Adams County, Indiana
- Monroe Township, Allen County, Indiana
- Monroe Township, Carroll County, Indiana
- Monroe Township, Clark County, Indiana
- Monroe Township, Delaware County, Indiana
- Monroe Township, Grant County, Indiana
- Monroe Township, Howard County, Indiana
- Monroe Township, Jefferson County, Indiana
- Monroe Township, Kosciusko County, Indiana
- Monroe Township, Madison County, Indiana
- Monroe Township, Morgan County, Indiana
- Monroe Township, Pike County, Indiana
- Monroe Township, Pulaski County, Indiana
- Monroe Township, Putnam County, Indiana
- Monroe Township, Randolph County, Indiana
- Monroe Township, Washington County, Indiana

== See also ==
- Monroe Township (disambiguation)
