= Desmopachria barackobamai =

Desmopachria

Scientific classification
- Kingdom: Animalia
- Phylum: Arthropoda
- Clade: Pancrustacea
- Class: Insecta
- Order: Coleoptera
- Suborder: Adephaga
- Family: Dytiscidae
- Genus: Desmopachria
- Species: D. barackobamai

Binomial name
- Desmopachria barackobamai Makhan, 2015

Species of beetle

Desmopachria barackobamai is a species of diving beetles, in the genus Desmopachria.

It was first described in 2015, by Dewanand Makhan, having been found in French Guiana. He named it after the 44th President of the United States, Barack Obama.

== See also ==
- List of things named after Barack Obama
- List of organisms named after famous people (born 1950–1974)
