= List of awards and honors received by George H. W. Bush =

This is a list of awards, honors, and memorials to George H. W. Bush, the 41st president of the United States.

== Presidential library ==
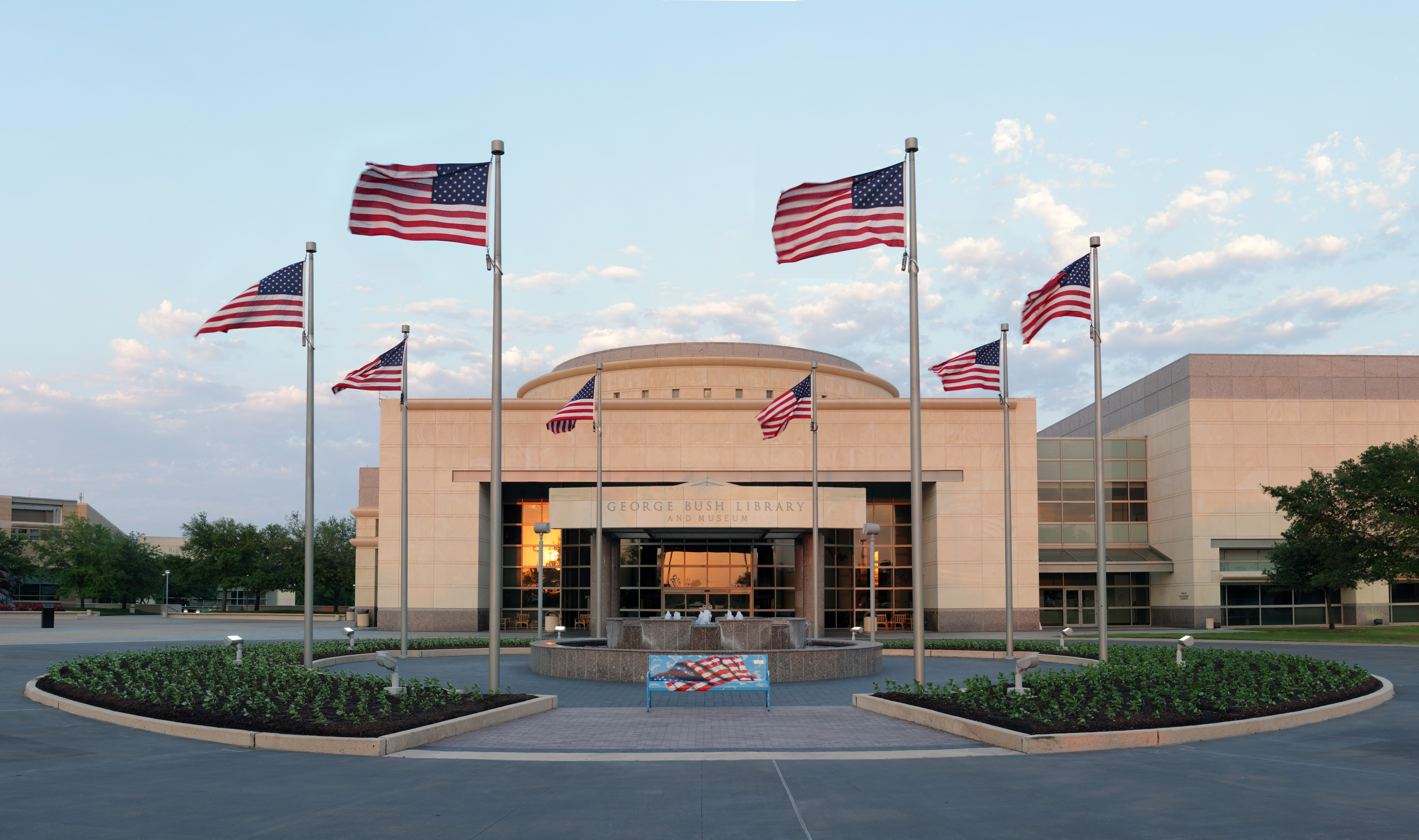
The George H.W. Bush Presidential Library and Museum on the west campus of Texas A&M University in College Station, Texas

The George H.W. Bush Presidential Library is the nation's tenth presidential library which was built between 1995 and 1997. It contains the presidential and vice presidential papers of Bush and the vice presidential papers of Dan Quayle. It was dedicated on November 6, 1997, and opened to the public shortly thereafter; the architectural firm of Hellmuth, Obata and Kassabaum designed the complex.

The George H.W. Bush Presidential Library is located on a 90-acre (36 ha) site on the west campus of Texas A&M University in College Station, Texas, on a plaza adjoining the Presidential Conference Center and the Texas A&M Academic Center. The Library operates under NARA's administration and the provisions of the Presidential Libraries Act of 1955.

The Bush School of Government and Public Service is a graduate public policy school at Texas A&M University in College Station, Texas, which was established in 1995. The graduate school is part of the presidential library complex, and offers four programs — two master's degree programs (Public Service and Administration, and International Affairs) and three certificate programs (Advanced International Affairs, Nonprofit Management, and Homeland Security).

== Other memorials ==
Bush is commemorated on a postage stamp issued by the United States Postal Service on June 12, 2019 at a first day ceremony held at the George H.W. Bush Presidential Library. While stamps honoring deceased individuals are customarily issued only after three years have passed since the death of the person, guidance by the U.S. Citizens’ Stamp Advisory Committee advises that stamps honoring deceased presidents should be issued as soon as possible. The stamp design is centered on a portrait of Bush by Michael J. Deas and is non-denominated.

In 1999, the CIA headquarters in Langley, Virginia, was named George Bush Center for Intelligence in his honor.

The George Bush Intercontinental Airport in Houston, Texas, is named for Bush.

Two elementary schools are named after him:

- George Herbert Walker Bush Elementary School in Addison, Texas, operated by the Dallas Independent School District
- George H. W. Bush Elementary School in Midland, Texas, operated by the Midland Independent School District, opened in 1989.

== Scholastic ==
University degrees

Location	Date	School	Degree
Connecticut	1948	Yale University	Bachelor of Arts (BA) in Economics

Chancellor, visitor, governor, rector and fellowships

Location	Date	School	Position
Connecticut	2000 – 2001	Timothy Dwight College at Yale University	Chubb Fellow

=== Honorary degrees ===
George H. W. Bush received honorary degrees from several American and international universities, including:

Year	School and location	Degree
1981	Howard University, Washington, D.C.	Doctor of Laws (LL.D)
1981	Sacred Heart University, Fairfield, Connecticut	Doctor of Laws (LL.D)
1982	Miami University, Oxford, Ohio	Doctor of Laws (LL.D)
1982	Boston College, Boston, Massachusetts	Doctor of Laws (LL.D)
1983	Ohio State University, Columbus, Ohio	Doctor of Humane Letters (L.H.D.)
1983	Medical University of South Carolina, Charleston, South Carolina	Doctor of Humane Letters (L.H.D.)
1989	Texas A&M University, College Station, Texas	Doctorate
1990	Oklahoma State University, Stillwater, Oklahoma	Doctor of Economics
1990	Liberty University, Lynchburg, Virginia	Doctor of Humanities (HH.D.)
1990	University of Texas at Austin, Austin, Texas	Doctor of Laws (LL.D)
1991	Princeton University, Princeton, New Jersey	Doctor of Laws (LL.D)
1992	University of Notre Dame, Notre Dame, Indiana	Doctor of Laws (LL.D)
1995	College of William & Mary, Williamsburg, Virginia	Doctor of Laws (LL.D)
1998	University of Miami, Miami, Florida	Doctor of Public Service
1998	Lafayette College, Easton, Pennsylvania	Doctor of Laws (LL.D)
1998	Nanjing University, Nanjing, China	Doctorate
1999	Central Connecticut State University, New Britain, Connecticut	Doctor of Laws (LL.D)
1999	Washington College, Chestertown, Maryland	Doctor of Public Service (D.P.S.)
1999	Charles University, Prague, Czech Republic	Doctor of Philosophy
2000	Saint Anselm College, Goffstown, New Hampshire	Doctor of Laws (LL.D)
2008	Bryant University, Smithfield, Rhode Island	Doctor of Humane Letters
2009	University of Macau, Macau, China	Doctor of Social Sciences
2011	Dartmouth College, Hanover, New Hampshire	Doctor of Laws (LL.D)
2014	Harvard University, Cambridge, Massachusetts	Doctor of Laws (LL.D)
2016	National Intelligence University, Bethesda, Maryland	Doctor of Strategic Intelligence

== Awards and honors ==
In 1990, Time magazine named him the Man of the Year. In 1991, the U.S. Navy Memorial Foundation awarded Bush its Lone Sailor award for his naval service and his subsequent government service. In 1993, he was made an Honorary Knight Grand Cross of the Order of the Bath by Queen Elizabeth II. In 1995, Poland's President Lech Wałęsa awarded Bush the Grand Cross of the Order of Merit of the Republic of Poland for his support in helping Poland become a democratic state. In December 2001, Hungary's President Ferenc Mádl awarded Bush the Grand Cross with Chain of the Order of Merit of the Republic of Hungary. In 2009, he received the PGA Tour Lifetime Achievement Award and was inducted into the World Golf Hall of Fame two years later. In 2011, Bush was awarded the Presidential Medal of Freedom—the highest civilian honor in the United States—by President Barack Obama. The USS George H.W. Bush (CVN-77), the tenth and last Nimitz-class supercarrier of the United States Navy, was named for Bush.

In 2004, the John F. Kennedy Library Foundation presented the Profile in Courage Award to Bush and Mount Vernon awarded him its first Cyrus A. Ansary Prize. The Ansary prize was presented in Houston with Ansary, Barbara Lucas, Ryan C. Crocker, dean of the Bush school since January 2010, Barbara Bush, and Curt Viebranz in attendance with the former president. Bush directed $50,000 of the prize to the Bush School of Government and Public Service at Texas A&M University, and $25,000 to fund an animation about the Siege of Yorktown for Mount Vernon. Viebranz and Lucas represented Mount Vernon at the presentation.

=== Awards ===
Location	Date	Institution	Award
Indiana	1983	Governor of Indiana	Sagamore of the Wabash
Indiana	1986	National Collegiate Athletic Association	Theodore Roosevelt Award
New York	1990	Ellis Island Honors Society	Ellis Island Medal of Honor
New York	2005	International Rescue Committee	Freedom Award
Pennsylvania	2006	National Constitution Center	Philadelphia Liberty Medal
California	2007	Ronald Reagan Presidential Library	Ronald Reagan Freedom Award
Massachusetts	2014	John F. Kennedy Presidential Library and Museum	Profile in Courage Award
Brussels	2014	European Parliament	Robert Schuman Medal

=== National honors ===
Country	Date	Decoration	Post-nominal letters
United States	15 February 1945	Distinguished Flying Cross	
United States	1945	Presidential Unit Citation	
United States	1945	Asiatic–Pacific Campaign Medal with five battle stars	
United States	1945	American Campaign Medal	
United States	1945	World War II Victory Medal	
United States	21 April 1954	Air Medal	
United States	5 February 2011	Presidential Medal of Freedom	

=== Foreign honors ===
Country	Date	Decoration	Post-nominal letters
Kuwait	15 April 1993	Collar of the Order of Mubarak the Great	
United Kingdom	30 November 1993	Honorary Knight Grand Cross of the Order of the Bath	GCB
Germany	30 January 1994	Order of Merit of the Federal Republic of Germany (Grand Cross Special Class)	
Poland	21 July 1995	Order of Merit of the Republic of Poland (1st Class)	
Czech Republic	17 November 1999	Order of the White Lion (1st Class)	
Hungary	28 November 2001	Grand Cross with Chain of the Order of Merit of the Republic of Hungary	
Kazakhstan	19 December 2001	Order of Friendship (1st Class)	
Sovereign Military Order of Malta	2001	Order pro Merito Melitensi	
(United Nations) Kosovo	12 June 2004	Order of Freedom	
Russia	9 May 2005	Jubilee Medal "60 Years of Victory in the Great Patriotic War 1941–1945"	
Estonia	15 September 2005	Order of the Cross of Terra Mariana (1st Class)	

== See also ==
- Presidential memorials in the United States
