= Desmopachria =

Scientific classification
- Kingdom: Animalia
- Phylum: Arthropoda
- Class: Insecta
- Order: Coleoptera
- Suborder: Adephaga
- Family: Dytiscidae
- Tribe: Hyphydrini
- Genus: Desmopachria; Babington, 1841

Genus of beetles

Desmopachria is a genus of beetles in the family Dytiscidae, containing the following species:

- Desmopachria aldessa Young, 1980
- Desmopachria amyae K.B.Miller, 2001
- Desmopachria annae K.B.Miller, 2005
- Desmopachria aphronoscelus K.B.Miller, 1999
- Desmopachria aspera Young, 1981
- Desmopachria attenuata Régimbart, 1895
- Desmopachria aurea Young, 1980
- Desmopachria balfourbrownei Young, 1990
- Desmopachria balionota K.B.Miller, 2005
- Desmopachria barackobamai 2015
- Desmopachria basicollis Guignot, 1950
- Desmopachria bifasciata Zimmermann, 1921
- Desmopachria bolivari K.B.Miller, 1999
- Desmopachria brevicollis Régimbart, 1903
- Desmopachria bryanstonii (Clark, 1862)
- Desmopachria cenchramis Young, 1981
- Desmopachria challeti K.B.Miller, 2001
- Desmopachria chei K.B.Miller, 1999
- Desmopachria circularis Sharp, 1882
- Desmopachria concolor Sharp, 1882
- Desmopachria convexa (Aubé, 1838)
- Desmopachria darlingtoni Young, 1989
- Desmopachria decorosa Young, 1995
- Desmopachria defloccata Young, 1981
- Desmopachria dispar Sharp, 1882
- Desmopachria dispersa (Crotch, 1873)
- Desmopachria draco K.B.Miller, 1999
- Desmopachria ferrugata Régimbart, 1895
- Desmopachria flavida Young, 1981
- Desmopachria fossulata Zimmermann, 1928
- Desmopachria geijskesi Young, 1990
- Desmopachria glabella Young, 1981
- Desmopachria glabricula Sharp, 1882
- Desmopachria goias Young, 1995
- Desmopachria granoides Young, 1986
- Desmopachria granum (LeConte, 1855)
- Desmopachria grouvellei Régimbart, 1895
- Desmopachria hylobates Young, 1993
- Desmopachria iridis Young, 1980
- Desmopachria isthmia Young, 1981
- Desmopachria laesslei Young, 1981
- Desmopachria laevis Sharp, 1882
- Desmopachria latissima (LeConte, 1852)
- Desmopachria leechi Young, 1981
- Desmopachria lewisi Young, 1981
- Desmopachria liosomata Young, 1986
- Desmopachria majuscula Young, 1990
- Desmopachria margarita Young, 1990
- Desmopachria mendozana (Steinheil, 1869)
- Desmopachria mexicana Sharp, 1882
- Desmopachria minuta Young, 1980
- Desmopachria mutata Sharp, 1882
- Desmopachria mutchleri Blatchley, 1919
- Desmopachria nigra Zimmermann, 1923
- Desmopachria nitida Babington, 1841
- Desmopachria nitidissima Zimmermann, 1928
- Desmopachria nitidoides Young, 1990
- Desmopachria novacula Young, 1980
- Desmopachria ovalis Sharp, 1882
- Desmopachria paradoxa Zimmermann, 1923
- Desmopachria phacoides Guignot, 1950
- Desmopachria pilosa K.B.Miller, 2005
- Desmopachria pittieri Young, 1995
- Desmopachria portmanni (Clark, 1862)
- Desmopachria psarammo K.B.Miller, 1999
- Desmopachria pulvis Guignot, 1958
- Desmopachria punctatissima Zimmermann, 1923
- Desmopachria rhea K.B.Miller, 1999
- Desmopachria ruginosa Young, 1990
- Desmopachria sanfilippoi Guignot, 1957
- Desmopachria seminola Young, 1951
- Desmopachria signata Zimmermann, 1921
- Desmopachria signatoides K.B.Miller, 2001
- Desmopachria siolii Young, 1980
- Desmopachria sobrina Young, 1995
- Desmopachria speculum Sharp, 1887
- Desmopachria striga Young, 1990
- Desmopachria strigata Young, 1981
- Desmopachria striola Sharp, 1887
- Desmopachria subfasciata Young, 1990
- Desmopachria subnotata Zimmermann, 1921
- Desmopachria subtilis Sharp, 1882
- Desmopachria suturalis Sharp, 1882
- Desmopachria tambopatensis K.B.Miller, 2005
- Desmopachria taniae K.B.Miller, 1999
- Desmopachria tarda Spangler, 1973
- Desmopachria ubangoides Young, 1980
- Desmopachria varians Wehncke, 1877
- Desmopachria variegata Sharp, 1882
- Desmopachria vicina Sharp, 1887
- Desmopachria volatidisca K.B.Miller, 2001
- Desmopachria volvata Young, 1981
- Desmopachria youngi K.B.Miller, 1999
- Desmopachria zelota Young, 1990
- Desmopachria zethus Young, 1995
- Desmopachria zimmermani Young, 1981
