= Desmopachria mexicana =

Scientific classification
- Kingdom: Animalia
- Phylum: Arthropoda
- Class: Insecta
- Order: Coleoptera
- Suborder: Adephaga
- Family: Dytiscidae
- Genus: Desmopachria
- Species: D. mexicana

Binomial name
- Desmopachria mexicana Sharp, 1882

Species of beetle

Desmopachria mexicana is a species of predaceous diving beetle in the family Dytiscidae. It is found in North America and the Neotropics.
