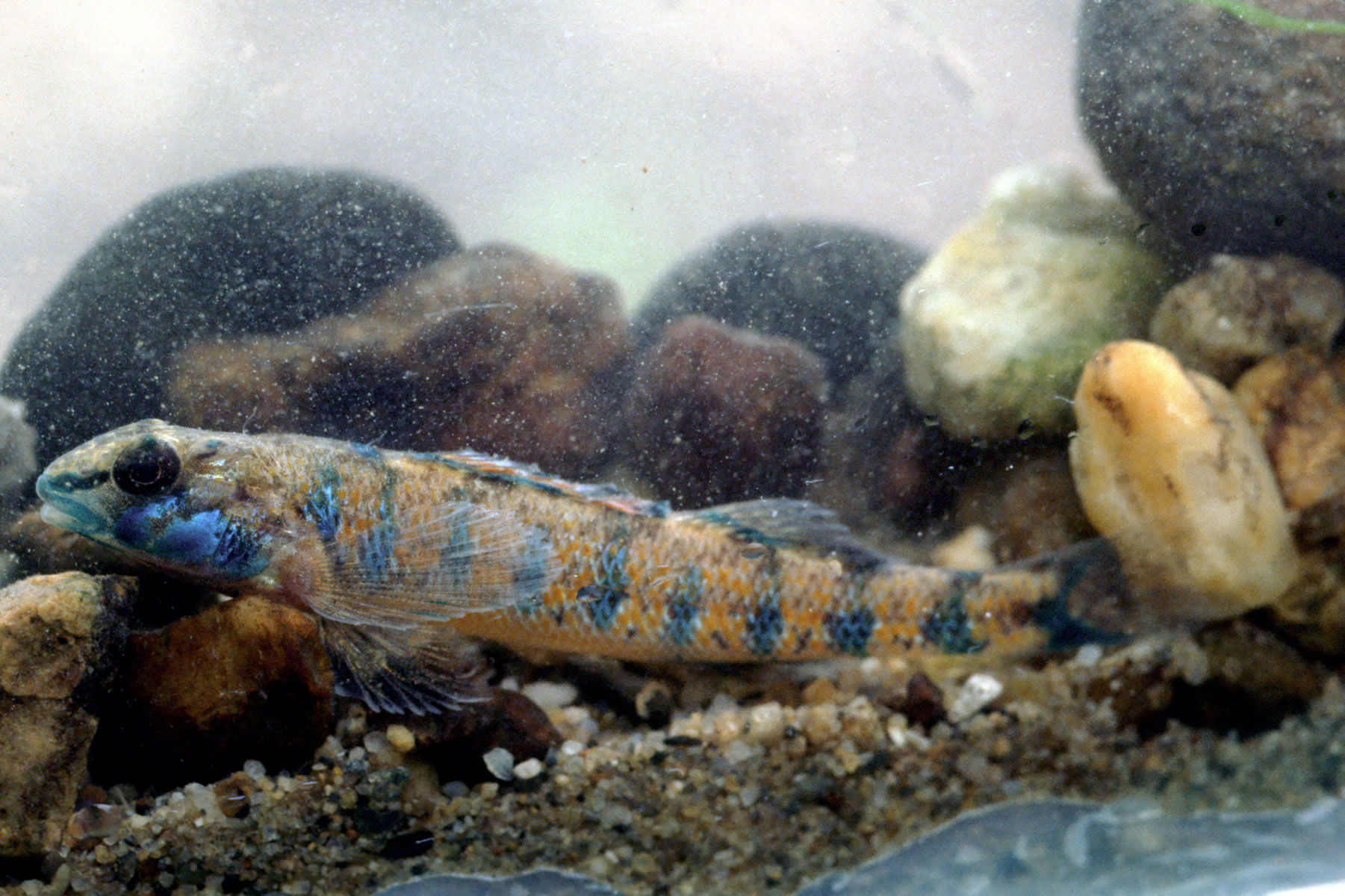

Conservation status
- Least Concern (IUCN 3.1)

Scientific classification
- Kingdom: Animalia
- Phylum: Chordata
- Class: Actinopterygii
- Order: Perciformes
- Family: Percidae
- Genus: Etheostoma
- Species: E. stigmaeum

Binomial name
- Etheostoma stigmaeum (D. S. Jordan, 1877)

Synonyms
- Boleosoma stigmaeum D. S. Jordan, 1877

= Speckled darter =

Species of fish

The speckled darter (Etheostoma stigmaeum) is a species of freshwater ray-finned fish, a darter from the subfamily Etheostomatinae, part of the family Percidae, which also contains the perches, ruffes and pikeperches. It is endemic to the central and southeastern United States. It occurs in the Mississippi River basin and through the Gulf Coast drainages. It is also found in the Clinch River and the Powell River. This species inhabits rocky or sandy pools in flowing waters up to the size of medium rivers with fast currents. It can reach a length of 6.1 centimetres (2.4 in) TL though most only reach about 4 centimetres (1.6 in).

In 2012, studies found five distinct species that were formerly included in E. stigmaeum. In a paper published in the Bulletin of the Alabama Museum of Natural History, Mayden and Layman described five new species, all named after former U S presidents and one vice president, based on their "leadership in conservation policies":

- Etheostoma teddyroosevelt (highland darter)
- Etheostoma jimmycarter (bluegrass darter)
- Etheostoma clinton (beaded darter)
- Etheostoma gore (Cumberland darter)
- Etheostoma obama (spangled darter)

== Description ==
Speckled darters, Etheostoma stigmaeum, are a member of the family Percidae. They have a moderately blunt snout, with no premaxillary frenum. They can reach a maximum length of about 2.2 inches. They have both spines and rays, their lateral line is incomplete, and their gill covers are slightly connected by a membrane across their throat. The midline of their belly does not have enlarged scales. They have a sandy colored dorsal side and a yellow or white ventral side. There are 6 dark brown saddles and large specks on the dorsum, with 7–11 dark brown blotches down their body. Mating males have turquoise colored bands on their sides and in their fins, as opposed to the typical dark blue. Breeding females are much less brightly colored than the males. They develop extended genital papilla.

== Habitat ==
Speckled darters are freshwater fish. They prefer clear pools of up to 1 m deep, with moderately swift streams. They typically prefer a bottom of sand or sand and gravel.

== Reproduction and Life Cycle ==
Spawning in Missouri begins as early as March and ends as late as May, at temperatures between 57°F and 62°F. The eggs are buried in substrate, where there is a relationship between temperature and incubation period, with higher temperatures lessening the time. Typical incubation period is about 9–10 days at about 62–68°F. Larvae hatch at about 4.2-5.2 mm with a functional jaw and well developed pectoral fins.

== Distribution ==
The speckled darter is found in eastern Oklahoma, southeastern Kansas, western Louisiana, Virginia, northwestern Georgia, western Florida, and in the Gulf drainages from the Sabine River to the Pensacola Bay.

== Etymology ==
The scientific name for the speckled darter is Etheostoma stigmaeum. Etheostoma is derived from the etheo, the Greek word for "to strain", and stoma, the Greek word for "mouth". Stigmaeum is the Greek word for "speckled".
