= Desmopachria convexa =

Scientific classification
- Domain: Eukaryota
- Kingdom: Animalia
- Phylum: Arthropoda
- Class: Insecta
- Order: Coleoptera
- Suborder: Adephaga
- Family: Dytiscidae
- Genus: Desmopachria
- Species: D. convexa

Binomial name
- Desmopachria convexa (Aubé, 1838)

Species of beetle

Desmopachria convexa is a species of predaceous diving beetle in the family Dytiscidae. It is found in North America and South America.
