= Desmopachria dispersa =

Scientific classification
- Domain: Eukaryota
- Kingdom: Animalia
- Phylum: Arthropoda
- Class: Insecta
- Order: Coleoptera
- Suborder: Adephaga
- Family: Dytiscidae
- Genus: Desmopachria
- Species: D. dispersa

Binomial name
- Desmopachria dispersa (Crotch, 1873)

Species of beetle

Desmopachria dispersa is a species of predaceous diving beetle in the family Dytiscidae. It is found in North America and the Neotropics.
