= President Andrew Johnson Museum and Library =

Presidential library

Coordinates: 36°10′25″N 82°45′45″W

The President Andrew Johnson Museum and Library is the presidential library and museum for Andrew Johnson, located on the Greeneville campus of Tusculum University in Tennessee.

== History ==
In 1840, the number of students at the college was 70. The time had come to expand the campus and construct a new building to replace the second Academy Building. Several citizens, including Johnson himself, donated a total of $4,245.62 for construction of a building that housed classrooms, a chapel, offices, and a library. The structure was ready for students in October 1841 and was used until 1887. With the addition of other buildings, Old College served a variety of other purposes such as faculty housing, classroom space and a student dormitory. In 1993, the structure, known as Old College, was restored to its original appearance and renovated to house the Andrew Johnson Collection, along with other related programs.

== Today ==
The building is open from Monday to Friday from 9 am to 5 pm or by appointment.

== See also ==
- Presidential memorials in the United States
