= List of memorials to John Tyler =

This is a list of memorials to John Tyler, the tenth president of the United States.

Some places and institutions previously named for Tyler have been renamed due to Tyler's having been a slaveholder and a legislator for the Confederate States of America during the American Civil War. The new names are indicated in the lists below.

== Places ==
- Tyler, Texas
- Tyler County, Texas
- John Tyler Island inside Lake Harner in the Bicentennial Nature Area in Lafayette, Indiana

== Sculptures ==
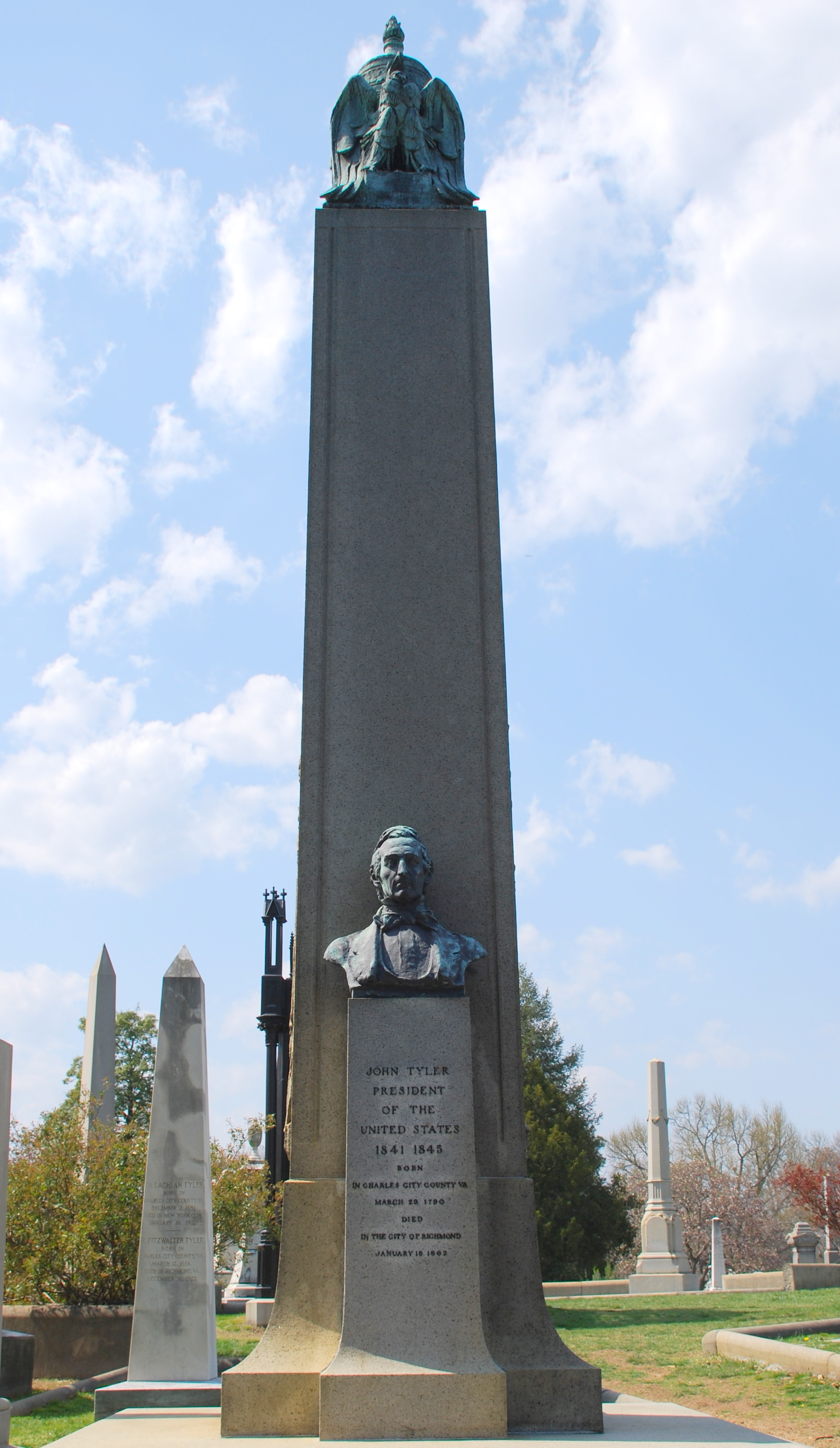
John Tyler's grave at Hollywood Cemetery

- John Tyler Memorial (1915), by Raymond Averill Porter, Hollywood Cemetery, Richmond, Virginia

== Schools ==
- John Tyler Community College, Chester, Virginia—renamed Brightpoint Community College
- John Tyler High School, Tyler, Texas—renamed Tyler High School
- John Tyler Elementary School, Hampton, Virginia—renamed Mary S. Peake Elementary School
- John Tyler Elementary School, Portsmouth, Virginia—renamed Waterview Elementary School
- John Tyler Elementary School, Washington, DC—renamed Shirley Chisolm Elementary School

== Buildings ==
- Tyler Hall (named for both John Tyler and his son Lyon Gardiner Tyler) at the College of William & Mary, Williamsburg, Virginia—renamed Chancellors' Hall

== Streets ==
- Tyler Street, Chicago, Illinois—renamed Congress Street in 1872
- John Tyler Drive, Chester, Virginia—planned to be renamed Brightpoint Drive

== See also ==
- Presidential memorials in the United States
