= Jackson Township, Indiana =

Jackson Township is the name of forty-seven townships in the U.S. state of Indiana:

- Jackson Township, Allen County, Indiana
- Jackson Township, Bartholomew County, Indiana
- Jackson Township, Blackford County, Indiana
- Jackson Township, Boone County, Indiana
- Jackson Township, Brown County, Indiana
- Jackson Township, Carroll County, Indiana
- Jackson Township, Cass County, Indiana
- Jackson Township, Clay County, Indiana
- Jackson Township, Clinton County, Indiana
- Jackson Township, Dearborn County, Indiana
- Jackson Township, Decatur County, Indiana
- Jackson Township, DeKalb County, Indiana
- Jackson Township, Dubois County, Indiana
- Jackson Township, Elkhart County, Indiana
- Jackson Township, Fayette County, Indiana
- Jackson Township, Fountain County, Indiana
- Jackson Township, Greene County, Indiana
- Jackson Township, Hamilton County, Indiana
- Jackson Township, Hancock County, Indiana
- Jackson Township, Harrison County, Indiana
- Jackson Township, Howard County, Indiana
- Jackson Township, Huntington County, Indiana
- Jackson Township, Jackson County, Indiana
- Jackson Township, Jay County, Indiana
- Jackson Township, Kosciusko County, Indiana
- Jackson Township, Madison County, Indiana
- Jackson Township, Miami County, Indiana
- Jackson Township, Morgan County, Indiana
- Jackson Township, Newton County, Indiana
- Jackson Township, Orange County, Indiana
- Jackson Township, Owen County, Indiana
- Jackson Township, Parke County, Indiana
- Jackson Township, Porter County, Indiana
- Jackson Township, Putnam County, Indiana
- Jackson Township, Randolph County, Indiana
- Jackson Township, Ripley County, Indiana
- Jackson Township, Rush County, Indiana
- Jackson Township, Shelby County, Indiana
- Jackson Township, Spencer County, Indiana
- Jackson Township, Starke County, Indiana
- Jackson Township, Steuben County, Indiana
- Jackson Township, Sullivan County, Indiana
- Jackson Township, Tippecanoe County, Indiana
- Jackson Township, Washington County, Indiana
- Jackson Township, Wayne County, Indiana
- Jackson Township, Wells County, Indiana
- Jackson Township, White County, Indiana

== See also ==
- Jackson Township (disambiguation)
