= Barack Obama (horse) =

Anglo-Arabian racehorse (1998–2018)

- Jenny Champion riding Barack Obama
- Species: Horse
- Breed: Anglo-Arabian
- Sex: Gelding
- Born: 1998; New Zealand
- Died: 14 September 2018 (aged 20); Tryon, North Carolina, US
- Cause of death: Animal euthanasia
- Occupation: Racehorse
- Years active: 2009–2018
- Owner: Mark Round

Barack Obama (1998 – 14 September 2018) was an Anglo-Arabian horse from New Zealand that competed in international endurance events beginning in 2009, the same year that Barack Obama became president of the United States.

== Racing career ==
In 2014, Jenny Champion began to ride the horse, and the team had fifteen starts and six wins. In 2018, Champion began to fundraise to be able to participate in the 2018 FEI World Equestrian Games, with a goal of NZD$80,000. She trained with Barack Obama constantly, making sure that he was well-groomed after each ride.

Together they represented New Zealand at the games in Tryon, North Carolina. The 120-kilometre race that Barack Obama participated in was abandoned due to poor weather conditions, and he was taken into the Tryon International Equestrian Center to be treated for kidney issues. Shortly thereafter, Mark Round, Barack Obama's owner, elected to euthanize the horse. Following the death of Barack Obama, samples were taken from his carcass.

== Death ==
According to Sarah Dalziell-Clout, the Equestrian Sport NZ High Performance Director, Barack Obama's death was unexpected. She said that the horse was in good health prior to the race, and that the team veterinarian, Nick Page, was confident in Barack Obama's readiness. FEI President Ingmar De Vos, as well as the FEI Veterinary Director and President of the Endurance Veterinary Commission, held a press conference stating that the race was abandoned over concerns for the health of the horses, with high heat and humidity causing a large number of the horses present to show signs of distress. Of the 95 starters in the race, 50 saw veterinary treatment, including Barack Obama. A veterinary report revealed that the horses treated were severely dehydrated from excessive sweating, and required fluid therapy.

== See also ==
- List of racehorses
- List of things named after Barack Obama
