= Loomis Street =

Street in Chicago

- Loomis Boulevard; Noble Street; Southport Avenue; Glenwood Avenue; 1400 West
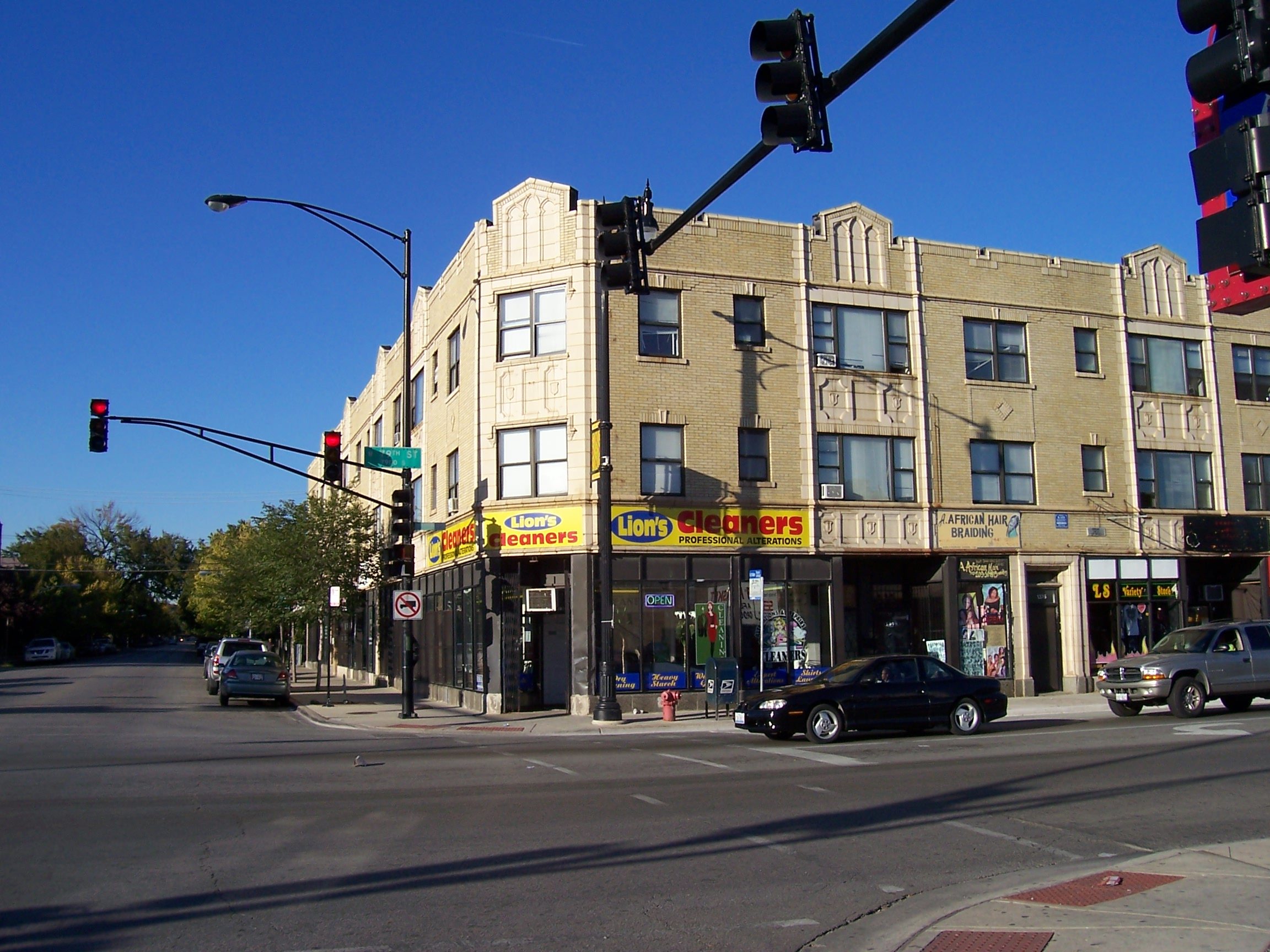
- Loomis Boulevard at 79th Street
- South end: Center Avenue (~19000 S) in Homewood as "Loomis Street"
- North end: Touhy Avenue (7200 N) as "Glenwood Avenue"

Loomis Street is a north–south street in Chicago that is 1400 W in Chicago's grid system, making it 1.75 miles (2.82 km) west of the north–south baseline of State Street. It runs from the Chicago and Northwestern Railway tracks south, with interruptions, to Center Avenue in the suburb of Homewood. Between the railway tracks and the north branch of the Chicago River it is known as Noble Street and north of the River's north branch it is known as Southport Avenue. As Southport Avenue it goes up north to its intersection with Clark Street just south of Berteau. The street continues again at Argyle Street until Touhy Avenue as Glenwood Avenue.

Loomis Street is named for Horatio G. Loomis, one of the founders of the Chicago Board of Trade. Noble Street is named after civic leaders John and Mark Noble, who were employees of constable Archibald Clybourn.

== Transit ==
=== Glenwood Avenue ===
- The Morse station is located along Glenwood Avenue on the CTA Red Line.

=== Southport Avenue ===
- Southport Avenue has a stop on the CTA Brown Line.

=== Noble Street ===
A horse car line opened on Noble Street between Milwaukee and Blackhawk Avenues on June 11, 1885; this was part of a route from Milwaukee to Wood Street and Cortland Avenue. Streetcars replaced horse cars in 1896, and the route was cut back to its southern half, to North and Ashland Avenues. As of 1928, this route did not have owl service, the last northbound car leaving at 8:40 p.m. One-man streetcars began service on November 1, 1921, and the line was restricted to rush hours only on July 25, 1931. Service ended on March 5, 1932, but service cars going to the Elston carbarn continued using it until February 8, 1944.

=== Loomis Street ===
- Racine station on the CTA Blue Line has an additional entrance at Loomis Street. Loomis Street is also the namesake of the Loomis Ramp, a railway viaduct that rises from the Congress Branch and merges with the Paulina Connector to the Douglas Branch. From 1958 to 2008, some Blue Line trains branched off the Congress Branch at the Loomis Ramp to continue to 54th/Cermak. Today, the Pink Line serves the Douglas Branch, making the Loomis Ramp used only for non-revenue service.
- What is now CTA's Green Line formerly had two stations on Loomis Street; one on the Lake Street Elevated, and the other on the Englewood Branch. The Lake Street Elevated station operated from 1893 to 1948, while the one on the Englewood Branch operated from 1907 until it was replaced by the Ashland/63rd station in 1969.
- Brainerd station on the Beverly branch of Metra's Rock Island District line directly connects to Loomis Street.

== Works cited ==
- Lind, Alan R. (1974). Chicago Surface Lines: An Illustrated History. Park Forest, Illinois: Transport History Press.
