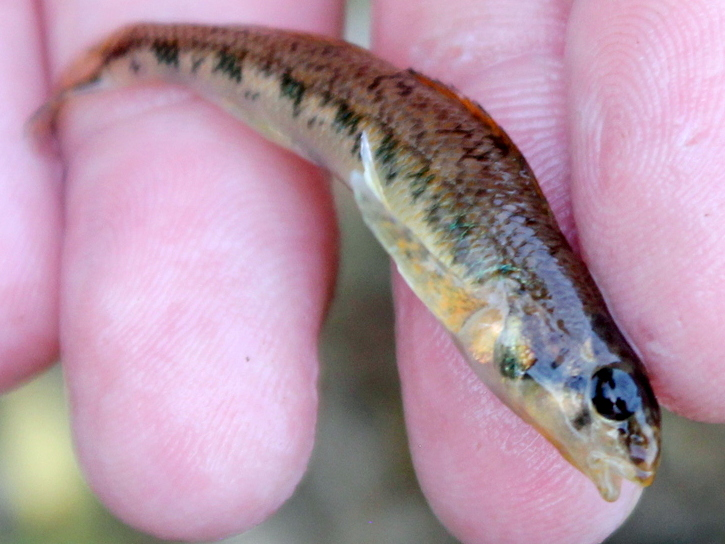

Scientific classification
- Kingdom: Animalia
- Phylum: Chordata
- Class: Actinopterygii
- Order: Perciformes
- Family: Percidae
- Genus: Etheostoma
- Species: E. obama

Binomial name
- Etheostoma obama Mayden & Layman, 2012

= Etheostoma obama =

Species of fish

Etheostoma obama, the spangled darter, is a species of freshwater ray-finned fish, a darter from the subfamily Etheostomatinae, part of the family Percidae, which also contains the perches, ruffes and pikeperches. It is endemic to the eastern United States where it is only known to occur in the Duck River and the Buffalo River, both in Tennessee.

== Discovery and naming ==
Steven Layman of Geosyntec Consultants and Rick Mayden of Saint Louis University studied the freshwater darters, most of which are native to Alabama and Tennessee in the United States. While they were studying color variation of Etheostoma stigmaeum, the speckled darter, Layman and Mayden discovered that there were populations with enough variation that they should be described as unique species.

This species was one of five distinct species of fish that were named after former U.S. presidents and a vice-president, based on their leadership in conservation. E. obama was named after Barack Obama, for his work "particularly in the areas of clean energy and environmental protection, and because he is one of our first leaders to approach conservation and environmental protection from a more global vision," according to Layman.

== Description ==
Etheostoma obama males have bright orange and iridescent blue speckles, stripes, and checked patterns, with a bright fan-shaped fin that has orange stripes. The males can reach up to 48 mm (1.9 in) long, while the females reach 43 mm (1.7 in) long. 29% of the studied fish had palatine teeth.

== See also ==
- List of things named after Barack Obama
- List of organisms named after famous people (born 1950–1974)
