= Caloplaca obamae =

Conservation status
- Critically Imperiled (NatureServe)

Scientific classification
- Kingdom: Fungi
- Division: Ascomycota
- Class: Lecanoromycetes
- Order: Teloschistales
- Family: Teloschistaceae
- Genus: Caloplaca
- Species: C. obamae

Binomial name
- Caloplaca obamae Knudsen (2009)

Species of lichen

Caloplaca obamae is a species of crustose lichen in the fungus genus Caloplaca. It is the first species to be named in honor of United States President Barack Obama. C. obamae was discovered in 2007 by Kerry Knudsen on Santa Rosa Island in California and published in March 2009. Knudsen stated that he chose to honor Obama for "his support of science and scientific education" and wrote the manuscript for publication of the species in the time between Obama's election and his inauguration.

== Description ==
Caloplaca obamae produces a thin thallus arranged in orange granules that are 30–50 μm in diameter and form patches that can be 0.2–1 mm in diameter, ultimately covering an area on the soil up to 6–7 cm^{2}. The algal layer is discontinuous and usually 50–100 μm thick under the granule patches. It appears that C. obamae is sterile and does not produce ascospores; the apothecia that were present in specimens may belong to an associated species, Caloplaca ludificans. Caloplaca obamae is similar in appearance to Caloplaca xanthostigmoidea.

== Distribution and habitat ==
Caloplaca obamae is endemic to the northern side of Santa Rosa Island on clay soils of the Pleistocene marine terraces. It has not yet been discovered on mainland California, San Miguel Island, or Sandy Point on Santa Rosa Island. It occurs from Bechers Bay to Soledad Canyon on Santa Rosa in grasslands that have been heavily grazed for over a hundred years. Introduced animal populations are being removed from the island and it has been suggested that C. obamae, which had nearly gone extinct when cattle ranches were active, will make a comeback on the island. It is commonly found growing with other terricolous lichen species and bryophytes.

== See also ==
- List of Caloplaca species
- List of things named after Barack Obama
- List of organisms named after famous people (born 1950–1974)
