= Lamiasaurus =

Lamiasaurus Temporal range: Capitanian

Scientific classification
- Domain: Eukaryota
- Kingdom: Animalia
- Phylum: Chordata
- Clade: Synapsida
- Clade: Therapsida
- Suborder: †Dinocephalia
- Family: †Titanosuchidae
- Genus: †Lamiasaurus; Watson, 1914
- Species: †L. newtoni

Binomial name
- †Lamiasaurus newtoni Watson, 1914

Extinct genus of therapsids

Lamiasaurus is an extinct genus of therapsids from the Tapinocephalus Assemblage Zone of the Karoo. It is known from an indeterminate jaw fragment that may be either titanosuchid or anteosaurid.
