= Horatio G. Loomis =

Horatio G. Loomis (c. 1814) was born in Burlington, Vermont.

Loomis was a native of Vermont who came to Chicago as a pioneer settler in 1834. A grocer by trade, Loomis also was an entrepreneur who became involved in many business fields, including commodities trading.

The four financial trading exchanges of Chicago, Illinois, USA, are a vital economic asset to the international economy. Chicago, being the transportation hub of the nation's breadbasket, was the most logical location for the agricultural commodities futures contract trading business.

Loomis was one of the organizers of the Chicago Board of Trade in 1848, the city's first financial trading exchange. Initially, the CBOT dealt only in futures contracts for agricultural products. Subsequently, it began dealing in precious metals and later developed into a more broad-based futures exchange.

Loomis was elected to the first Board of Water Commissioners in 1851.

Loomis died in 1900. Loomis Street in Chicago is named for him.
