= Black Jack (stamp) =

1860s United States postage stamp

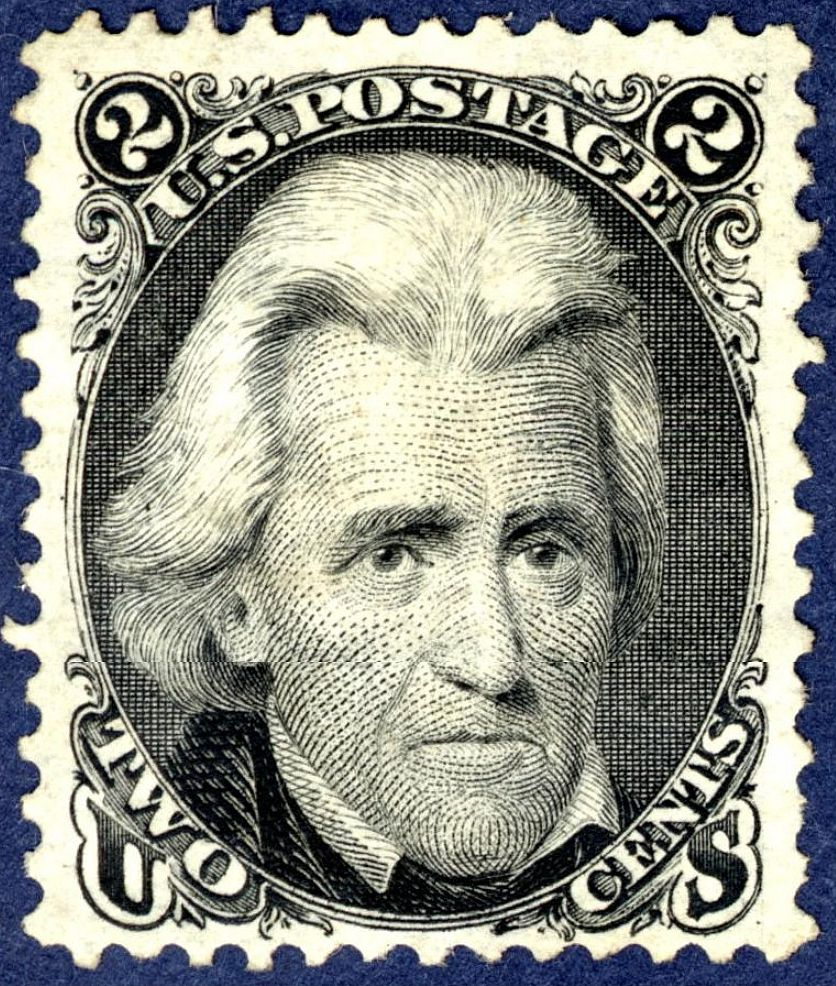
1863 "Black Jack" issue

Black Jack or Blackjack was the 2-cent denomination United States postage stamp issued from July 1, 1863 to 1869, is generally referred to as the "Black Jack" due to the large portraiture of the United States President Andrew Jackson on its face printed in pitch black. It is considered to be a key stamp in any collection of US stamps.

The stamp was issued to fulfill a need for a reduced rate, 2-Cent denomination for newspaper, magazine, and local deliveries; and was often used to "make up" higher rates, or split in half to make up lower ones (a 1-Cent stamp) due to shortages at the local post office.

During the Civil War, the "Black Jack" was supposed to have been favored by both North and South, but as soon as the South got news of the North making a stamp depicting one of their own heroes, they printed a 2-Cent stamp depicting the same portrait of Jackson on their own 'Red Jack' postage stamp in reaction.

After the War was over, poverty inspired people to wash off the cancellation from the stamps and attempt to use them again. The Government then decided to put an antitheft device onto the stamps known as a grill. This grill, which consisted of various rows of tiny indentations into the stamps, was supposed to make it impossible to wash off the cancellations without being detected; but people usually got around this by bisecting the stamp, and then reusing that portion that didn't have a cancellation on it. The first grill applied to a Black Jack stamp is known as the "Z" grill, introduced in January 1868. Over the next few months, the Post Office successively employed three smaller grill patterns (D, E and F) in the production of this stamp.

== Die varieties ==
Steven Metzger has researched the production of 2¢ Black Jacks. He has revealed more details on the different dies used than those mentioned in the Scott Specialized Catalogue. There are ‘dots in scroll’ on plate 53, found to the right of the left ‘2’. These marks are not thought to be secret marks. The ‘star on cheek’ plate variety (plate 57) was discovered by Maryette B. Lane in the 1960s. Both varieties are thought to have resulted from a rusted die.

== See also ==
- Definitive stamp
- Presidents of the United States on U.S. postage stamps

== Sources ==
- Scott Publishing Company, 2005 Specialized Catalogue of United States Stamps and Covers (2004)
- Lester G. Brookman, The 19th Century Postage Stamps of the United States (1947, vol. I) [exhaustive information about "grills"]
- Tiffany, John Kerr (1887). History of the postage stamps of the United States of America. St. Louis, Mo.: C. H. Mekell.
- Luff, John N. (1902). The postage stamps of the United States. New York: Scott Stamp & Coin Co., ltd.
