= Monroe Township, Lincoln County, Missouri =

Township of Missouri, United States

Coordinates: 38.96508°N 90.80128°W

Monroe Township is an inactive township in Lincoln County, in the U.S. state of Missouri.

Monroe Township was established in 1819, taking its name from the community of Old Monroe, Missouri.
