= List of memorials to Andrew Jackson =

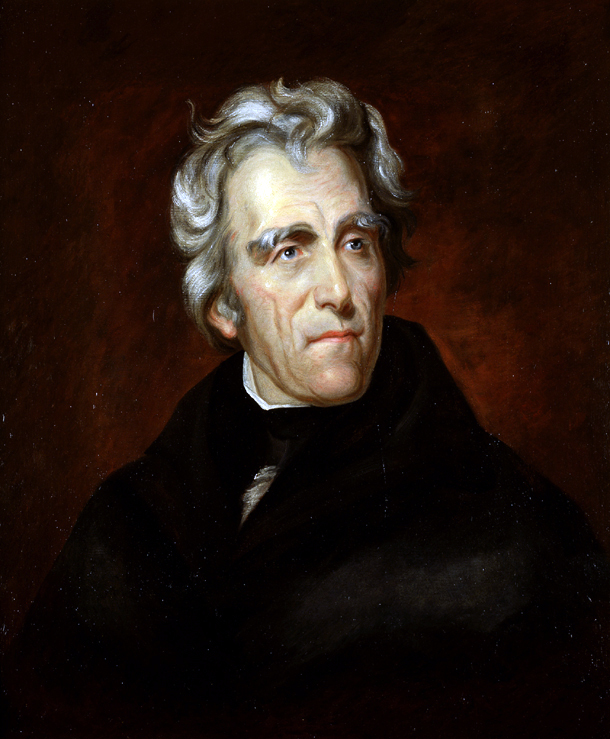
Jackson in 1824, painted by Thomas Sully

This is a list memorials to Andrew Jackson, the seventh president of the United States.

== Cities, towns, and villages ==
- Hermitage, Pennsylvania (formerly Hickory Township), after his homestead
- Hermitage, Tennessee, after his homestead
- Jackson, Alabama
- Jacksonville, Alabama
- Jackson, Kentucky
- Jackson, Louisiana
- Jackson, Michigan
- Jackson, Mississippi
- Jackson, Missouri
- Jackson, New Hampshire
- Jackson, New Jersey
- Jackson, Ohio
- Jackson, South Carolina
- Jackson, Tennessee
- Jackson Township, Indiana, a list of 47 different townships of that name
- Jacksontown, Ohio in Licking County, Ohio
- Jacksonville, Florida
- Jacksonville, Illinois
- Jacksonville, North Carolina
- Mount Jackson, Virginia
- Old Hickory, Tennessee, after his nickname

== Counties ==
- Hickory County, Missouri, after his nickname, "Old Hickory"
- Jackson County, Alabama
- Jackson County, Arkansas
- Jackson County, Colorado
- Jackson County, Florida
- Jackson County, Illinois
- Jackson County, Indiana
- Jackson County, Iowa
- Jackson County, Kansas
- Jackson County, Kentucky
- Jackson Parish, Louisiana
- Jackson County, Michigan
- Jackson County, Mississippi
- Jackson County, Missouri
- Jackson County, North Carolina
- Jackson County, Ohio
- Jackson County, Oklahoma
- Jackson County, Oregon
- Jackson County, Tennessee
- Jackson County, Texas
- Jackson County, West Virginia
- Jackson County, Wisconsin

== Educational institutions ==
- Andrew Jackson Primary School (Williamsport, Pennsylvania)
- Andrew Jackson Elementary School (Old Hickory, Tennessee)
- Andrew Jackson High School (South Carolina)
- Andrew Jackson High School (Jacksonville, Florida)
- Andrew Jackson High School (Cambria Heights, New York), Queens, New York City, New York
- Miami Jackson High School, Miami, Florida
- Andrew Jackson Language Academy, Chicago, Illinois
- Andrew Jackson Middle School (Cross Lanes, West Virginia)
- Andrew Jackson Middle School (South Carolina)
- Andrew Jackson Middle School (Titusville, Florida)
- Andrew Jackson Middle School (Albuquerque, New Mexico)
- Andrew Jackson Fundamental Magnet High School, Chalmette, Louisiana
- Andrew Jackson Academy, Forrestville, Maryland
- Andrew Jackson Public School 24Q (Flushing, New York), Queens, New York City, New York

== Military vessels ==
- The United States revenue cutter Jackson, commissioned in 1832.
- USS President Jackson in service 1941–1955.
- USS Andrew Jackson (SSBN-619), in commission in 1963–1989.

== Sculptures ==
- Four identical equestrian statues by the sculptor Clark Mills: in Lafayette Square, Washington, D.C.; in Jackson Square, New Orleans; in Nashville on the grounds of the Tennessee State Capitol; and in Jacksonville, Florida
- A statue to Jackson exists on the State Capitol grounds of Raleigh, North Carolina, entitled Presidents North Carolina Gave the Nation. He is featured alongside James Polk and Andrew Johnson, both U.S. presidents born in North Carolina.
- There is a bust of Jackson in Plaza Ferdinand VII in Pensacola, Florida, where he became the first governor of the Florida Territory in 1821.
- Bronze sculpture of Andrew Jackson by Belle Kinney Scholz and Leopold Scholz in the U.S. Capitol Building as part of the National Statuary Hall Collection
- Statue of Jackson on a horse in front of the Jackson County Courthouse in Kansas City, Missouri, erected in 1934.

== Parks ==
- Andrew Jackson State Park, South Carolina
- Jackson Park, Chicago
- Jackson Park, Seattle
- Jackson Park, Alameda, CA was denamed in July 2020; renamed to Chochenyo Park in January 2021

== Other ==
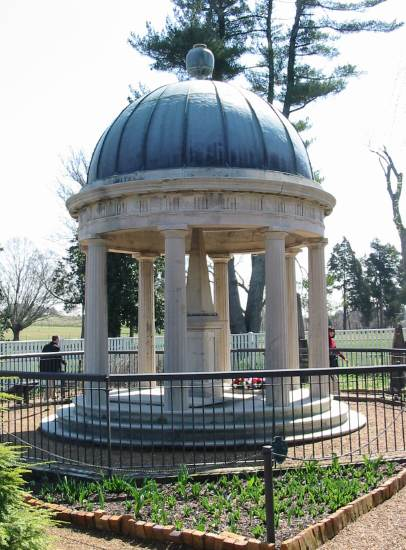
Tomb of Andrew and Rachel Jackson at The Hermitage

- Andrew Jackson Centre, Northern Ireland
- Andrew Jackson Masonic Lodge No. 120, in the Jurisdiction of Virginia
- Andrew Jackson State Office Building, in Nashville, completed in 1969
- Andrew Jackson Station (Post Office), Rolando, San Diego. - renamed to Susan A. Davis Post Office in 2023
- Fort Jackson, the U.S. Army's largest training base
- Fort Jackson, on the lower Mississippi River
- Jackson Avenue, New Orleans
- Jackson Barracks, New Orleans
- Jackson Square, New Orleans
- Jackson Street, Trenton, New Jersey
- Jackson Street, Seattle, Washington
- Old Hickory Boulevard, Tennessee
- Old Hickory Lake, Tennessee
- Tomb of Andrew and Rachel Jackson, The Hermitage, Tennessee
- Andrew Jackson Parade Float , Springtime Tallahassee. Retired in 2020.

== Portrayal on banknotes and stamps ==
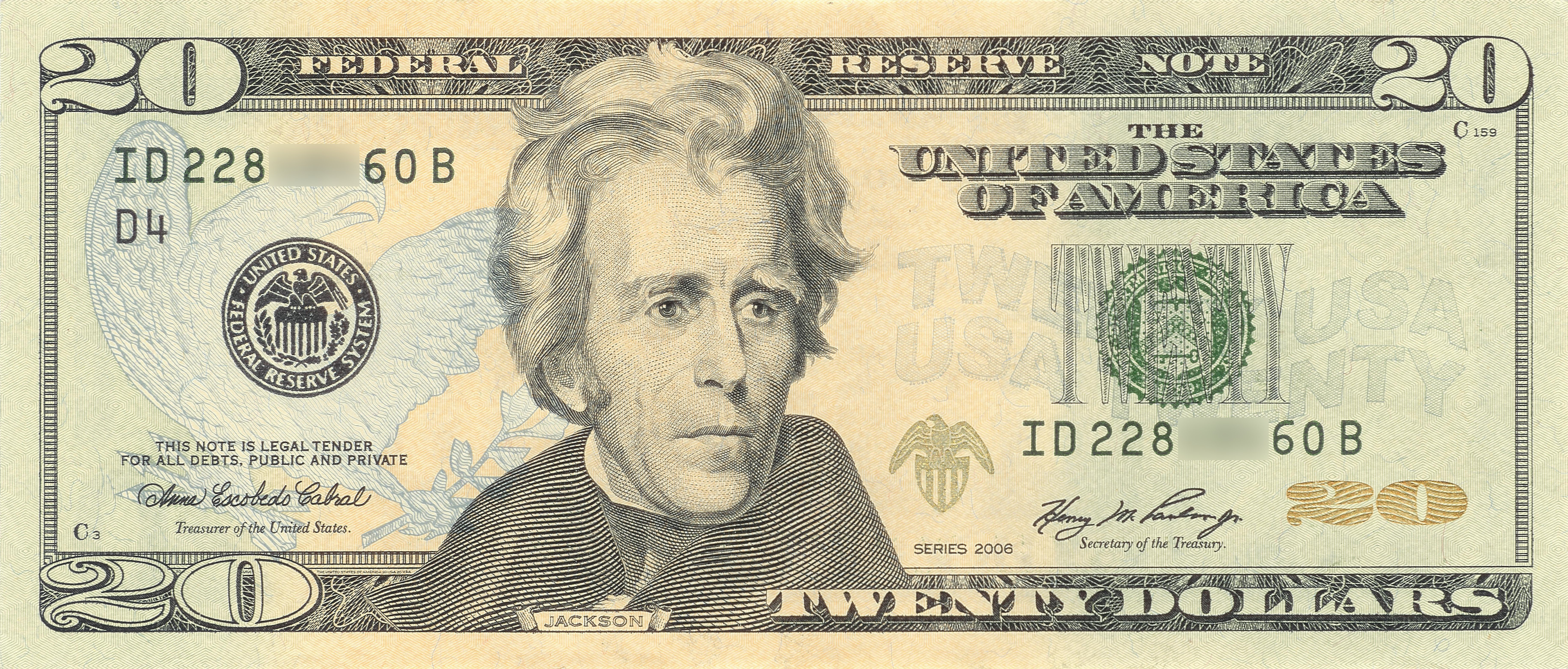
Jackson portrait on obverse $20 bill

Jackson has appeared on U.S. banknotes as far back as 1869, and extending into the 21st century. His image has appeared on the $5, $10, $20, and $10,000 note. Most recently, his image has appeared on the U.S. $20 Federal reserve note beginning in 1928. In 2016, Treasury Secretary Jack Lew announced his goal that by 2020 an image of Harriet Tubman would replace Jackson's depiction on the front side of the $20 banknote, and that an image of Jackson would be placed on the reverse side, though the final decision will be made by his successors.

Jackson has appeared on several postage stamps. He first appeared on an 1863 two-cent stamp, which is commonly referred to by collectors as the Black Jack.

Andrew Jackson is one of the few American presidents to appear on U.S. Postage more than the usual two or three times, appearing on at least twelve different issues as of 2023. The U.S. Post Office released a postage stamp in his honor 18 years after his death, with the issue of 1863, a 2-cent black issue, commonly referred to by collectors as the 'Black Jack'. due to the large portraiture of Jackson on its face printed in pitch black. During the American Civil War, the Confederate government issued two Confederate postage stamps bearing Jackson's portrait. (Note: Other stamp issues include:: file:Jackson Scott 1936 Issue-2c.jpg file:Andrew Jackson2 1883 Issue-4c.jpg file:Andrew Jackson2 1894 Issue-3c.jpg file:Andrew Jackson2 1967 Issue-10c.jpg file:Andrew Jackson2 1963 Issue-1c.jpg file:Andrew Jackson 1938 Issue-7c.jpg file:Tennessee Statehood Sesquicentennial, 3c, 1946 issue.jpg file:Battle of New Orleans, 5c, 1965 issue.jpg)

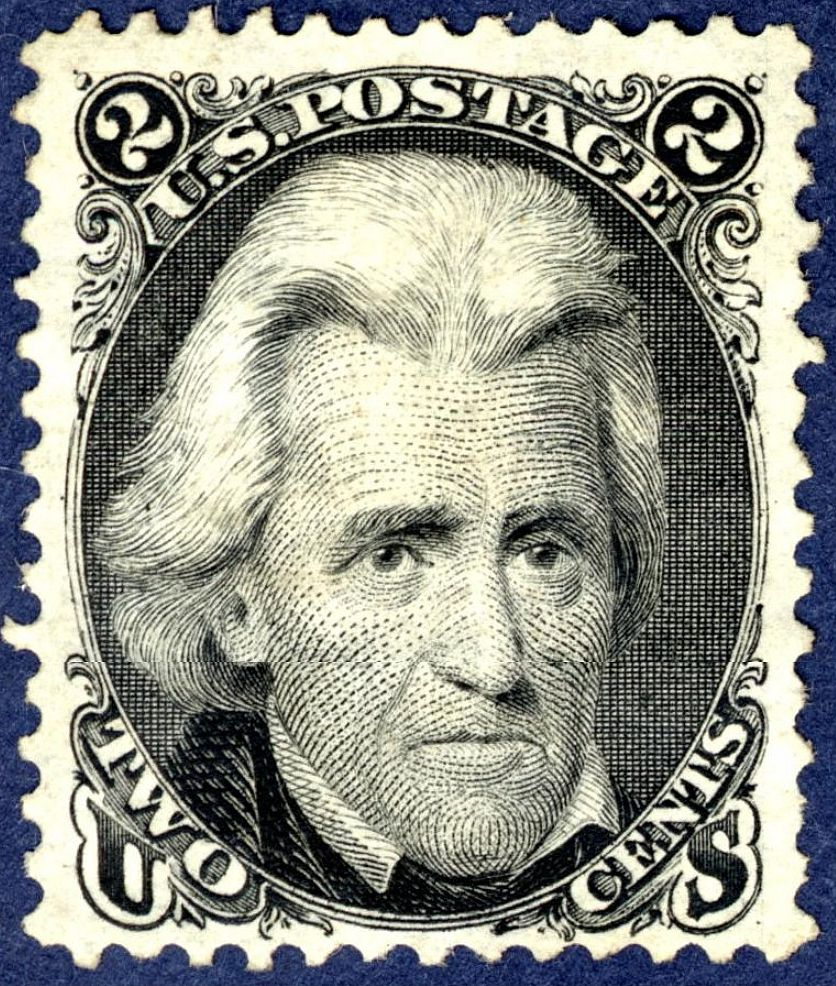
Issue of 1863

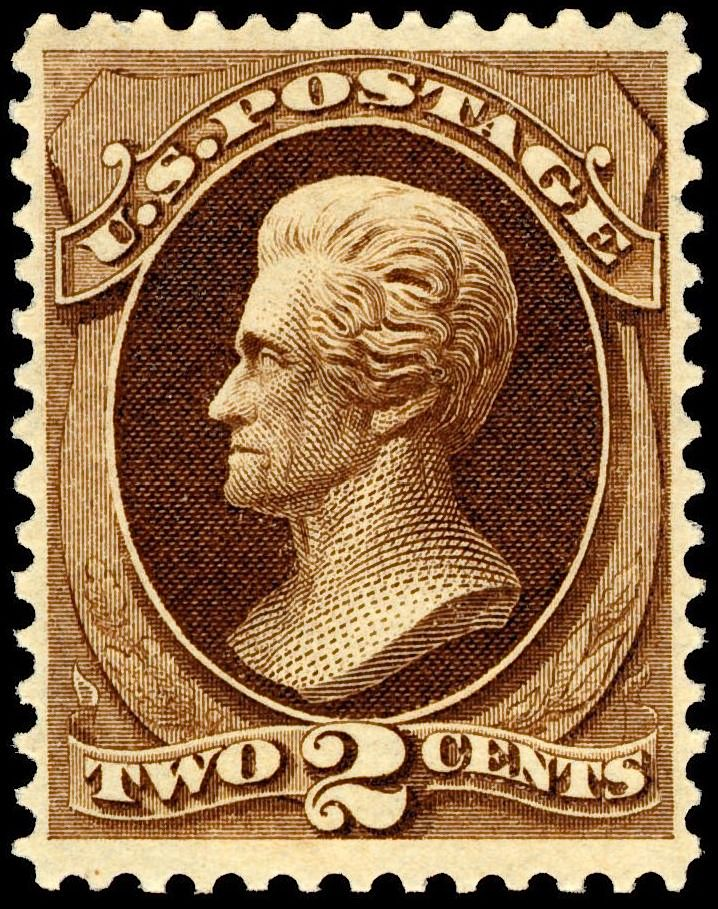
Issue of 1870

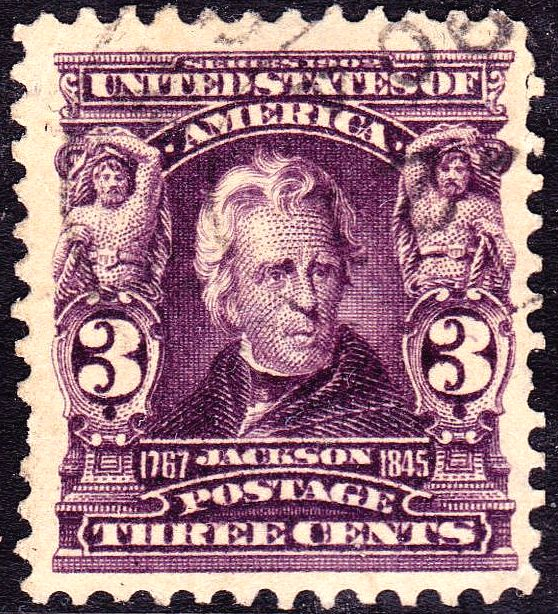
Issue of 1903

== Portrayals on flags ==
The flag of Jacksonville, depicting a silhouette of Andrew Jackson riding a horse

The current flag of Jacksonville, adopted by the Jacksonville City Council on 24 February 1976, has a silhouette of Jackson on horseback.

== Popular culture depictions ==
Jackson and his wife Rachel were the main subjects of a 1951 historical novel by Irving Stone, The President's Lady, which told the story of their lives up until Rachel's death. The novel was the basis for the 1953 film of the same name starring Charlton Heston as Jackson and Susan Hayward as Rachel.

Jackson has been a supporting character in a number of historical films and television productions. Lionel Barrymore played Jackson in The Gorgeous Hussy (1936), a fictionalized biography of Peggy Eaton starring Joan Crawford. The Buccaneer (1938), depicting the Battle of New Orleans, included Hugh Sothern as Jackson, and was remade in 1958 with Heston again playing Jackson. Brian Donlevy played Jackson in the Paramount Pictures 1942 film The Remarkable Andrew. Basil Ruysdael played Jackson in Walt Disney's 1955 Davy Crockett TV miniseries.

Jackson is the protagonist of the comedic historic rock musical Bloody Bloody Andrew Jackson (2008) with music and lyrics by Michael Friedman and book by Alex Timbers.

== See also ==
- Portraits of Andrew Jackson
- List of presidents of the United States on currency
- Presidents of the United States on U.S. postage stamps
- Presidential memorials in the United States

== Bibliography ==
- Gannett, Henry (1905). The Origin of Certain Place Names in the United States. Washington, D.C.: Myron E. Sharpe, Inc. OCLC 37302804. Archived from the original on May 4, 2016.
