= Monroe Township, Monroe County, Missouri =

Township in Monroe County, Missouri, U.S.

Coordinates: 39.6064°N 91.7628°W

Monroe Township is an inactive township in Monroe County, in the U.S. state of Missouri.

Monroe Township was established in 1831, taking its name from President James Monroe.
