= Presidential memorials in the United States =

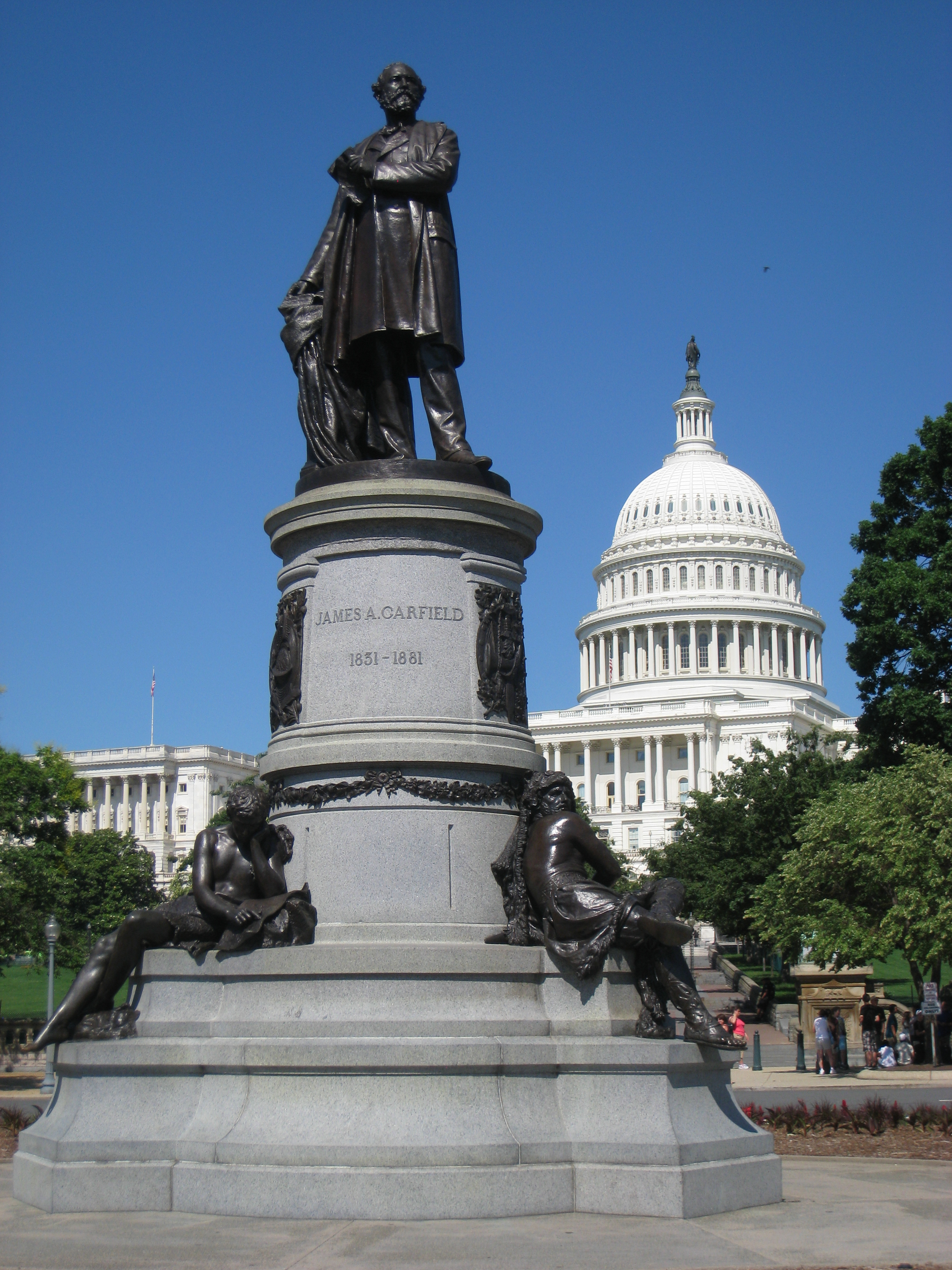
The James A. Garfield Monument in Washington, D.C.

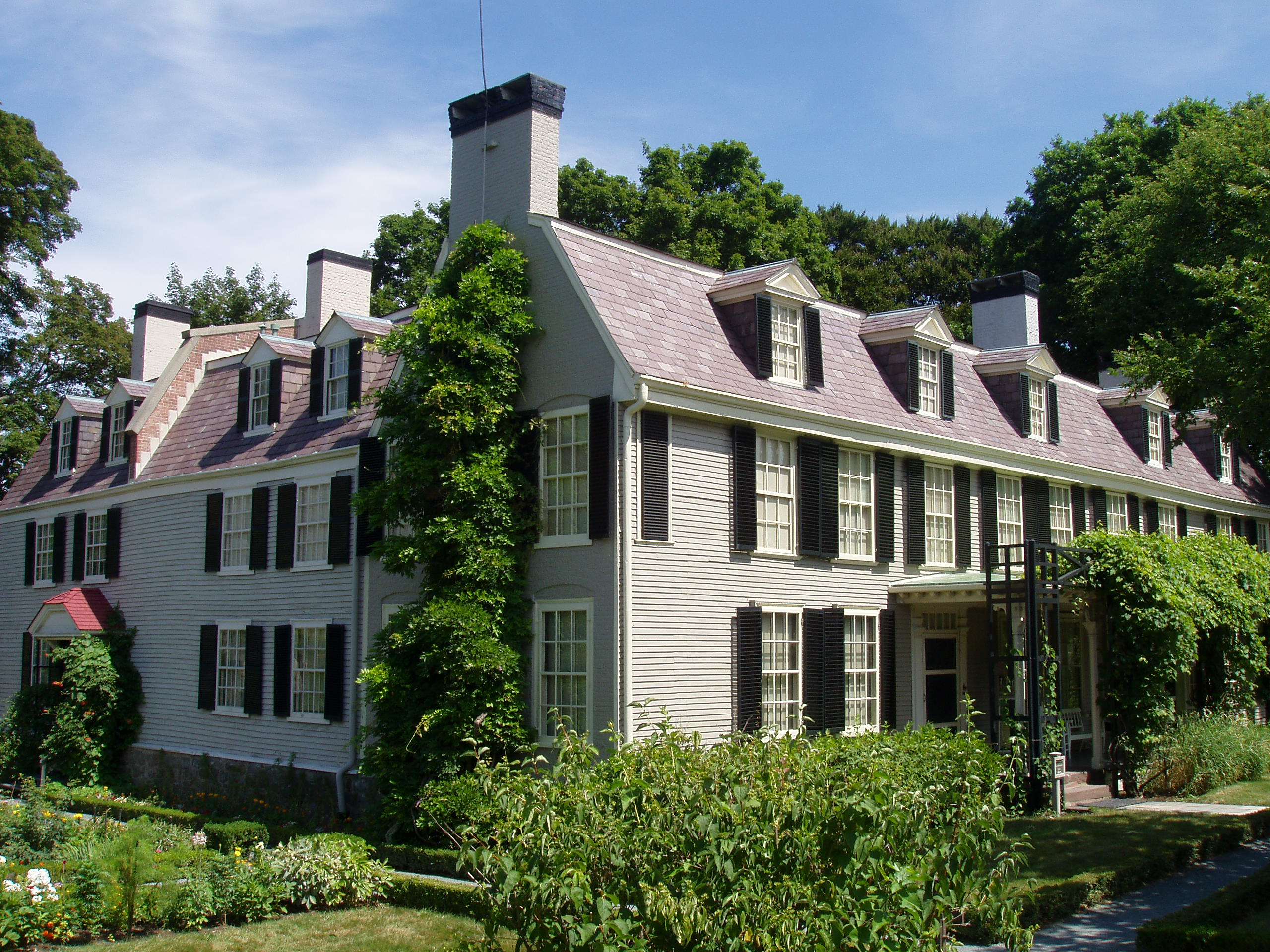
Peacefield, the home of John Adams and John Quincy Adams in Quincy, Massachusetts

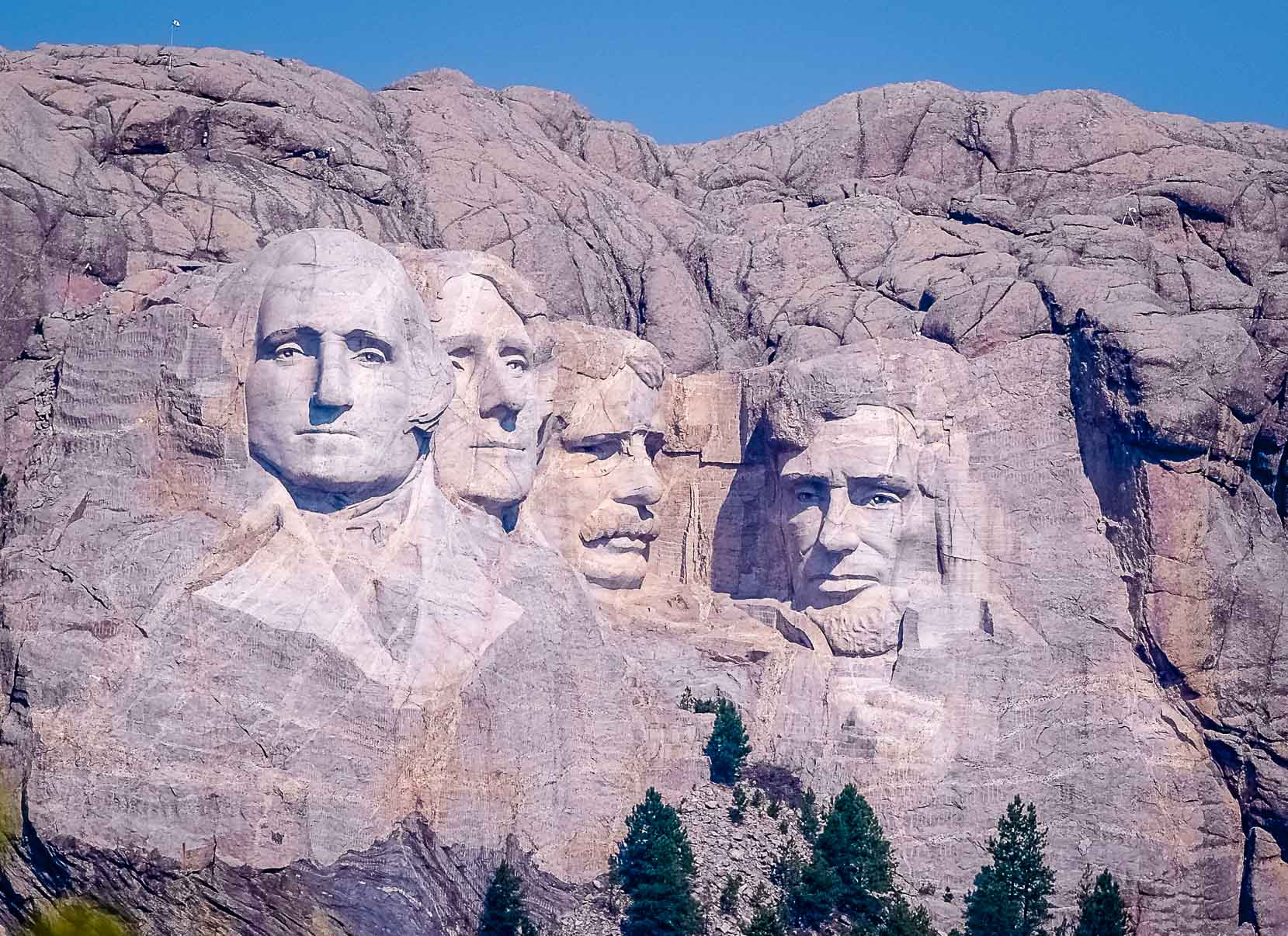
Mount Rushmore, in South Dakota, honors four U.S. presidents: George Washington, Thomas Jefferson, Theodore Roosevelt, and Abraham Lincoln.

The presidential memorials in the United States honor presidents of the United States and seek to showcase and perpetuate their legacies.

== Living and physical elements ==
A presidential memorial may have a physical element which consists of a monument, a statue within a monument, a historical home, a presidential library, and other sites whose entire presence consists of a physical structure that is a permanent remembrance of the president it represents. Most well-known presidential memorials, such as the Washington, Lincoln and Jefferson memorials, have a physical element.

There are also official presidential memorials that have a living element with only a minor physical presence. An example of a presidential living memorial is the Woodrow Wilson International Center for Scholars. Located in a wing of the Ronald Reagan Building in Washington, D.C., the Wilson Center has a small exhibit concerning President Wilson's life and work, but it is best known for its work to unite the world of ideas with the world of policy by supporting scholarship linked to issues of contemporary importance. In this way the living memorial perpetuates President Wilson's legacy of scholarship linked closely to international relations.

Similarly, the Harry S. Truman Scholarship honors U.S. college students dedicated to public service and policy leadership, and thus may be considered a memorial with solely a living element. The Truman Scholarship is the sole federal memorial allowed to honor President Truman.

This can also be accomplished through the establishment of a policy institute, like the Eisenhower Institute whose mandate is to advance Eisenhower's intellectual and leadership legacies through research, public education, and public policy recommendations.

The James Madison Memorial Building, the third and newest building of the Library of Congress, is an example of a memorial with both living and physical elements. The building houses a memorial hall to President James Madison, but is also dedicated in memory of his 1783 proposal that the Continental Congress form an official library.

== Existing presidential memorials ==
Multiple statues, homes, and other physical memorials to some presidents exist; only large structures are mentioned below:

#	President	Memorial	Location
1	George Washington	Washington Monument	Washington, D.C.
1	George Washington	Washington Monument	Baltimore, Maryland
1	George Washington	Washington Monument	Boonsboro, Maryland
1	George Washington	George Washington Masonic National Memorial	Alexandria, Virginia
1	George Washington	Ferry Farm	Stafford County, Virginia
1	George Washington	Mount Vernon	Fairfax County, Virginia
1	George Washington	Fred W. Smith National Library for the Study of George Washington	Fairfax County, Virginia
2	John Adams	Adams National Historical Park	Quincy, Massachusetts
2	John Adams	Peacefield	Quincy, Massachusetts
2	John Adams	John Adams Birthplace	Quincy, Massachusetts
2	John Adams	John Adams Building	Washington, D.C.
3	Thomas Jefferson	Jefferson Memorial	Washington, D.C.
3	Thomas Jefferson	Thomas Jefferson Building	Washington, D.C.
3	Thomas Jefferson	Monticello	Albemarle County, Virginia
4	James Madison	Montpelier	Orange County, Virginia
4	James Madison	James Madison Memorial Building	Washington, D.C.
5	James Monroe	James Monroe Museum & Memorial Library	Fredericksburg, Virginia
5	James Monroe	Highland	Albemarle County, Virginia
6	John Quincy Adams	John Quincy Adams Birthplace	Quincy, Massachusetts
6	John Quincy Adams	Peacefield	Quincy, Massachusetts
7	Andrew Jackson	Andrew Jackson Statue	Washington, D.C.
7	Andrew Jackson	The Hermitage	Nashville, Tennessee
7	Andrew Jackson	Andrew Jackson State Park	Lancaster, South Carolina
8	Martin Van Buren	Martin Van Buren National Historic Site	Kinderhook, New York
9	William Henry Harrison	Grouseland	Vincennes, Indiana
11	James K. Polk	James K. Polk Home	Columbia, Tennessee
11	James K. Polk	President James K. Polk Historic Site	Mecklenburg, North Carolina
13	Millard Fillmore	Fillmore House	East Aurora, New York
14	Franklin Pierce	Franklin Pierce Homestead	Hillsborough, New Hampshire
15	James Buchanan	James Buchanan Memorial	Washington, D.C.
15	James Buchanan	Wheatland	Lancaster Township, Pennsylvania
16	Abraham Lincoln	Lincoln Memorial	Washington, D.C.
16	Abraham Lincoln	Lincoln Highway	Interstate
16	Abraham Lincoln	Abraham Lincoln Birthplace National Historic Site	LaRue County, Kentucky
16	Abraham Lincoln	Lincoln Boyhood National Memorial	Lincoln City, Indiana
16	Abraham Lincoln	Lincoln's New Salem	New Salem, Illinois
16	Abraham Lincoln	Lincoln Home National Historic Site	Springfield, Illinois
16	Abraham Lincoln	Ford's Theatre National Historic Site	Washington, D.C.
16	Abraham Lincoln	Lincoln Tomb	Springfield, Illinois
16	Abraham Lincoln	Abraham Lincoln Presidential Library and Museum	Springfield, Illinois
17	Andrew Johnson	President Andrew Johnson Museum and Library	Greeneville, Tennessee
17	Andrew Johnson	Andrew Johnson National Historic Site	Greeneville, Tennessee
18	Ulysses S. Grant	Ulysses S. Grant Memorial	Washington, D.C.
18	Ulysses S. Grant	General Grant National Memorial	Upper Manhattan, New York
18	Ulysses S. Grant	Ulysses S. Grant National Historic Site	Grantwood Village, Missouri
19	Rutherford B. Hayes	Spiegel Grove	Fremont, Ohio
19	Rutherford B. Hayes	Rutherford B. Hayes Presidential Center	Fremont, Ohio
20	James A. Garfield	James A. Garfield Memorial	Cleveland, Ohio
20	James A. Garfield	James A. Garfield Monument	Washington, D.C.
20	James A. Garfield	James A. Garfield National Historic Site	Mentor, Ohio
22, 24	Grover Cleveland	Grover Cleveland Birthplace	Caldwell, New Jersey
23	Benjamin Harrison	Benjamin Harrison memorial statue	Indianapolis, Indiana
23	Benjamin Harrison	Benjamin Harrison Presidential Site	Indianapolis, Indiana
25	William McKinley	McKinley National Memorial	Canton, Ohio
25	William McKinley	National McKinley Birthplace Memorial	Niles, Ohio
25	William McKinley	William McKinley Monument	Columbus, Ohio
26	Theodore Roosevelt	Theodore Roosevelt Birthplace National Historic Site	Manhattan, New York
26	Theodore Roosevelt	Theodore Roosevelt Inaugural National Historic Site	Buffalo, New York
26	Theodore Roosevelt	Sagamore Hill National Historic Site	Cove Neck, New York
26	Theodore Roosevelt	Theodore Roosevelt National Park	North Dakota
26	Theodore Roosevelt	Maltese Cross Cabin	Medora, North Dakota
26	Theodore Roosevelt	Pine Knot cabin	Albemarle County, Virginia
26	Theodore Roosevelt	Theodore Roosevelt Island	Washington, D.C.
26	Theodore Roosevelt	Theodore Roosevelt Monument	Tenafly, New Jersey
26	Theodore Roosevelt	Theodore Roosevelt Presidential Library	Medora, North Dakota
27	William Howard Taft	William Howard Taft National Historic Site	Cincinnati, Ohio
28	Woodrow Wilson	Woodrow Wilson Boyhood Home	Augusta, Georgia
28	Woodrow Wilson	Woodrow Wilson House	Washington, D.C.
28	Woodrow Wilson	Woodrow Wilson Presidential Library	Staunton, Virginia
28	Woodrow Wilson	Woodrow Wilson International Center for Scholars	Washington, D.C.
29	Warren G. Harding	Harding Home	Marion, Ohio
29	Warren G. Harding	Harding Tomb	Marion, Ohio
30	Calvin Coolidge	Coolidge Homestead	Plymouth Notch, Vermont
30	Calvin Coolidge	Calvin Coolidge House	Northampton, Massachusetts
30	Calvin Coolidge	Calvin Coolidge Presidential Library and Museum	Northampton, Massachusetts
31	Herbert Hoover	Hoover Tower	Stanford, California
31	Herbert Hoover	Herbert Hoover Presidential Library and Museum	West Branch, Iowa
32	Franklin D. Roosevelt	Home of Franklin D. Roosevelt National Historic Site	Hyde Park, New York
32	Franklin D. Roosevelt	Franklin D. Roosevelt Presidential Library and Museum	Hyde Park, New York
32	Franklin D. Roosevelt	Franklin Delano Roosevelt Memorial	Washington, D.C.
32	Franklin D. Roosevelt	Franklin Delano Roosevelt Memorial Stone	Washington, D.C.
32	Franklin D. Roosevelt	Franklin D. Roosevelt Four Freedoms Park	New York, New York
32	Franklin D. Roosevelt	Roosevelt Island	New York, New York
33	Harry S. Truman	Harry S. Truman National Historic Site	Kansas City, Missouri
33	Harry S. Truman	Harry S. Truman Presidential Library and Museum	Independence, Missouri
33	Harry S. Truman	Harry S. Truman Scholarship	
34	Dwight D. Eisenhower	Eisenhower National Historic Site	Cumberland Township, Pennsylvania
34	Dwight D. Eisenhower	Dwight D. Eisenhower Presidential Library, Museum and Boyhood Home	Abilene, Kansas
34	Dwight D. Eisenhower	Dwight D. Eisenhower Memorial	Washington, D.C.
34	Dwight D. Eisenhower	Eisenhower Executive Office Building	Washington, D.C.
35	John F. Kennedy	John F. Kennedy Center for the Performing Arts	Washington, D.C.
35	John F. Kennedy	John F. Kennedy National Historic Site	Brookline, Massachusetts
35	John F. Kennedy	John F. Kennedy Eternal Flame	Arlington, Virginia
35	John F. Kennedy	John Fitzgerald Kennedy Memorial	Dallas, Texas
35	John F. Kennedy	John F. Kennedy Presidential Library and Museum	Boston, Massachusetts
36	Lyndon B. Johnson	Lyndon B. Johnson National Historical Park	Gillespie County, Texas
36	Lyndon B. Johnson	Lyndon B. Johnson State Park and Historic Site	Gillespie County, Texas
36	Lyndon B. Johnson	Lyndon Baines Johnson Memorial Grove on the Potomac	Washington, D.C.
36	Lyndon B. Johnson	Lyndon B. Johnson Presidential Library and Museum	Austin, Texas
37	Richard Nixon	Richard Nixon Presidential Library and Museum	Yorba Linda, California
37	Richard Nixon	Birthplace of Richard Nixon	Yorba Linda, California
38	Gerald R. Ford	Gerald R. Ford Presidential Library	Ann Arbor, Michigan
38	Gerald R. Ford	Gerald R. Ford Presidential Museum	Grand Rapids, Michigan
39	Jimmy Carter	Jimmy Carter National Historical Park	Plains, Georgia
39	Jimmy Carter	Jimmy Carter Presidential Library and Museum	Atlanta, Georgia
40	Ronald Reagan	Ronald Reagan Presidential Library and Museum	Simi Valley, California
40	Ronald Reagan	Ronald Reagan Building	Washington, D.C.
41	George H. W. Bush	George H.W. Bush Presidential Library and Museum	College Station, Texas
41	George H. W. Bush	George Bush Center for Intelligence	Langley, Virginia
41	George H. W. Bush	George Bush Park	Houston, Texas
42	Bill Clinton	Clinton Presidential Center	Little Rock, Arkansas
42	Bill Clinton	President William Jefferson Clinton Birthplace Home National Historic Site	Hope, Arkansas
43	George W. Bush	George W. Bush Presidential Center	University Park, Texas
44	Barack Obama	Barack Obama Presidential Library and Museum	Chicago, Illinois
45, 47	Donald Trump	Donald J. Trump Presidential Library	Currently online, planned to be constructed in Miami, Florida
46	Joe Biden	Joseph R. Biden Jr. Presidential Library	Currently online, planned to be constructed in Delaware
	Collective	Mount Rushmore	Black Hills, South Dakota
	Collective	George H.W. Bush And George W. Bush United States Court House	Midland, Texas

== See also ==
- List of buildings and monuments honoring presidents of the United States in other countries
- List of national memorials of the United States
- List of memorials to George Washington
- List of memorials to Thomas Jefferson
- List of memorials to James Monroe
- List of memorials to Andrew Jackson
- List of memorials to William Henry Harrison
- List of memorials to John Tyler
- List of memorials to James K. Polk
- List of memorials to Theodore Roosevelt
- List of things named after Ronald Reagan
- List of things named after George H. W. Bush
- List of things named after Bill Clinton
- List of things named after Barack Obama
- List of things named after Donald Trump
- List of things named after Joe Biden
- National Historic Landmark
- National Register of Historic Places
- List of residences of presidents of the United States
- List of burial places of presidents and vice presidents of the United States
- List of educational institutions named after presidents
- List of sculptures of presidents of the United States
- Presidential library system
