= List of memorials to James Monroe =

This is a list of memorials to James Monroe, a Founding Father and the fifth president of the United States.

== United States ==
=== Academic buildings ===
There are academic buildings named after him at the University of Mary Washington, College of William and Mary, George Mason University, and George Washington University. In addition, a statue of Monroe was dedicated in front of Tucker Hall on the campus of the College of William & Mary in 2015.

=== Cities, towns, or villages ===
- Monroe, Connecticut
- Monroe, Georgia
- Monroe, Adams County, Indiana
- Monroe, Iowa
- Monroe, Louisiana
- Monroe, Maine
- Monroe, Massachusetts
- Monroe, Michigan
- Monroe, Nebraska
- Monroe, New Hampshire
- Monroe, New York
- Monroe, North Carolina
- Monroe, Ohio
- Monroe, Oregon
- Monroe, Pennsylvania
- Monroe, South Dakota
- Monroe, Utah
- Monroe, Washington
- Monroe, Wisconsin
- Monroe City, Indiana
- Monroe City, Missouri
- Monroeville, Alabama
- Monrovia, California
- Old Monroe, Missouri
- South Monroe, Michigan
- West Monroe, Louisiana
- West Monroe, Michigan
- West Monroe, New York

=== Counties ===
- Monroe County, Alabama
- Monroe County, Arkansas
- Monroe County, Florida
- Monroe County, Georgia
- Monroe County, Illinois
- Monroe County, Indiana
- Monroe County, Iowa
- Monroe County, Kentucky
- Monroe County, Michigan
- Monroe County, Mississippi
- Monroe County, Missouri
- Monroe County, New York
- Monroe County, Ohio
- Monroe County, Pennsylvania
- Monroe County, Tennessee
- Monroe County, West Virginia
- Monroe County, Wisconsin

=== Townships ===
- Monroe Town, Adams County, Wisconsin
- Monroe Town, Green County, Wisconsin
- Monroe Township, Sevier County, Arkansas
- Monroe Township, Mississippi County, Arkansas
- Monroe Township, Ogle County, Illinois
- Monroe Township, Adams County, Indiana
- Monroe Township, Allen County, Indiana
- Monroe Township, Carroll County, Indiana
- Monroe Township, Clark County, Indiana
- Monroe Township, Delaware County, Indiana
- Monroe Township, Grant County, Indiana
- Monroe Township, Howard County, Indiana
- Monroe Township, Jefferson County, Indiana
- Monroe Township, Kosciusko County, Indiana
- Monroe Township, Madison County, Indiana
- Monroe Township, Morgan County, Indiana
- Monroe Township, Pike County, Indiana
- Monroe Township, Pulaski County, Indiana
- Monroe Township, Putnam County, Indiana
- Monroe Township, Randolph County, Indiana
- Monroe Township, Washington County, Indiana
- Monroe Township, Benton County, Iowa
- Monroe Township, Butler County, Iowa
- Monroe Township, Fremont County, Iowa
- Monroe Township, Johnson County, Iowa
- Monroe Township, Linn County, Iowa
- Monroe Township, Madison County, Iowa
- Monroe Township, Mahaska County, Iowa
- Monroe Township, Monroe County, Iowa
- Monroe Township, Ringold County, Iowa
- Monroe Township, Shelby County, Iowa
- Monroe Township, Wayne County, Iowa
- Monroe Township, Anderson County, Kansas
- Monroe Charter Township, Michigan
- Monroe Township, Michigan
- Monroe Township, Minnesota
- Monroe Township, Andrew County, Missouri
- Monroe Township, Daviess County, Missouri
- Monroe Township, Lincoln County, Missouri
- Monroe Township, Livingston County, Missouri
- Monroe Township, Monroe County, Missouri
- Monroe Township, Nodaway County, Missouri
- Monroe Township, Platte County, Nebraska
- Monroe Township, Gloucester County, New Jersey
- Monroe Township, Middlesex County, New Jersey
- Monroe Township, Guilford County, North Carolina
- Monroe Township, Union County, North Carolina
- Monroe Township, Towner County, North Dakota
- Monroe Township, Adams County, Ohio
- Monroe Township, Allen County, Ohio
- Monroe Township, Ashtabula County, Ohio
- Monroe Township, Carroll County, Ohio
- Monroe Township, Clermont County, Ohio
- Monroe Township, Coshocton County, Ohio
- Monroe Township, Darke County, Ohio
- Monroe Township, Guernsey County, Ohio
- Monroe Township, Harrison County, Ohio
- Monroe Township, Henry County, Ohio
- Monroe Township, Holmes County, Ohio
- Monroe Township, Knox County, Ohio
- Monroe Township, Licking County, Ohio
- Monroe Township, Logan County, Ohio
- Monroe Township, Miami County, Ohio
- Monroe Township, Madison County, Ohio
- Monroe Township, Muskingum County, Ohio
- Monroe Township, Perry County, Ohio
- Monroe Township, Pickaway County, Ohio
- Monroe Township, Preble County, Ohio
- Monroe Township, Putnam County, Ohio
- Monroe Township, Richland County, Ohio
- Monroe Township, Bedford County, Pennsylvania
- Monroe Township, Bradford County, Pennsylvania
- Monroe Township, Clarion County, Pennsylvania
- Monroe Township, Cumberland County, Pennsylvania
- Monroe Township, Juniata County, Pennsylvania
- Monroe Township, Snyder County, Pennsylvania
- Monroe Township, Wyoming County, Pennsylvania
- Monroe Township, Turner County, South Dakota

=== Unincorporated communities ===
- Monroe City, Illinois
- Monrovia, Maryland

=== Other ===
- Fort Monroe, Virginia
- Lake Monroe, Florida
- Lake Monroe, Indiana
- Monroe University, New York
- James Monroe High School, Bronx New York
- James Monroe Middle School, Ridgecrest CA
- Monroe Avenue and Monroe Center Street, two major thoroughfares in downtown Grand Rapids, Michigan
- Monroe North, a neighborhood and business district in Grand Rapids, Michigan
- Monroe Street, New Haven, Connecticut
- Monroe Street, Trenton, New Jersey
- Mount Monroe, one of a number of mountains named for presidents of the United States in the White Mountains of New Hampshire
- North Monroe Avenue, Lindenhurst, New York

== Elsewhere ==
- Monrovia, Liberia

== See also ==
- Presidential memorials in the United States
