= List of things named after Barack Obama =

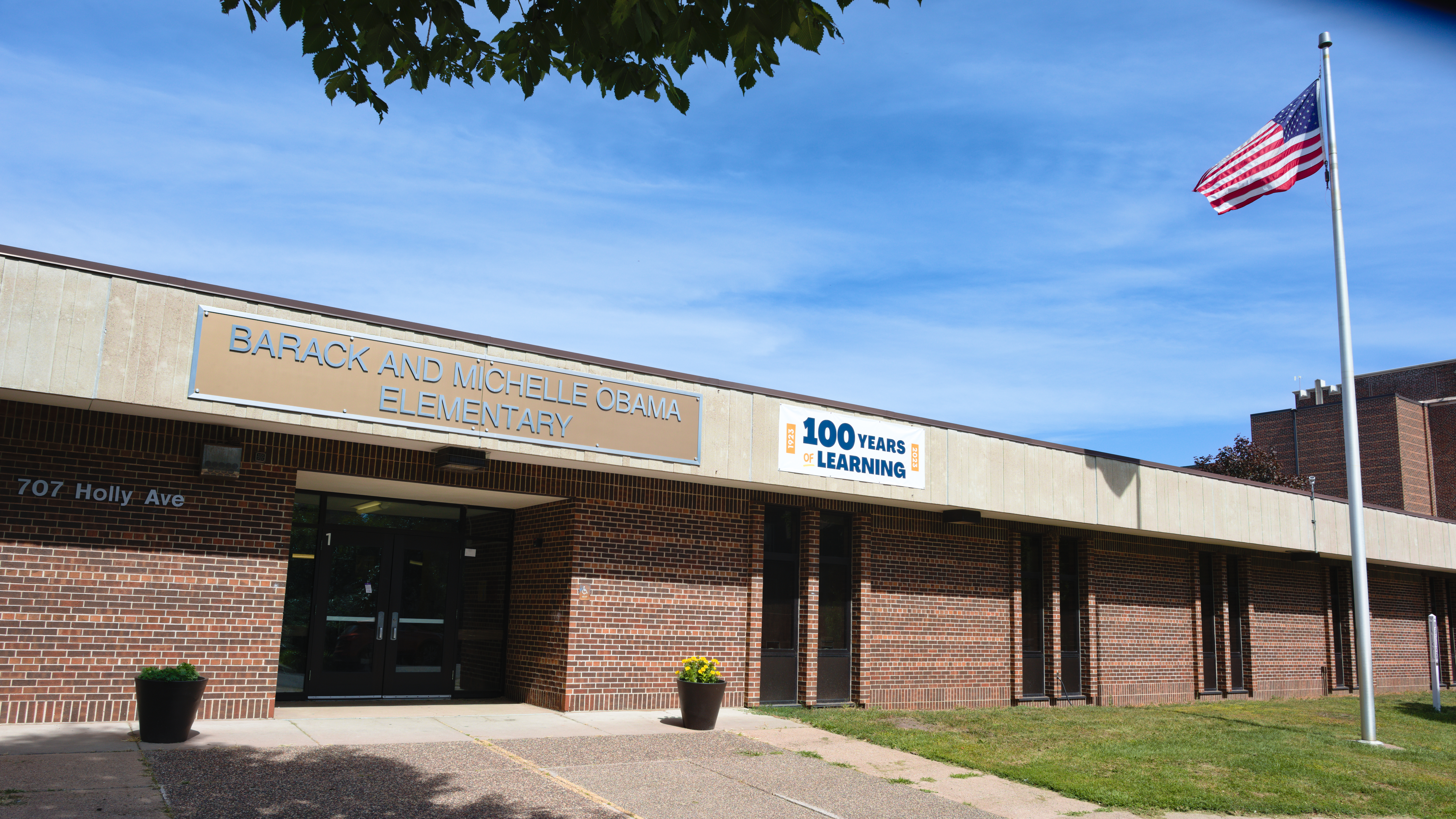
Barack and Michelle Obama Service Learning Elementary in Saint Paul, Minnesota, in 2023

This is a list of things named after Barack Obama, the 44th president of the United States. This list includes proposed name changes.

== Organisms ==
=== Biota ===
Barack Obama has been commemorated in the scientific names of at least 14 species, the most of any U.S. president.

==== Animals ====
- Aptostichus barackobamai, a species of water trapdoor spiders
- Baracktrema obamai, a blood fluke found in Malaysian turtles
- Desmopachria barackobamai, a diving beetle from French Guiana
- Etheostoma obama, a darter species
- Lasioglossum obamai, a Cuban bee
- Nystalus obamai (western striolated puffbird), a bird from the Amazon
- Obamadon gracilis, an extinct lizard
- Paragordius obamai, a parasitic worm from phylum Nematomorpha
- Placida barackobamai, a sea slug
- Spintharus barackobamai, a Cuban spider
- Teleogramma obamaorum, a cichlid, honoring Barack Obama and First Lady Michelle Obama
- Tosanoides obama, a fish discovered in the Papahanaumokuakea Marine National Monument
- Obamus coronatus, an Ediacaran organism

However, the genus name Obama (flatworm) and in particular the invasive species Obama nungara were not named after Barack Obama. The name "Obama" in this case is a coincidence and is derived from the Tupi language (which is spoken in the same area where the flatworm was discovered) where it comes from the words "oba" ("leaf") and "ma" ("animal"), which is a reference to the body shape of species in this genus.

==== Fungi ====
- Caloplaca obamae, a lichen species

=== Individual animals ===
- Barack Obama, a horse which competed in endurance games

== Schools ==
=== California ===
- Barack Obama Academy – Oakland, California – Alternative Learning Community renamed after Barack Obama in March 2009
- Barack Obama Global Preparation Academy – Los Angeles – Built in mid 2010
- Barack Obama Charter School – Compton, California – Qued Charter Elementary School renamed after Barack Obama in January 2009

=== Connecticut ===
- Barack H. Obama Magnet University School – New Haven, Connecticut – Connecticut school named after former President Obama

=== Georgia ===
- Barack H. Obama Elementary Magnet School of Technology – Atlanta, Georgia – Opened in January 2017
- Barack and Michelle Obama Academy – Atlanta, Georgia – Renamed in November 2016

=== Illinois ===
- Barack Obama School of Leadership and STEM – Chicago Heights, Illinois

=== Maryland ===
- Barack Obama Elementary School – Prince George's County, near Upper Marlboro – Prince George's County Public Schools – Named after Barack Obama in June 2009 while under construction In the 2010 U.S. census, it was in the Westphalia census-designated place, but was moved to the Brown Station CDP in the 2020 U.S. census.

=== Michigan ===
- Barack Obama Leadership Academy – Detroit, Michigan – Timbuktu Academy, which has been open since 1997, will become Barack Obama Leadership Academy

=== Minnesota ===
- Barack and Michelle Obama Service Learning Elementary – Saint Paul, Minnesota

=== Mississippi ===
- Barack Obama International Baccalaureate Elementary School – Jackson, Mississippi – Renamed as of October 2017, from Jefferson Davis, the Confederacy's only president

=== Missouri ===
- Barack Obama Elementary School – Pine Lawn, Missouri – dedicated as Barack Obama Elementary School in August 2011.

=== New Jersey ===
- Barack Obama Elementary School – Asbury Park, New Jersey – Asbury Park Public Schools – Formerly Bangs Avenue Elementary School
- Barack Obama Academy – Plainfield, New Jersey – Plainfield Academy for Academic & Civic Development renamed to Barack Obama Academy
- Barack Obama Green Charter High School – Plainfield, New Jersey – Charter high school opened in September 2010
- Barack Obama Elementary School – Jersey City, New Jersey – Jersey City Public Schools

=== New York ===
- Barack Obama Elementary School – Hempstead, New York – Ludlum Elementary School renamed to Barack Obama Elementary School

=== Ohio ===
- Barack Obama Elementary School – Maple Heights, Ohio – 4–5

=== Pennsylvania ===
- Obama High School – Pittsburgh, Pennsylvania – Pittsburgh IB World 6–12 renamed to Pittsburgh Obama High School

=== Texas ===
- Barack Obama Male Leadership Academy – Dallas, Texas – all male, grades 6–10
- Barack and Michelle Obama 9th Grade Campus – Lancaster, Texas

=== Virginia ===
- Barack Obama Elementary School – Richmond – Renamed in 2018, formerly named after J. E. B. Stuart. This may be the first school renamed from a Confederate general to President Obama. Although a plurality of students indicated in a survey that they would prefer the term "Northside Elementary," the Richmond School Board decided to go with the Barack Obama Elementary School, which received the second-highest number of votes.

=== Wisconsin ===
- Barack Obama School for Career and Technical Education – Milwaukee, Wisconsin – PK-12

== Streets ==
=== Spain ===
- Avinguda Barack Obama – In 2008, a street in the town of Nàquera in Valencia, Spain, was named in honor of Barack Obama for being "an icon of multiculturalism". The street was formerly named after José Antonio Primo de Rivera, founder of the fascist party Falange and son of Spanish dictator Miguel Primo de Rivera.

=== Tanzania ===
- Barack Obama Drive – A road in the Tanzanian city Dar es Salaam was renamed in honor of Obama's visit to the country in July 2013. The road, located by the Indian Ocean, leads to the Tanzanian State House. It was previously known as Ocean Road.

=== United States ===
==== California ====
- Obama Way – Seaside, California – renamed from Broadway Avenue effective September 15, 2010.
- Obama Boulevard – Los Angeles, California – renamed from Rodeo Road officially on May 5, 2019.
- President Barack H. Obama Highway – Glendale, California, Pasadena, California, and Los Angeles, California – renaming of a section of California State Route 134 (part of the "Ventura Freeway", officially signed on December 20, 2018.
- Barack Obama Boulevard – San Jose, California – Rename portions of Bird Avenue, South Montgomery Street, South Autumn Street and North Autumn Street to Barack Obama Boulevard, approved January 5, 2021, and signposted August 21, 2021

==== Florida ====
- Barack Obama Avenue – Opa-locka, Florida – City commission approved the renaming of Perviz Avenue effective Presidents' Day, February 2009.
- Barack Obama Boulevard – West Park, Florida – City commission approved the renaming of SW 40th Ave, Effective July 2009.
- President Barack Obama Parkway – Orlando, Florida – approximately 1 1/2 miles in length; includes sidewalks and bike lanes.
- Barack Obama Boulevard – Pahokee, Florida
- President Barack Obama Highway within the limits of Riviera Beach, Florida
- Barack Obama Boulevard – Quincy, Florida

==== Georgia ====
- Barack Obama Boulevard – Valdosta, Georgia --On July 22, 2021, the Valdosta city council approved the renaming of Forrest Street, previously named for Nathan Bedford Forrest, to Barack Obama Boulevard.

==== Illinois ====
- South Barack Obama Avenue – East St. Louis, Illinois – City council approved the renaming of a half mile section of 4th street to Barack Obama Avenue in August 2012.
- Barack Obama Presidential Expressway – In July 2017, the Illinois General Assembly voted to name a section of Interstate 55 the Barack Obama Presidential Expressway.

==== Indiana ====
- Barack Obama Way – New Albany, Indiana – a section of Reas Lane was renamed in the last week of Obama's presidency to honor the fact that "Obama's stimulus plan has helped the city create new jobs and facilitate economic development."

==== Missouri ====
- President Barack Obama Boulevard – St. Louis, Missouri – Part of Delmar Boulevard given honorary renaming to Obama Boulevard, even though the postal address will retain Delmar Boulevard.

==== Mississippi ====
- Barack Obama Avenue – Ruleville, Mississippi

==== Ohio ====
- President Barack Obama Avenue – Cincinnati, Ohio – Cincinnati City Council approved a project to rename Reading Road from Downtown Cincinnati to Reading, pending private donations; all 30,000 signs were installed by September 2021

== Topographical features ==
- Mount Obama in Antigua and Barbuda – renamed from Boggy Peak on Obama's birthday, August 4, 2009. The name was changed back to Boggy Peak in 2016.
- Obama Kissing Rock in Chicago, Illinois

== Other facilities ==
- The Barack Obama Plaza – a motorway service area in Moneygall in County Offaly, between Dublin and Limerick. It has a visitor centre that provides information on Obama's connections to Moneygall, the birthplace of his great-great-great-grandfather.
- President Barack Obama Main Library – St. Petersburg, Florida renamed its main library in 2018.
- Michelle and Barack Obama Sports Complex - a sports complex in Los Angeles on Obama Boulevard
- Barack Obama Presidential Center – a museum and library in Chicago

== Holidays ==
- Barack Obama Day – state holiday celebrated in Illinois

== Arts and culture ==
=== Art pieces ===
- President Barack Obama
- Barack Obama "Hope" poster
- Barack Obama "Joker" poster

=== Films ===
- 2016: Obama's America
- Obama: In Pursuit of a More Perfect Union
- Obama Anak Menteng
- Obama Mama

=== Music ===
- Barack Obama vs. Mitt Romney
- Crush on Obama
- There's No One as Irish as Barack O'Bama

=== Literature ===
- Barack the Barbarian
- The Obama Identity

== Proposed renamings ==
- Pembroke Park Road – Hollywood, Florida – portion of (or all of) road proposed to be renamed Barack Obama Boulevard
- Midway International Airport – Chicago, Illinois – In 2015, then-Chicago Mayor Rahm Emanuel proposed renaming the airport after Obama in 2015.
- I-57 – Illinois – U.S. Congressman Bobby Rush introduced the Barack Obama Highway Act in 2019 to rename the entire portion of I-57 in Illinois as Barack Obama Highway.
- Barack Obama Boulevard – Milpitas, California – Milpitas City Council approved the renaming of a section of Dixon Landing Road to Barack Obama Boulevard but later shelved the plan.

== See also ==
- List of topics related to Barack Obama
- List of educational institutions named after presidents of the United States
- Presidential memorials in the United States
