= List of educational institutions named after presidents of the United States =

This is a list of educational institutions named after U.S. presidents. Institutions are listed under their respective president's name; presidents are listed alphabetically.

== Adams ==
- Schools are named for John Adams and John Quincy Adams, see Adams High School
- Adams House (Harvard University)
- John Adams Middle School (Kanawha County Schools, Charleston, West Virginia)
- John Adams Middle School (Rochester, Minnesota)
- John Adams Middle School (Edison, New Jersey).
- Adams Elementary School (Davenport, Iowa)

== Biden ==
- Biden School of Public Policy and Administration at the University of Delaware (was the former vice president at opening)

== Buchanan ==
- A public high school and middle school are named for James Buchanan in Mercersburg, Pennsylvania

== G. H. W. Bush ==
- George Herbert Walker Bush Elementary School in Addison, Texas
- George Bush High School in Richmond, Texas
- Bush School of Government and Public Service at Texas A&M University in College Station, Texas

== G. W. Bush ==
- George W. Bush Elementary School in St. Paul, Texas
- George W. Bush Elementary School in Stockton, California

== Carter ==
- The Carter Center in Atlanta, Georgia, is an educational institution, among other things.
- Jimmy Carter Early College High School, La Joya, Texas
- Jimmy Carter Middle School, Albuquerque, New Mexico
- Jimmy and Rosalynn Carter School for Peace and Conflict Resolution, George Mason University
- Jimmy and Rosalynn Carter School of Public Policy, Georgia Institute of Technology

== Cleveland ==
- Cleveland High School (Portland, Oregon)
- Cleveland Elementary School (Cedar Rapids, Iowa)

== Clinton ==
- Clinton School of Public Service of the University of Arkansas
- William Jefferson Clinton Elementary School, Paramount, California
- William Jefferson Clinton Middle School, Historic South Central Los Angeles
- William J. Clinton Elementary School, La Joya, Texas
- William Jefferson Clinton Primary School, Hope, Arkansas

== Coolidge ==
- New England Law Boston, initially named Calvin Coolidge Law School
- Coolidge Senior High School (Washington, D.C.)
- Coolidge High School, Coolidge, Arizona
- Coolidge Middle School (disambiguation)

== Eisenhower ==
- Eisenhower College, Seneca Falls, New York, closed in 1982
- The Eisenhower Institute, part of Gettysburg College, Gettysburg, Pennsylvania
- Eisenhower High School, Utica, Michigan
- Eisenhower High School (Blue Island, Illinois)
- Eisenhower Middle School (disambiguation)
- Nova Dwight D. Eisenhower Elementary School, Davie, Florida
- Eisenhower Elementary School, Independence, Kansas
- Dwight D. Eisenhower Elementary School, Crown Point, Indiana
- Dwight D Eisenhower Eisenhower Elementary School, Santa Clara, California
- Dwight D Eisenhower High School, Houston, Texas

== Fillmore ==
- Millard Fillmore College (permanently closed)

== Ford ==
- Gerald R. Ford School of Public Policy, part of the University of Michigan, Ann Arbor, Michigan

== Garfield ==
- Garfield High School (disambiguation)

== Grant ==
- Grant High School (Portland, Oregon)
- Grant Community School, Salem, Oregon
- U.S. Grant High School (Oklahoma)
- U.S. Grant Middle School, Springfield, Illinois

== Harding ==
- Marion Harding High School, Marion, Ohio
- Warren Harding High School, Bridgeport, Connecticut
- Warren G. Harding High School, Warren, Ohio
- Warren G. Harding Middle School, Philadelphia, Pennsylvania
- Harding Senior High School, Saint Paul, Minnesota

== B. Harrison ==
- Benjamin Harrison Elementary School, Marion, Ohio

== W. Harrison ==
- William Henry Harrison High School (Evansville, Indiana)
- William Henry Harrison High School (Tippecano, Indiana)
- William Henry Harrison High School (Ohio), Harrison, Ohio

== Hayes ==
- Hayes Middle School (Saint Albans, West Virginia)
- Rutherford B. Hayes High School (Delaware, Ohio)

== Hoover ==
- Herbert Hoover High School (disambiguation)
- Herbert Hoover Senior High School, San Diego, California
- Herbert Hoover Junior High School, San Francisco, California
- Herbert Hoover Middle School, Potomac, Maryland
- Herbert Hoover Middle School, Edison, New Jersey
- Hoover Math And Science Academy, Schaumburg, Illinois
- Hoover Middle School, Waterloo, Iowa
- Hoover Elementary, Medford, Oregon
- Hoover Elementary, Salem, Oregon
- Herbert Hoover Elementary, Langhorne, Pennsylvania
- Herbert Hoover Elementary, Council Bluffs, Iowa
- Hoover Institution, a public policy think tank and research institution formally a part of Stanford University

== Jackson ==
- Jackson Middle School, Portland, Oregon
- Jackson Elementary, Medford, Oregon
- Andrew Jackson Elementary, Nashville, Tennessee
- Jackson High School (disambiguation)
- Andrew Jackson Fundamental Magnet High School, St. Bernard Parish, Louisiana, later Andrew Jackson Elementary School, now Andrew Jackson Middle School
- Andrew Jackson Middle School (Kanawha County Schools), Cross Lanes, West Virginia

== Jefferson ==
- Jefferson College (disambiguation)
- Jefferson Community College (disambiguation)
- Jefferson Elementary School (disambiguation)
- Jefferson School (disambiguation)
- Thomas Jefferson Junior High School (disambiguation)
- Thomas Jefferson Junior High School (disambiguation)
- Thomas Jefferson Middle School, Edison, New Jersey
- Thomas Jefferson School of Law
- Thomas Jefferson University

== A. Johnson ==
- Andrew Johnson Elementary School, Kingsport City Schools, Kingsport, Tennessee
- Pre-K Center in Johnson, Oklahoma City

== L. Johnson ==
- Lyndon B. Johnson School of Public Affairs of the University of Texas at Austin
- Lyndon B. Johnson High School (Austin, Texas)
- Lyndon B. Johnson High School, Johnson City, Texas
- Lyndon B. Johnson High School, Laredo, Texas
- Lyndon B. Johnson Middle School, Albuquerque, New Mexico
- Lyndon B. Johnson Middle School, Johnson City, Texas
- Lyndon B. Johnson Middle School, Pharr, Texas
- Lyndon B. Johnson Elementary School, Johnson City, Texas
- Lyndon B. Johnson School, [{Barranquilla, Colombia}]

== Kennedy ==
- John F. Kennedy School of Government of Harvard University
- John F. Kennedy University
- John F. Kennedy College, Wahoo, Nebraska
- John F. Kennedy High School (disambiguation)
- President Kennedy School, a coeducational secondary school and sixth form with academy status in Coventry, England
- Kennedy Middle School (disambiguation)
- John F. Kennedy Elementary School, Keizer, Oregon
- Kennedy Elementary, Medford, Oregon
- John F. Kennedy Special Warfare Center and School, Fort Bragg, North Carolina
- John F. Kennedy Middle School, Cupertino, California
- John F Kennedy Elementary School, Penitas, Texas
- John F. Kennedy Catholic School, Davenport, Iowa

== Lincoln ==
- Lincoln University (California), a private university in Oakland
- Lincoln University (Missouri), a public, historically black, land-grant university in Jefferson City
- Lincoln University (Pennsylvania), a public, historically black university near Oxford
- Lincoln Memorial University, a private university in Harrogate, Tennessee
- Lincoln University College, Malaysia
- Lincoln College (Illinois), a private college in Lincoln
- Lincoln Land Community College, a public community college in Springfield, Illinois
- Abraham Lincoln High School (disambiguation)
- Lincoln High School (disambiguation), includes some schools that may not be named after the president
- Lincoln Junior High School, Bentonville, Arkansas
- Lincoln Center Institute, the education division of the Lincoln Center for the Performing Arts
- Lincoln Law School of Sacramento, a private, for-profit law school
- Lincoln Law School of San Jose, a private, non-profit law school
- Lincoln School (disambiguation)
- Lincoln Elementary School (disambiguation)
- Lincoln Elementary School, Edison, New Jersey
- Lincoln elementary school in Winchester Massachusetts

== Madison ==
- James Madison Intermediate, Edison, New Jersey
- James Madison Primary, Edison, New Jersey
- James Madison University, Harrisonburg, Virginia
- James Madison College of Michigan State University
- James Madison High School (disambiguation)
- James Madison Middle School
- Madison High School (disambiguation)
- Madison County High School (disambiguation)
- Madison Elementary School, Davenport, Iowa

== McKinley ==
- McKinley High School (disambiguation)
- McKinley High School (Sebring, Ohio)
- McKinley Middle School (Saint Albans, West Virginia)
- William McKinley Elementary School Salem, Oregon
- McKinley Elementary School (San Diego, California)

== Monroe ==
- Monroe University, a private, for-profit college in New York City
- James Monroe High School (disambiguation)

== Nixon ==
- Richard M. Nixon Elementary School, Hiawatha, Iowa
- Nixon Elementary School, Landing, New Jersey

== Obama ==
- Barack & Michelle Obama Elementary School, St Paul, Minnesota
- Barack & Michelle Obama Academy, Atlanta, Georgia
- Barack H. Obama Magnet Elementary, Jackson, Mississippi
- Barack Obama School, Pine Lawn, Missouri
- Barack Obama Global Preparation Academy, Los Angeles, California
- Barack Obama Leadership Academy, Detroit, Michigan
- Barack Obama School of Leadership and STEM, Chicago Heights, Illinois
- Barack Obama School, Maple Heights, Ohio
- Barack Obama School of Career and Technical Education, Milwaukee, Wisconsin
- Barack Obama Learning Academy, Hazel Crest, Illinois
- Barack and Michelle Obama 9th Grade Campus, Lancaster, Texas
- Barack Obama Green Charter High School, Plainfield, New Jersey
- Barack Obama Charter Elementary School, Willowbrook, California
- Barack Obama Elementary School, Hempstead, New York
- Barack Obama Elementary School, Richmond, Virginia
- President Barack Obama School - Public School 34, Jersey City, New Jersey
- Barack Obama Elementary School, Upper Marlboro, Maryland
- Barack Obama Academy of International Studies 6–12, Pittsburgh, Pennsylvania
- Barack Obama Male Leadership Academy, Dallas, Texas.
- Barack H. Obama Magnet University School, New Haven, Connecticut.
- Barack H. Obama Elementary Magnet School of Science and Technology, DeKalb County School District, Atlanta, Georgia

== Pierce ==
- Franklin Pierce University, a private university in Rindge, New Hampshire
- University of New Hampshire School of Law (formerly Franklin Pierce Law Center)
- Franklin Pierce High School, Tacoma, Washington

== Polk ==
- Polk Middle School, Albuquerque, New Mexico
- Polk Elementary School, Fresno, California
- Polk Elementary School, Dearborn Heights, Michigan

== Reagan ==
- Ronald Reagan High School (disambiguation)
- Ronald Wilson Reagan Middle School, Haymarket, Virginia
- Ronald W. Reagan High School, Pfafftown, North Carolina
- Ronald Reagan Elementary, Omaha (Millard), Nebraska
- Reagan Elementary, Cedar Park, Texas
- Ronald W. Reagan Middle School, Grand Prairie, Texas
- Ronald Reagan Elementary School, Eastvale, California

== T. & F. Roosevelt ==
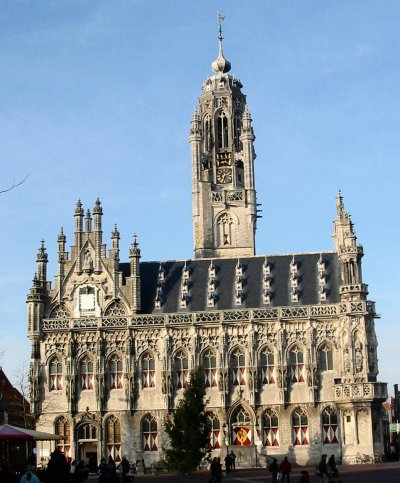
University College Roosevelt city hall

- University College Roosevelt, Middelburg, Zeeland
- Roosevelt Institution
- Roosevelt International Middle School, San Diego, California
- Roosevelt University
- Roosevelt Elementary, Medford, Oregon
- Numerous Roosevelt High Schools in the United States are listed under this wikilink. The list includes high schools named for Theodore Roosevelt, Franklin D. Roosevelt, and Eleanor Roosevelt.

== Taft ==
- William Howard Taft University
- William Howard Taft High School (disambiguation)
- Taft Elementary School, Lincoln City, Oregon
- Taft 7-12 School, Lincoln City, Oregon

== Truman ==
- Harry S Truman School of Public Affairs at the University of Missouri
- Truman State University
- Harry S Truman College
- Truman High School (disambiguation)

== Trump ==
- Trump University (Defunct, founded prior to Trump's entry into national politics)
- An attempt to rename Conover Road Primary School in Colts Neck as 'Donald J. Trump Primary School' failed in March 2026.

== Tyler ==
- Tyler High School, named John Tyler High School from 1958 to 2020
- Brightpoint Community College, formerly John Tyler Community College

== Van Buren ==
- Martin Van Buren High School

== Washington ==
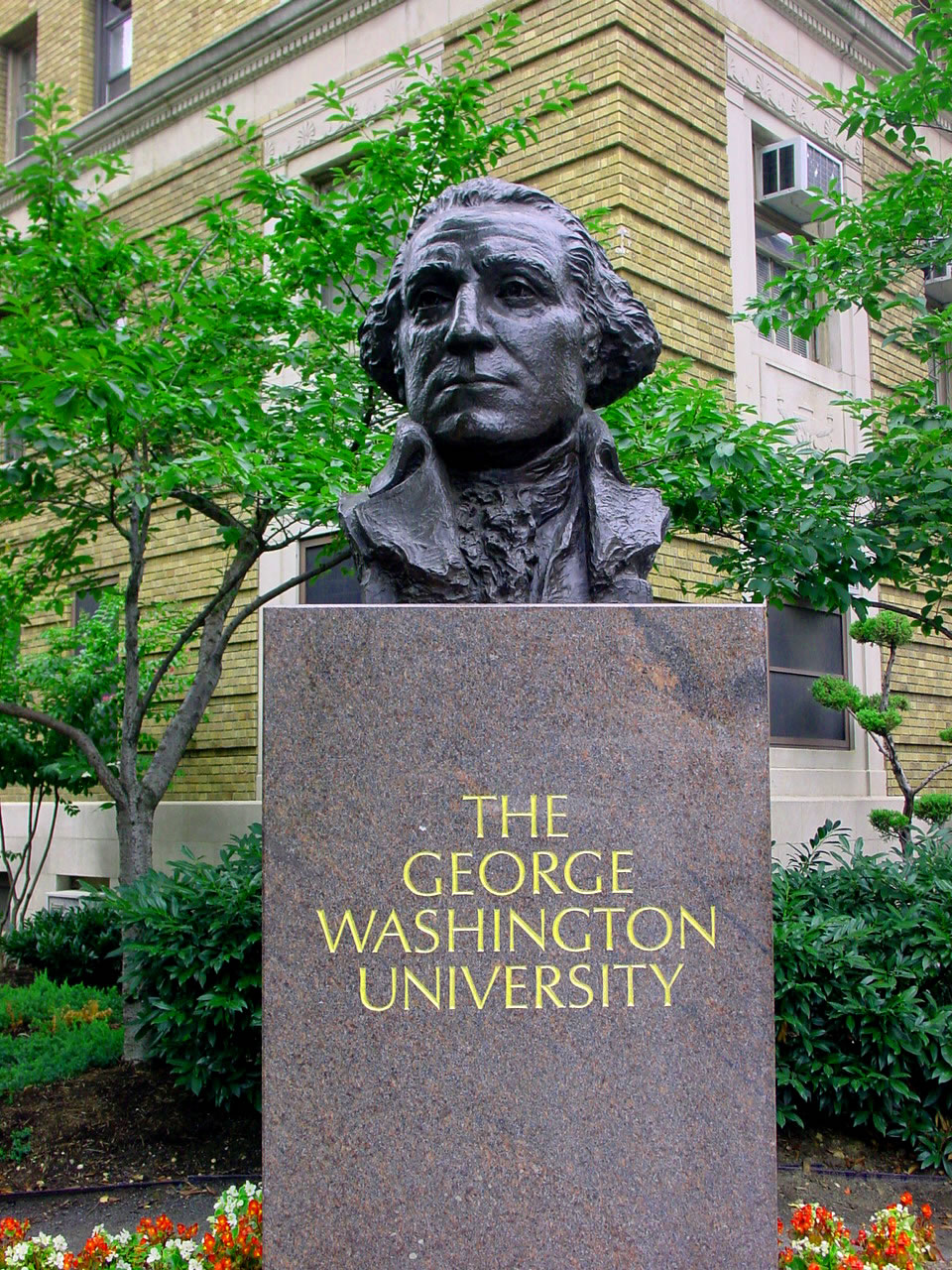
A bust of George Washington on the campus of George Washington University

- Washington University in St. Louis, Missouri
- George Washington University, Washington, D.C.
- Washington and Lee University, Lexington, Virginia
- Washington College, Chestertown, Maryland
- Washington & Jefferson College, Washington, Pennsylvania
- George Washington High School (disambiguation)
- Washington and Lee High School, Montross, Virginia
- Washington Junior High School, Bentonville, Arkansas
- George Washington Elementary School, Salem, Oregon
- Washington Elementary, in Medford, Oregon
- Washington Elementary, in Norman, Oklahoma

== Wilson ==
- Wilson Elementary, Medford, Oregon
- Woodrow Wilson Elementary School, Manhattan, Kansas
- Woodrow Wilson High School (disambiguation)
- Woodrow Wilson International Center for Scholars
- First College, Princeton University, formerly Wilson College
- Princeton School of Public and International Affairs, formerly the Woodrow Wilson School of Public and International Affairs

== See also ==
- Presidential memorials in the United States
