= List of memorials to Thomas Jefferson =

Many memorials have been established to Thomas Jefferson, Founding Father, third president of the United States, and the author of the United States Declaration of Independence.

== Buildings ==
=== Elementary schools ===
- Jefferson Elementary School, in Cammack Village, Arkansas
- Thomas Jefferson Elementary, Anaheim, California
- Thomas Jefferson Elementary, Burbank, California
- Jefferson Elementary School (Corona, California), part of Corona-Norco Unified School District
- Thomas Jefferson Elementary, Glendale, California
- Jefferson Elementary School (Redondo Beach, California)
- Thomas Jefferson School (Sacramento, California), a historic school building
- Jefferson Elementary School (Santa Ana, California)
- Thomas Jefferson Elementary School, Honolulu, Hawaii
- Thomas Jefferson Elementary, Chicago, Illinois
- Jefferson Elementary School (Vandalia, Illinois)
- Jefferson Elementary School (Washington, Indiana)
- Jefferson Elementary School (Creston, Iowa)
- Jefferson School (Massachusetts), a historic school building in Weymouth, Massachusetts
- Thomas Jefferson, Baltimore, Maryland
- Jefferson-Barnes Elementary, Westland, Michigan (closed)
- Jefferson Elementary School (Winona, Minnesota)
- Jefferson School (Cape Girardeau, Missouri), a historic school building
- Jefferson Elementary School (Westfield, New Jersey)
- Jefferson Elementary, Huntington, New York
- Thomas Jefferson, Morristown, New Jersey
- Jefferson School, Union City, New Jersey
- Jefferson Elementary School, Hobbs, New Mexico
- Thomas Jefferson Elementary School (Eastlake, Ohio), part of Willoughby-Eastlake Schools
- Jefferson Schoolhouse, a historic building in Indian Hill, Ohio
- Jefferson Elementary School (Pottstown, Pennsylvania)
- Jefferson School (Clifton Forge, Virginia), a historic school building
- Thomas Jefferson Elementary School (Falls Church, Virginia), part of Falls Church City Public Schools
- Jefferson Elementary School (Spokane, Washington)
- Jefferson Elementary School (Tacoma, Washington), part of Tacoma Public Schools
- Jefferson Elementary School, in Appleton, Wisconsin
- President Thomas Jefferson Elementary School (Waikiki, Honolulu, Hawaii)
- Thomas Jefferson Elementary School (Kingsport, TN)

=== High schools ===
- Jefferson County High School (Arkansas), in Pine Bluff, Arkansas, later known as Coleman High School
- Jefferson High School (Daly City, California)
- Jefferson High School (Los Angeles), California
- Jefferson High School (Mt. Shasta, California)
- Bellarmine-Jefferson High School, in Burbank, California
- Thomas Jefferson High School (Denver), Colorado
- Jefferson High School (Edgewater, Colorado)
- Thomas Jefferson High School (Tampa, Florida)
- Jefferson County High School (Florida), in Jefferson County, Florida
- Jefferson County High School (Georgia), in Louisville, Georgia
- Thomas Jefferson Academy (Georgia)
- Thomas Jefferson High School (Rockford, Illinois)
- Jefferson High School (Indiana)
- Jefferson High School (Cedar Rapids, Iowa)
- Thomas Jefferson High School (Council Bluffs, Iowa)
- Jefferson County High School (Kentucky), in Jefferson County, Kentucky
- Thomas Jefferson High School (Gretna, Louisiana)
- East Jefferson High School, in Metairie, Louisiana
- West Jefferson High School (Louisiana), in Harvey, Louisiana
- Jefferson Schools, a public school district in Frenchtown Charter Township, Michigan
- Jefferson High School (Alexandria, Minnesota), now Alexandria Area High School
- Jefferson High School (Bloomington, Minnesota)
- Jefferson County High School (Mississippi), in Jefferson County, Mississippi
- Jefferson High School (Missouri), in Conception Junction, Missouri
- Thomas Jefferson School (St. Louis, Missouri), a coeducational boarding and day school
- Jefferson High School (Montana)
- Thomas Jefferson High School (New Jersey)
- Jefferson Township High School (New Jersey), in Oak Ridge, New Jersey
- Thomas Jefferson Arts Academy, a public high school in Elizabeth, New Jersey
- Thomas Jefferson High School (Brooklyn), New York
- Thomas Jefferson High School (Rochester, New York)
- Thomas Jefferson Academy (North Carolina)
- Jefferson High School (Delphos, Ohio)
- Jefferson Township High School (Ohio), in Dayton, Ohio
- Jefferson Area High School (Jefferson, Ohio)
- Jefferson High School (Portland, Oregon)
- Jefferson High School (Jefferson, Oregon)
- Thomas Jefferson High School (Jefferson Hills, Pennsylvania)
- Thomas Jefferson School (Philadelphia, Pennsylvania), listed on the National Register of Historic Places, now Bodine High School for International Affairs
- Thomas Jefferson High School (South Dakota)
- Jefferson County High School (Tennessee), in Jefferson County, Tennessee
- Thomas Jefferson High School (Dallas), Texas
- Jefferson High School (El Paso, Texas)
- Jefferson High School (Jefferson, Texas)
- Thomas Jefferson High School (Port Arthur, Texas)
- Thomas Jefferson High School (San Antonio), Texas
- Jefferson High School in Sioux Falls, South Dakota
- Thomas Jefferson High School (1964–1987), in Fairfax County, Virginia (near Alexandria)
- Thomas Jefferson High School for Science and Technology, in Fairfax County, Virginia (near Alexandria)
- Jefferson School (Charlottesville, Virginia), a historic school building
- Thomas Jefferson High School (Richmond, Virginia)
- Thomas Jefferson High School (Auburn, Washington)
- Jefferson High School (Shenandoah Junction, West Virginia)
- Jefferson High School (Jefferson, Wisconsin), whose old building is listed on the National Register of Historic Places
- Second English Language High School "Thomas Jefferson", Sofia, Bulgaria

==== In fiction ====
- Jefferson High School, in Happy Days

=== Universities and colleges ===
- Jefferson State Community College, Birmingham, Alabama
- Thomas Jefferson School of Law, San Diego, California
- Jefferson Community and Technical College, Louisville, Kentucky
- Jefferson College (Louisiana), a former college in Convent, Louisiana
- Jefferson College (Mississippi), Washington, Mississippi
- Jefferson College (Missouri), Hillsboro, Missouri
- Jefferson Community College (Watertown, New York)
- Washington & Jefferson College, Washington, Pennsylvania
- Thomas Jefferson University, Philadelphia, Pennsylvania
- Jefferson College of Health Sciences, Roanoke, Virginia

=== Other schools ===
- Instituto Thomas Jefferson, a private K-12 school located in Tlalnepantla de Baz, Mexico
- Jefferson High School Online, a diploma mill
- Jefferson School of Social Science (1944-1956), a New York City adult education and training facility of the Communist Party USA
- Thomas Jefferson Charter School, Caldwell, Idaho

=== Other buildings ===
- Jefferson Hotel in Richmond, Virginia
- Jefferson Hotel in Washington, D.C.
- Jefferson Memorial
- Thomas Jefferson Building, Library of Congress, Washington, D.C.
- Thomas Jefferson Library, University of Missouri-St.Louis
- Thomas Jefferson National Accelerator Facility, Newport News, Virginia
- Thomas Jefferson State Office Building, Jefferson City, Missouri

== Cities, towns and villages ==
- Jefferson, Georgia
- Jefferson, Maine
- Jefferson, New Hampshire, first municipality named for Jefferson
- Jefferson, Ohio
- Jefferson, Oregon
- Jefferson, South Dakota
- Jefferson, Texas
- Jefferson, Wisconsin
- Jefferson City, Missouri, state capital
- Jefferson City, Tennessee
- Jefferson Hills, Pennsylvania
- Jefferson Township, New Jersey
- Jeffersontown, Kentucky
- Port Jefferson, New York
- Jefferson, York County, Pennsylvania

== Counties ==
- Jefferson County, Alabama
- Jefferson County, Arkansas
- Jefferson County, Colorado
- Jefferson County, Florida
- Jefferson County, Georgia
- Jefferson County, Iowa
- Jefferson County, Indiana
- Jefferson County, Kentucky
- Jefferson County, Missouri
- Jefferson County, Montana
- Jefferson County, New York
- Jefferson County, Ohio
- Jefferson County, Oklahoma
- Jefferson County, Pennsylvania
- Jefferson County, Tennessee
- Jefferson County, Texas
- Jefferson County, Washington
- Jefferson County, West Virginia
- Jefferson Parish, Louisiana

It is notable that Jefferson County in Virginia became part of West Virginia as a result of the American Civil War. Virginia sued West Virginia to regain it, but lost the case before the United States Supreme Court when it was decided in 1871.

== Mountains ==
- Mountain peaks named after Jefferson
- Jefferson Rock, West Virginia

== Parks ==
- Jefferson Park (Chicago), a historic park listed on the National Register of Historic Places in the Chicago community area of the same name
- Gateway Arch National Park in St. Louis, Missouri, was named Jefferson National Expansion Memorial from 1935 until 2018
- Jefferson School Park, Hobbs, New Mexico
- Thomas Jefferson Park, in New York City
- Jefferson Pools, the oldest US spa buildings, where President Jefferson bathed, in Warm Springs, Virginia

== Streets ==
- Jefferson Highway, running from New Orleans to Winnipeg
- Jefferson Road, Metro Detroit, Michigan
- Jefferson Blvd. Los Angeles, California
- Jefferson Drive on the National Mall, Washington, DC
- Jefferson Street, Miami Beach, Florida
- Jefferson Ave. Newport News, Virginia
- Thomas Jefferson Parkway. Charlottesville, Virginia
- Jefferson Avenue, Winnipeg, Manitoba
- Jefferson Blvd. Fort Wayne, Indiana
- Jefferson Avenue, Buffalo, New York
- Jefferson Street, Phoenix, Arizona

== Other ==
- Jefferson (South state), a 1915 proposed state
- Jefferson (Pacific state), a 1941 proposed state
- Jefferson Health, a regional health system headquartered at Thomas Jefferson University Hospital in Philadelphia
- Jefferson Schools, a school district in Frenchtown Charter Township, Michigan
- Jefferson Territory
- Jefferson Park, Chicago, one of Chicago's 77 community areas on the city's Northwest Side
- Memorial to the 56 Signers of the Declaration of Independence
- Minor planet 30928 Jefferson is named in his honor

== See also ==
- Jefferson (disambiguation)
- Presidential memorials in the United States
