= Jefferson Elementary School =

Jefferson Elementary School

== United States schools by state ==
- Jefferson Elementary School (Little Rock, Arkansas), in Cammack Village, Arkansas
- Jefferson Elementary School (Berkeley, California), designed by Henry Higby Gutterson
- Jefferson Elementary School (Corona, California), part of Corona-Norco Unified School District
- Jefferson Elementary School (Redondo Beach, California)
- Jefferson Elementary School (Santa Ana, California)
- Jefferson Elementary School (Ottawa, Illinois)
- Jefferson Elementary School (Vandalia, Illinois)
- Jefferson Elementary School (Washington, Indiana)
- Jefferson Elementary School (Creston, Iowa)
- Jefferson Elementary School (Muscatine, Iowa)
- Jefferson Elementary School (Winona, Minnesota)
- Jefferson Elementary School (Westfield, New Jersey)
- Jefferson Elementary School (Hobbs, New Mexico)
- Jefferson Elementary School (Pottstown, Pennsylvania)
- Jefferson Elementary School (Spokane, Washington)
- Jefferson Elementary School (Tacoma, Washington), part of Tacoma Public Schools
- President Thomas Jefferson Elementary School (Waikiki, Honolulu, Hawaii)

== See also ==
- List of schools named after Thomas Jefferson
