= JMHS =

JMHS may refer to:

- John Masefield High School, Ledbury, Herefordshire, United Kingdom
- Jackson Memorial High School, Jackson, New Jersey, United States
- James Madison High School (disambiguation)
- James Meehan High School, Macquarie Fields, New South Wales, Australia
- James Monroe High School (disambiguation)
- John Maland High School, Devon, Alberta, Canada
- John Marshall High School (disambiguation)
- John Muir High School (Pasadena, California), United States
- Jordan-Matthews High School, Siler City, North Carolina, United States
