= Chandalae Lanouette =

American dancer and choreographer

- Education: Ronald W. Reagan High School
- Occupation: Entertainment Manager for the Carolina Panthers
- Years active: 2014 – present
- Career
- Former groups: Carolina Topcats

Chandalae Lanouette is an American dancer, choreographer, and entertainment manager. She served as the entertainment manager for the Carolina Panthers, coaching the Carolina Topcats cheerleading squad until 2025. She was previously a Topcat from 2014 to 2018 and was selected to dance in the 2018 NFL Pro Bowl.

== Early life and education ==
Lanouette is from Pfafftown, North Carolina, and attended Ronald W. Reagan High School.

== Career ==
Lanouette danced in the NFL as a member of the Carolina Topcats from the 2014 season to the 2018 Carolina Panthers season. As part of the team, she travelled to Ramstein Air Base in Germany to perform and boost morale for service members of the U.S. military. In 2018, she was selected to represent the Topcats at the 2018 NFL Pro Bowl.

After retiring from dancing in the NFL, Lanouette was hired as the director of the Carolina Topcats and entertainment manager of the Carolina Panthers. She has focused on diversity in dancers and in community outreach. In 2021, she hired the first three male cheerleaders on the Topcats, Tre' Booker, Melvin Sutton, and Chris Crawford, two of whom were also the first openly gay cheerleaders on the team. Lanouette also hired Justine Lindsay in 2022 as the first openly transgender cheerleader in the NFL. Lanouette led members of the squad in volunteering for the Mecklenburg Humane Society, Black Lives Matter, Transcend Charlotte, and the American Cancer Society. In 2024, she partnered with historically black colleges and universities to develop a talent pipeline into NFL cheerleading.
