= Jefferson School =

Jefferson School may refer to:

- Jefferson School (Massachusetts), a historic school building in Weymouth, Massachusetts
- Jefferson Schools, a school district in Frenchtown Charter Township, Michigan
- Jefferson School (Cape Girardeau, Missouri), a historic school building
- Jefferson School of Social Science (1944-1956), a New York City adult education and training facility of the Communist Party USA
- Jefferson Schoolhouse, Indian Hill, Ohio
- Jefferson School (Clifton Forge, Virginia), a historic school building
- Jefferson School (Charlottesville, Virginia), a historic school building

== See also ==
- Jefferson Elementary School (disambiguation)
- List of schools named after Thomas Jefferson
