= Justine Lindsay =

American dancer (born 1992)

Justine Simone Lindsay
- Born: 1992 (age 33–34); North Carolina, U.S.
- Education: Art Institute of Charlotte; Johnson C. Smith University; North Carolina State University
- Occupations: Dancer, cheerleader, podcaster
- Known for: NFL cheerleader
- Career
- Former groups: Carolina TopCats

Justine Simone Lindsay (born 1992) is an American dancer, professional cheerleader, and podcaster. She was a member of the Carolina TopCats cheerleading team associated with the Carolina Panthers from 2022 to 2024. Lindsay was the first openly transgender cheerleader in the National Football League.

== Education ==
Lindsay attended Johnson C. Smith University, where she was a member of the Golden Bullettes dance team, and graduated with a bachelor's degree in communications from North Carolina State University. She also earned an associate degree from the Art Institute of Charlotte. In 2012, while an undergraduate student, Lindsay performed in a halftime show with the St. Augustine's University marching band.

== Career ==
In March 2022, Lindsay became the first openly transgender person to make a National Football League Cheerleading team when she was hired by Chandalae Lanouette to join the Carolina TopCats. While there is no official record of the history of the National Football League's cheerleading rosters, and therefore it is possible that other transgender women could have been on teams before, Lindsay is the first transgender woman on a team to be open about her identity. After making the team, Lindsay revealed she was transgender via a post on her Instagram. In June 2022, the news that Lindsay was the first transgender cheerleader in the National Football League became public after an article was posted about her on BuzzFeed. BuzzFeed had found her post about making the Carolina TopCats, and coming out as a transgender woman, on Instagram. She also was selected with a bald head, and stated that she hoped to inspire other young people who might feel insecure about their bald look and break down barriers about gender and appearance, stating:

I'm happy because I was able to break down that door and tell people, "Hey, we are not just sexual beings ... We are actual human beings who want to better ourselves." I felt like, Why not tell the world: "Hey, listen, this is a great accomplishment."

After facing some backlash due to Lindsay's hiring, the Panthers made the following official statement to the National Public Radio: "Members of the TopCats are hired based on their qualifications and abilities. Our organization is an equal opportunity employer and does not discriminate because of age, race, religion, color, disability, sex, sexual orientation, or national origin. We wish all the TopCats, including Justine Lindsay, an incredible season."

In November 2025, Lindsay stated that she was cut from the TopCats for being trans, shortly after the re-election of Donald Trump.

== See also ==
- Tre' Booker
- Chris Crawford (dancer)
- Melvin Sutton
