= Phillip Riggs =

American educator

Phillip Riggs is an American educator and the recipient of the 2016 Grammy Award for Music Educator. He is also a 2015 inductee into the Ronald W. Reagan High School Hall of Fame. Riggs received a Bachelor of Music in music education from Appalachian State University in 1988, and a Master of Education from the University of North Carolina at Greensboro. He taught music education at the North Carolina School of Science and Mathematics for 30 years before retiring in 2019. He was inducted into the Rhododendron Society at Appalachian State, an honor given to alumni for their exemplary service to education and to their communities.
