= Vernon Malone =

American politician from North Carolina

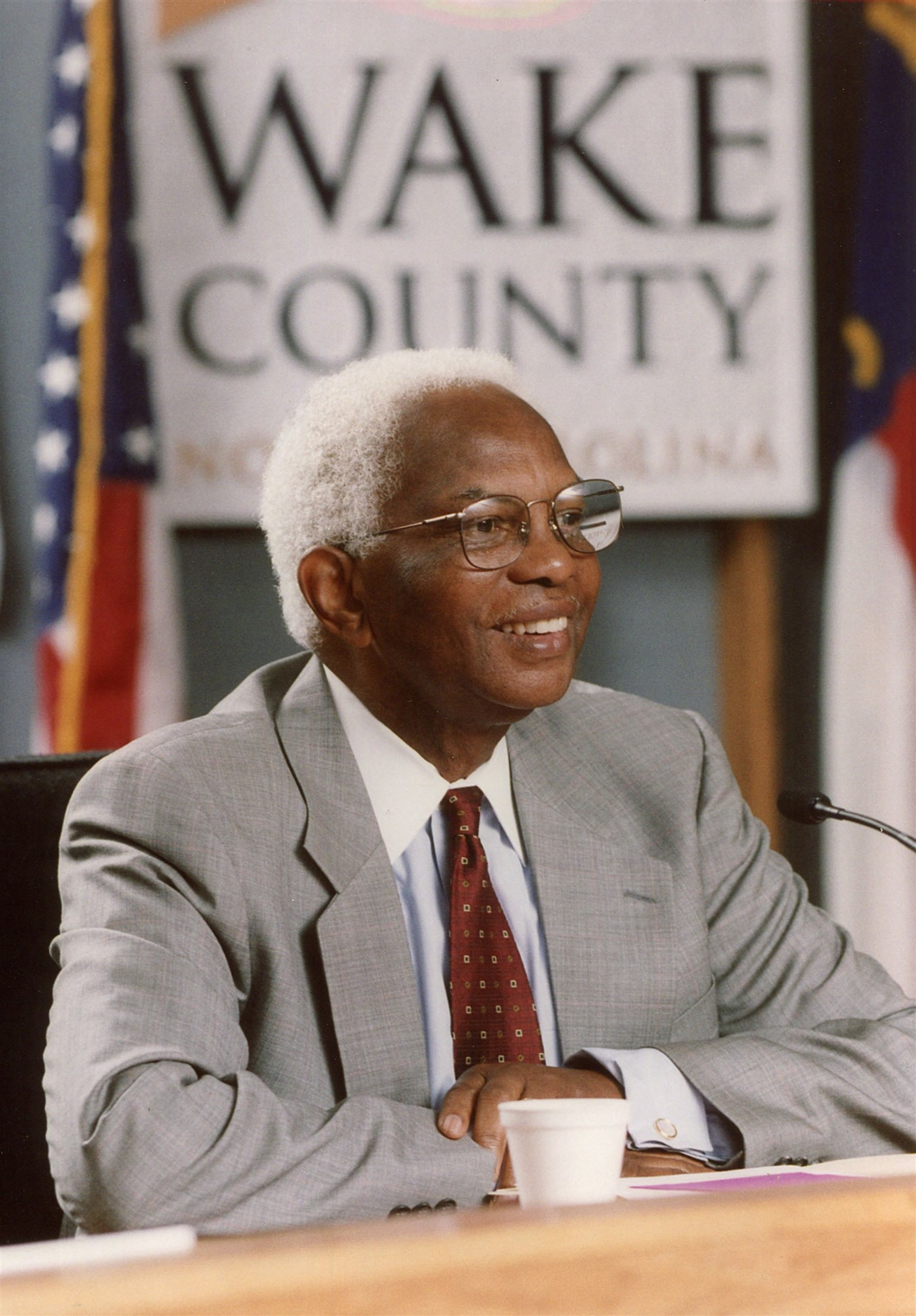

Member of the North Carolina Senate from the 14th district
- In office January 1, 2003 – April 18, 2009
- Preceded by: Constituency established
- Succeeded by: Dan Blue

Member of the Wake County Board of Commissioners
- In office 1980–2002

Personal details
- Born: December 20, 1931 Wake Forest, North Carolina, U.S.
- Died: April 18, 2009 (aged 77) Raleigh, North Carolina, U.S.
- Party: Democratic
- Spouse: Susan
- Education: Shaw University
- Occupation: School Administrator

Vernon Malone (December 20, 1931 – April 18, 2009) was an American politician. A Democrat, he served was a member of the North Carolina General Assembly representing the state's fourteenth Senate district from 2003 until his death in 2009. His district included constituents in Wake County. A retired teacher and educational administrator from Raleigh, Malone was a graduate of Shaw University and held public offices in Wake County for over three decades.

Malone was born in Wake Forest on December 20, 1931.

As school board chairman, he presided over the merger of Raleigh city schools and Wake County Public Schools in 1976. He served as a Wake County commissioner from 1980 until his election to the Senate in 2002.

In the Senate, Malone continued to work in education. He was co-chairman of the Senate's higher education committee and appropriations committee for higher education.

Outside of public office, Malone worked as a classroom teacher and as a school administrator before becoming superintendent of the Governor Morehead School for the blind in Raleigh.

Malone served as vice-chair of Shaw University's board of trustees, as well as a trustee for North Carolina State University, the North Carolina Museum of Art and Wake Education Partnership. He was also a director of Capital Bank, a community bank headquartered in Raleigh.

He was an alumnus of Alpha Phi Alpha fraternity.

Malone died in his home in Raleigh on April 18, 2009.

The Vernon Malone Career and College Academy, an application-based public school in the Wake County Public School System opened in 2014 and named for the former educator. The school focuses on career and technical education (CTE).

North Carolina Senate
Preceded by Brad Miller; Eric Miller Reeves	Member of the North Carolina Senate from the 14th district 2003-2009	Succeeded by Dan Blue
