= List of Phi Upsilon Omicron chapters =

Phi Upsilon Omicron is a collegiate honor society for student of family and consumer science. It was established in 1909 at the University of Minnesota.

== Collegiate chapters ==
Following are the chapters of Phi Upsilon Omicron, with active chapters in bold and inactive chapters and institutions in italics.

Chapter	Charter date and range	Institution	Location	Status	Ref.
**Alpha**	February 10, 1909	University of Minnesota	Saint Paul, Minnesota	Active	
**Beta**	November 14, 1914	North Dakota State University	Fargo, North Dakota	Active	
**Gamma**	May 22, 1915	Ohio State University	Columbus, Ohio	Active	
**Delta**	November 27, 1915	University of Wyoming	Laramie, Wyoming	Active	
**Epsilon**	May 5, 1917	Montana State University	Bozeman, Montana	Active	
**Zeta**	May 22, 1918	University of Idaho	Moscow, Idaho	Active	
**Eta**	July 3, 1920	Pittsburg State University	Pittsburg, Kansas	Active	
**Theta**	July 30, 1921	Ohio University	Athens, Ohio	Active	
**Iota**	February 26, 1922	University of Kentucky	Lexington, Kentucky	Active	
**Kappa**	March 10, 1923	Utah State University	Logan, Utah	Active	
**Lambda**	November 24, 1923	West Virginia University	Morgantown, West Virginia	Active	
**Mu**	December 22, 1923	Buffalo State University	Buffalo, New York	Active	
**Nu**	May 24, 1925	University of Wisconsin–Madison	Madison, Wisconsin	Active	
Xi	1925	University of Nebraska–Lincoln	Lincoln, Nebraska	Inactive	
**Omicron**	June 5, 1926	Iowa State University	Ames, Iowa	Active	
Pi	1926	University of Illinois Urbana-Champaign	Urbana, Illinois	Inactive	
**Rho**	June 6, 1929	University of Missouri	Columbia, Missouri	Active	
Sigma	1931	Louisiana State University	Baton Rouge, Louisiana	Inactive	
**Tau**	April 29, 1933	University of Wisconsin–Stout	Menomonie, Wisconsin	Active	
**Upsilon**	May 10, 1934	Winthrop University	Rock Hill, South Carolina	Active	
**Phi**	May 19, 1934	South Dakota State University	Brookings, South Dakota	Active	
**Chi**	May 16, 1936	University of Georgia	Athens, Georgia	Active	
**Psi**	December 11, 1936	University of Alabama	Tuscaloosa, Alabama	Active	
**Omega**	November 26, 1937	Texas Tech University	Lubbock, Texas	Active	
**Alpha Alpha**	January 22, 1938	Texas Woman's University	Denton, Texas	Active	
**Alpha Beta**	March 2, 1940	Mississippi University for Women	Columbus, Mississippi	Active	
Alpha Gamma	1941	Wayne State University	Detroit, Michigan	Inactive	
Alpha Delta	1943	University of Arkansas	Fayetteville, Arkansas	Inactive	
Alpha Epsilon	1944	University of North Dakota	Grand Forks, North Dakota	Inactive	
Alpha Zeta	1945	University of New Hampshire	Durham, New Hampshire	Inactive	
Alpha Eta	1946	Georgia College & State University	Milledgeville, Georgia	Inactive	
Alpha Theta	1946–1966	Case Western Reserve University	Cleveland, Ohio	Inactive	
Alpha Iota	1947	University of North Texas	Denton, Texas	Inactive	
Alpha Kappa	1948	Pennsylvania State University	University Park, Pennsylvania	Inactive	
Alpha Lamba	1948	University of Connecticut	Storrs, Connecticut	Inactive	
Alpha Mu	1949–1971	Ohio Wesleyan University	Delaware, Ohio	Inactive	
**Alpha Nu**	February 11, 1950	Oklahoma State University	Stillwater, Oklahoma	Active	
**Alpha Xi**	April 26, 1952	Bowling Green State University	Bowling Green, Ohio	Active	
Alpha Omicron	1952–1968	Regis University	Weston, Massachusetts	Inactive	
Alpha Pi (First)	1955–1962	Hunter College	New York City, New York	Inactive	
Alpha Rho	1955	San Jose State University	San Jose, California	Inactive	
**Alpha Sigma**	1956–19xx?; May 1974	Ball State University	Muncie, Indiana	Active	
Alpha Tau	1960	University of Houston	Houston, Texas	Inactive	
**Alpha Upsilon**	April 30, 1960	Arizona State University	Tempe, Arizona	Active	
**Alpha Phi**	April 30, 1960	Indiana State University	Terre Haute, Indiana	Active	
Alpha Chi	1960	Kansas State University	Manhattan, Kansas	Inactive	
Alpha Psi	1962	University of Iowa	San Jose, California	Inactive	
**Alpha Omega**	February 15, 1964	Miami University	Oxford, Ohio	Active	
**Beta Alpha**	February 21, 1965	University of Hawaiʻi at Mānoa	Honolulu, Hawaii	Active	
Beta Beta	1965	California Polytechnic State University, San Luis Obispo	San Luis Obispo, California	Inactive	
**Beta Gamma**	January 22, 1966	Minnesota State University, Mankato	Mankato, Minnesota	Active	
**Beta Delta**	May 14, 1966	Western Kentucky University	Bowling Green, Kentucky	Active	
**Beta Epsilon**	May 13, 1967	State University of New York at Plattsburgh	Plattsburgh, New York	Active	
**Beta Zeta**	February 9, 1968	Texas Christian University	Fort Worth, Texas	Active	
Beta Eta	1968	East Carolina University	Greenville, North Carolina	Inactive	
Beta Theta	1968	California State University, Los Angeles	Los Angeles, California	Inactive	
**Beta Iota**	February 8, 1969	Southern University	Baton Rouge, Louisiana	Active	
Beta Kappa	1969	Northern College	Timmins, Ontario, Canada	Inactive	
**Beta Lambda**	April 20, 1969	Virginia Tech	Blacksburg, Virginia	Active	
Beta Mu	1969	Georgia Southern University	Statesboro, Georgia	Inactive	
Beta Nu	1970	University of Northern Iowa	Cedar Falls, Iowa	Inactive	
**Beta Xi**	November 20, 1970	Texas State University	San Marcos, Texas	Active	
**Beta Omicron**	April 4, 1971	State University of New York at Oneonta	Oneonta, New York	Active	
Beta Pi	1971	Framingham State College	Framingham, Massachusetts	Inactive	
**Beta Rho**	April 15, 1972	Idaho State University	Pocatello, Idaho	Active	
**Beta Sigma**	April 22, 1972	University of Tennessee at Martin	Martin, Tennessee	Active	
**Beta Tau**	March 4, 1973	Eastern Kentucky University	Richmond, Kentucky	Active	
**Beta Upsilon**	April 14, 1973	Stephen F. Austin State University	Nacogdoches, Texas	Active	
Beta Phi	1973	San Diego State University	San Diego, California	Inactive	
**Alpha Pi (Second)**	April 1974	Queens College, City University of New York	Flushing, Queens, New York City, New York	Active	
Beta Chi	1975	California State University, Fresno	Fresno, California	Inactive	
**Beta Psi**	May 16, 1981	California State Polytechnic University, Pomona	Pomona, California	Active	
**Gamma Alpha**	October 9, 1982	University of Wisconsin–Stevens Point	Stevens Point, Wisconsin	Active	
**Gamma Beta**	May 13, 1983	University of Central Arkansas	Conway, Arkansas	Active	
**Gamma Gamma**	May 20, 1984	University of Central Oklahoma	Edmond, Oklahoma	Active	
Gamma Delta		California State University Chico	Chico, California	Inactive	
Gamma Epsilon	March 5, 2000	East Central University	Ada, Oklahoma	Inactive	
Gamma Zeta		Northeastern State University	Tahlequah, Oklahoma	Inactive	
Gamma Eta		Cameron University	Lawton, Oklahoma	Inactive	
Gamma Theta		Zayed University	Abu Dhabi. United Arab Emirates	Inactive	
**Gamma Iota**	November 5, 2004	Point Loma Nazarene University	San Diego, California	Active	
Gamma Kappa	20xx ?	Campbell University	Buies Creek, North Carolina	Inactive	
**Gamma Lambda**	September 16, 2007	University of Maryland, College Park	College Park, Maryland	Active	
**Gamma Nu**	May 17, 2012	Loma Linda University	Loma Linda, California	Active	
**Gamma Mu**	June 1, 2012	Art Institute of Charlotte	Charlotte, North Carolina	Inactive	(Note: College closed in 2018.)
**Gamma Xi**	February 4, 2020	Oklahoma Christian University	Oklahoma City, Oklahoma	Active	
**Gamma Omicron**	December 5, 2020	Morgan State University	Baltimore, Maryland	Active	

== Alumni chapters ==
Following are the active alumni chapters of Phi Upsilon Gamma.

Chapter	Charter date	Location	Status	Ref.
Alpha Alumni		Saint Paul, Minnesota	Active	
Gamma Alumni		Columbus, Ohio	Active	
Iota Alumni		Lexington, Kentucky	Active	
Lambda Alumni		Morgantown, West Virginia	Active	
Xi Alumni		Lincoln, Nebraska	Active	
Rho Alumni		Columbia, Missouri	Active	
Tau Alumni		Menomonie, Wisconsin	Active	
Phi Alumni		Brookings, South Dakota	Active	
Psi Alumni		Tuscaloosa, Alabama	Active	
Alpha Delta Alumni		Fayetteville, Arkansas	Active	
Alpha Sigma Alumni		Muncie, Indiana	Active	
Beta Delta Alumni		Bowling Green, Kentucky	Active	
Beta Epsilon Alumni		Plattsburgh, New York	Inactive	
Beta Psi Alumni		Pomona, California	Active	
Beta Rho Alumni		Pocatello, Idaho	Active	
Gamma Beta Alumni		Conway, Arkansas	Active	
Madison Area Alumni		Madison, Wisconsin	Active	
Toledo Area Alumni		Toledo, Ohio	Active	
Electronic Alumni	2012	Facebook group	Active	
