= Lanouette =

Surname

Lanouette is a French surname.

== Notable people ==
- Chandalae Lanouette, American dancer and entertainment manager
- Irving Lanouette Price, American toy manufacturer
- Lilou Roy-Lanouette, Canadian actress
- Yan Lanouette Turgeon, Canadian film director
