= Ronald Reagan High School =

Ronald Reagan High School may refer to several high schools in the United States:

- Ronald Reagan High School (San Antonio), San Antonio, Texas
- Ronald W. Reagan/Doral Senior High School, Doral, Florida (Miami area)
- Ronald W. Reagan High School, Pfafftown, North Carolina (Winston-Salem area)
- Ronald Wilson Reagan College Preparatory High School, Milwaukee, Wisconsin

== See also ==
- Reagan High School (disambiguation)
