= Shavon Revel =

American football player (born 2001)

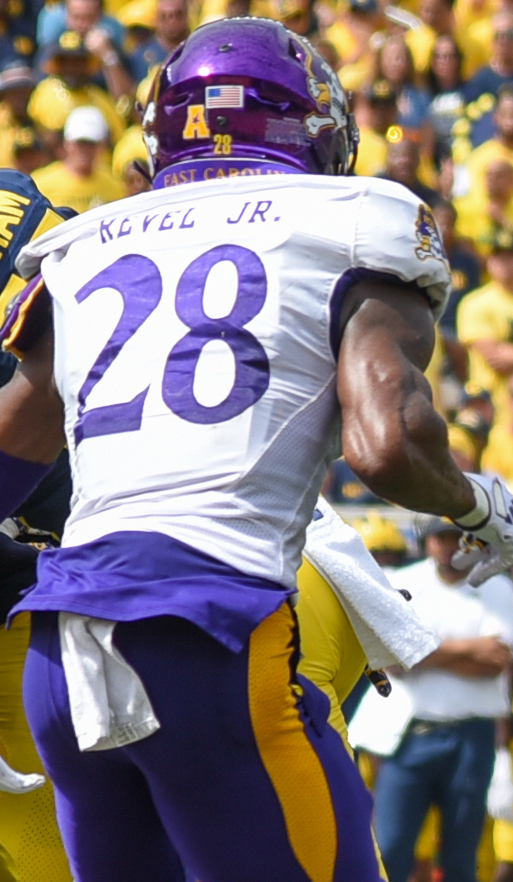
- Revel with East Carolina in 2023

No. 28 – Dallas Cowboys
- Position: Cornerback
- Roster status: Active

Personal information
- Born: April 8, 2001 (age 25)
- Listed height: 6 ft 2 in (1.88 m)
- Listed weight: 198 lb (90 kg)

Career information
- High school: Reagan (Pfafftown, North Carolina)
- College: Louisburg (2020–2021); East Carolina (2022–2024)
- NFL draft: 2025: 3rd round, 76th overall pick

Career history
- Dallas Cowboys (2025–present)

Awards and highlights
- Second-team All-AAC (2023)

Career NFL statistics as of Week 2, 2026
- Total tackles: 44
- Pass deflections: 4
- Fumble recoveries: 1
- Stats at Pro Football Reference

Shavon Revel Jr. (born April 8, 2001) is an American professional football cornerback for the Dallas Cowboys of the National Football League (NFL). He played college football for the Louisburg Hurricanes and East Carolina Pirates. Revel was selected by the Cowboys in the third round of the 2025 NFL draft.

== Early life ==
Revel was born on April 8, 2001, in the Winston-Salem, North Carolina area. He attended Richard J. Reynolds High School before transferring to Ronald W. Reagan High School in nearby Pfafftown, North Carolina as a senior. Revel played cornerback and wide receiver for their football team and was a letterman in track and field, participating in the 55 meters, 300 meters, long jump, and high jump events.

== College career ==
Revel enrolled at Louisburg College in 2020 to play college football for the Hurricanes. Due to the COVID-19 pandemic, he did not compete his freshman season and only played six games in 2021. He transferred to East Carolina University in December 2021 to play for the Pirates. Revel earned second-team American Athletic Conference honors with the Pirates in 2023. Against the Appalachian State Mountaineers in 2024, he returned an interception 50 yards for a touchdown. A few days later, he suffered a torn ACL in practice and missed the rest of the season. Revel declared for the 2025 NFL draft in November 2024.

== Professional career ==
Pre-draft measurables
Height	Weight	Arm length	Hand span	Wingspan	Bench press
6 ft 1 7/8 in (1.88 m)	194 lb (88 kg)	32 5/8 in (0.83 m)	9 5/8 in (0.24 m)	6 ft 7 3/4 in (2.03 m)	12 reps
All values from NFL Combine/Pro Day

Revel was selected in the third round (76th overall) of the 2025 NFL draft by the Dallas Cowboys. He missed the first 10 weeks of the season in rehabilitation from the torn ACL he suffered in his final year with East Carolina. Revel was activated on November 14, 2025, ahead of Dallas' Week 11 matchup against the Las Vegas Raiders.
