= Vernon Malone College and Career Academy =

American public, magnet, secondary school in North Carolina

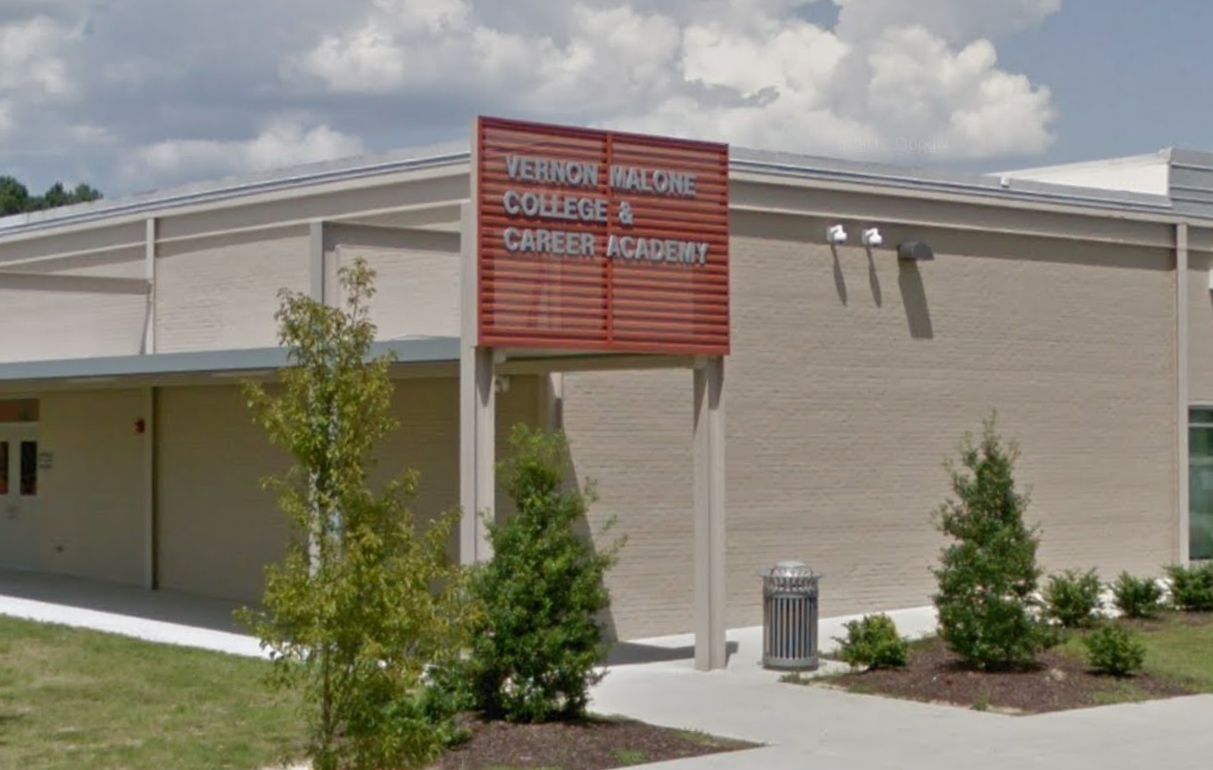

Location
- 2200 S Wilmington St; Raleigh, North Carolina; United States
- Coordinates: 35.7527°N 78.6431°W

Information
- School type: Public, magnet, secondary
- Motto: "Graduating students on time, college and career ready."
- Founded: 2014
- Sister school: Southeast Raleigh Magnet High School
- Principal: Carter Hillman
- Staff: 22.60 (FTE)
- Key people: Vernon Malone
- Grades: 9-12
- Enrollment: 378 (2018–19)
- Student to teacher ratio: 16.88
- Schedule type: Standard, 2 Core 2 Electives block
- Colors: Red, Black, Silver
- Mascot: Silverhawk
- Website: wcpss.net/vernonmalonecca

Vernon Malone College and Career Academy (VMCCA), is one of the flagship schools of Wake County Public School System. It is an application-based early college in Raleigh, North Carolina, United States. The building was formerly a Coca-Cola bottling plant before being renovated to its current configuration.: It was first opened in 2014 as a career and technical education institution focusing on college and career readiness. It has six programs offered to students through Wake Technical Community College which include; Biopharmaceutical Technology, Cosmetology, Multi-Trades/Facilities Technology, Nurse Aide, Simulation and Game Development, and Welding. The school is formally a part of the Wake County Public School System. Their official mascot is a Silverhawk.

== History ==
Vernon Malone College and Career Academy is named after former educator, politician, and school administrator, Vernon Malone. Malone was consequential in merging Wake County Public Schools and Raleigh schools, ending racial segregation in the area. When choosing the name for the college and career academy, the Wake County board of education unanimously passed a resolution signifying their support for the school to be named after Malone, who had formerly served as the first chairman for Wake County Public Schools following the merger.

The inaugural principal when the school opened in 2014, was Dr. Ashlie Thompson. She has since left the position and now serves as an Area Superintendent for Wake County Public Schools in the district that Vernon Malone College and Career Academy is in.

The school cost $24.5 million to construct.

During Hurricane Matthew, the Raleigh area sustained heavy rainfall which flooded Vernon Malone College and Career Academy and displaced students for a few months while repairs were made.

A student was arrested in February 2018 for threatening to 'shoot up' Vernon Malone College and Career Academy during a FaceTime conversation. The school responded by increasing security at the school.

== Location ==
Vernon Malone College and Career Academy is located at 2200 South Wilmington Street in Raleigh, North Carolina. The school is just south of highway I-40 and the Raleigh Beltline.

== Students ==
Vernon Malone College and Career Academy operates on a modified-traditional calendar. Students begin school at 7:25 AM and end at 2:18 PM. They operate on a standard 2 Core 2 Electives block schedule.

In its first year, the school only had 131 students, which was only 28% of its capacity. In 2024, the school had a total 359 students, with a student-to-teacher ratio of 15.6. 47.9% of students in 2024 received free or reduced lunch.

== Academics ==
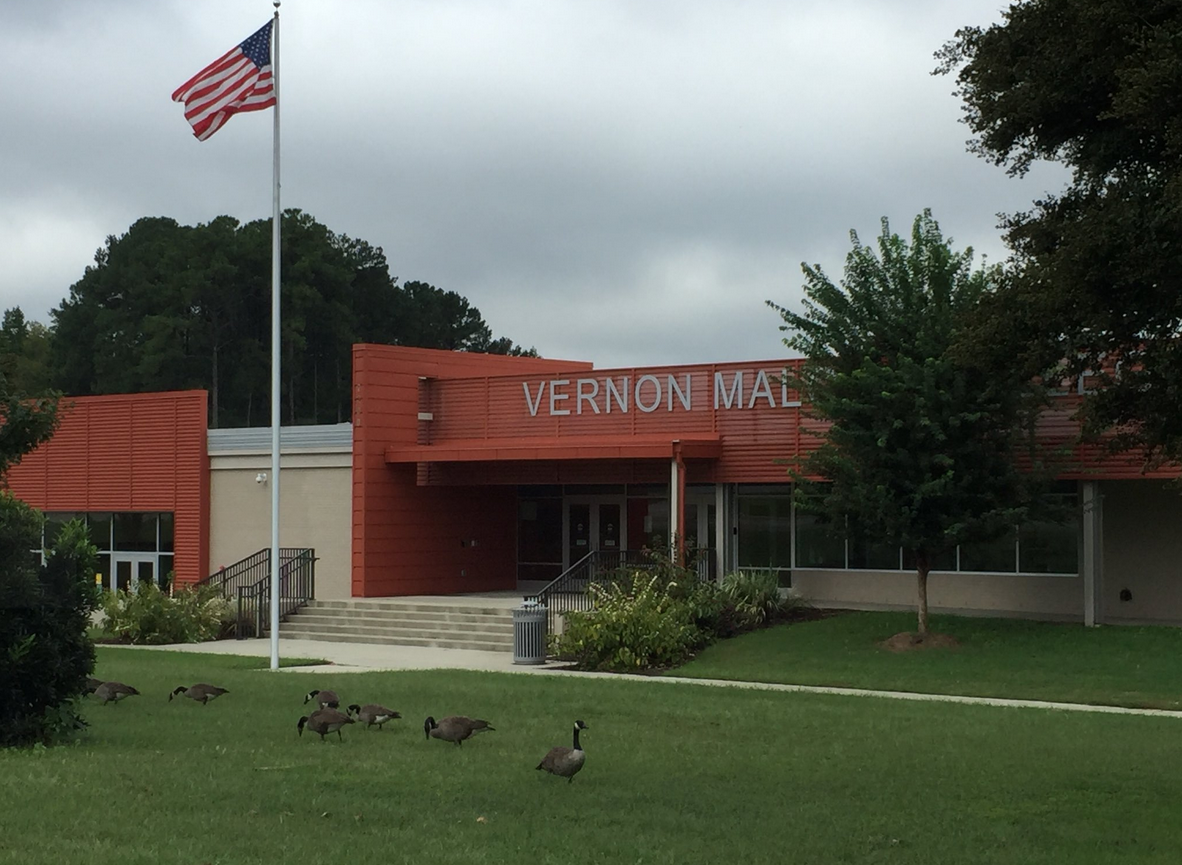
Vernon Malone College and Career Academy in 2018.

Vernon Malone College and Career Academy offers 7 English courses, 8 Mathematics courses, 8 Science courses, 7 Social Studies history courses, 5 Foreign Language courses, 3 Physical Education (PE) courses, 4 Art courses, and 15 Career and Technical Education (CTE) courses, not including any of the Wake Technical Community College courses. Of those courses, 9 are Advanced Placement (AP). These courses are accompanied by the 7 college programs, offered by Wake Technical Community College. Students are able to receive college credits that can be applied towards an Associate degree, diploma, or certificate at Wake Tech.

The school also offers various fifth-period courses after school for juniors and seniors.

== Sports ==
Athletics programs are not offered at Vernon Malone College and Career Academy. Students are eligible to participate in athletics at Southeast Raleigh Magnet High School.

== Clubs and organizations ==
Vernon Malone College and Career Academy has 13 official clubs/organizations as of the 2018–2019 school year

- Art Club
- Black Student Union
- Chess Club
- Chic-fil-A Leader Academy
- Dance Club
- FBLA
- Fellow Christian Association
- Greenhouse Club
- Japanese Language & Culture Club
- Juntos
- Model UN
- Music Club
- Muslim Student Association
- National Honor Society
- National Technical Honor Society
- Native Awareness Club
- Race Car Club
- SkillsUSA
- Student Council
- Wellness Club

== Awards ==
Vernon Malone College and Career Academy received the Magnet School of Distinction Award in 2018, 2019, 2020, 2022, 2023, and 2024 for meeting all basic requirements outlined in the merit awards scoring rubric; and was named a Magnet School of Excellence in 2025.
