= Eric Miller Reeves =

American politician from North Carolina (born 1963)

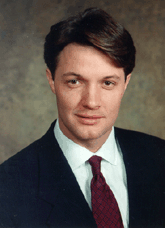

Member of the North Carolina Senate
- In office January 1, 1997 – January 1, 2005
- Preceded by: Henry McKoy; J. K. Sherron
- Succeeded by: Janet Cowell
- Constituency: 14th District (1997–2003); 16th District (2003–2005)

Personal details
- Born: Eric Miller Reeves; October 18, 1963 (age 62) Fort Sill, Oklahoma, U.S.
- Party: Democratic
- Spouse: Mary
- Education: Duke University (BA); Wake Forest University (JD)

Eric Miller Reeves (born October 18, 1963) is an attorney and a North Carolina state Senator.

== Early life and education ==
Reeves graduated from St. Mark's School of Texas in 1982, where he was a member of the wrestling team and won the Texas State Championship.

Reeves received a bachelor's degree in history from Duke University in 1986 and a Juris Doctor (J.D.) degree from Wake Forest University in 1989.

== Career ==
Reeves practiced law in Raleigh and was elected to Raleigh City Council in 1993, serving two terms.

He was elected to the North Carolina State Senate in 1996 as a Democrat, representing the state's fourteenth – later sixteenth – district. He went on to chair the Senate's technology committee, served as chair of Human Services Appropriations, and on the Education Oversight Committee.

Reeves also served as co-chair of the Senate Information Technology Committee. He resigned from his chair in 2004 after serving four terms as a state Senator.

Reeves is the General Counsel and Director of Public Affairs for SchoolDude.com, a provider of software management tools for Educational Facilities.

North Carolina Senate
Preceded by Henry McKoy; J. K. Sherron	Member of the North Carolina Senate from the 14th district 1997–2003; Served alongside: Brad Miller	Succeeded by Vernon Malone
Preceded by Eleanor Kinnaird; Howard Lee	Member of the North Carolina Senate from the 16th district 2003–2005	Succeeded by Janet Cowell
