= Southeast Raleigh Magnet High School =

American public school in North Carolina

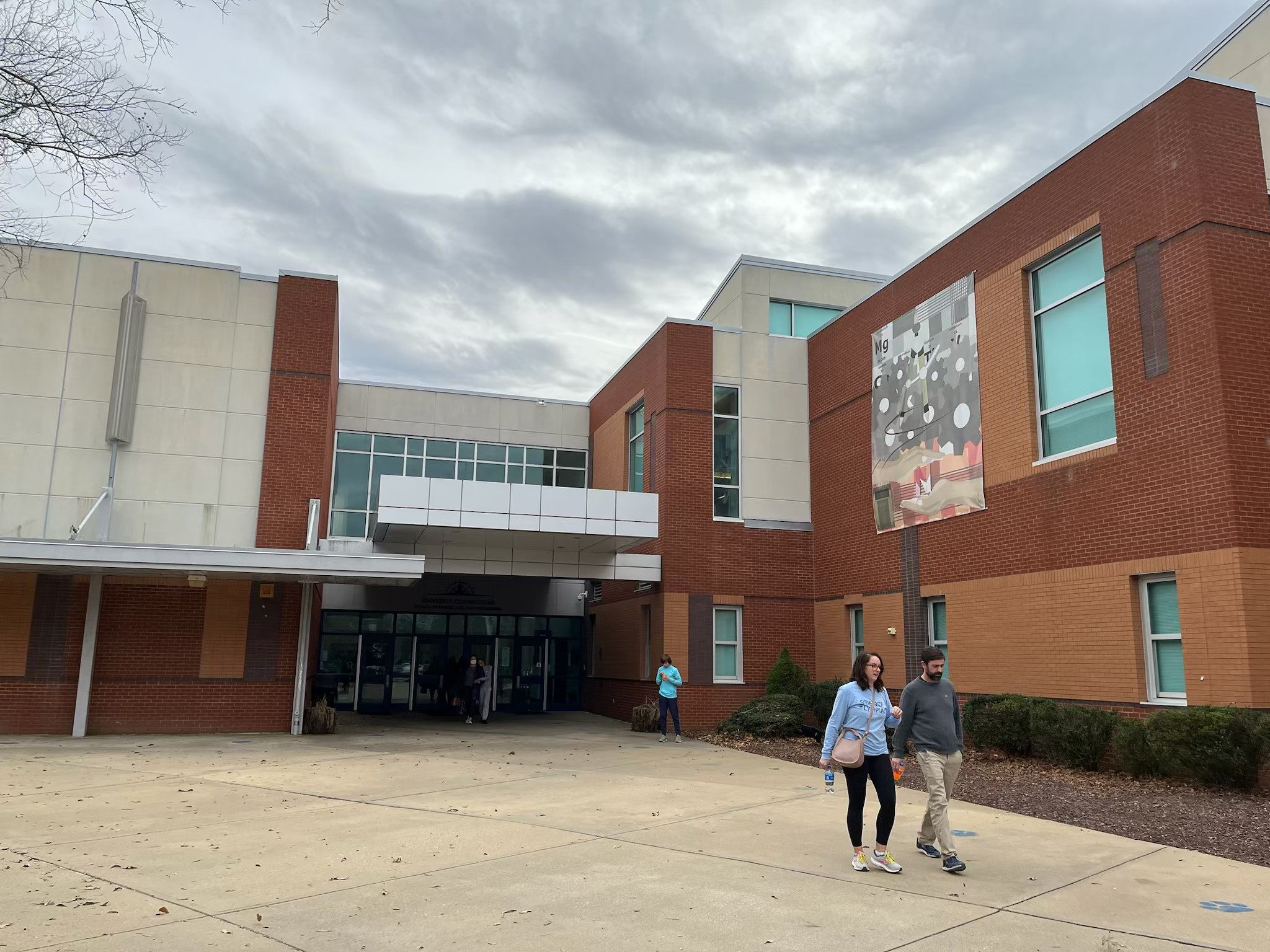

Location
- 2600 Rock Quarry Road; Raleigh, North Carolina 27610; United States; 35°44′45″N 78°36′14″W

Information
- Type: Public
- Established: 1997 (29 years ago)
- Sister school: Vernon Malone College and Career Academy
- CEEB code: 343239
- Principal: Eddie Harden
- Staff: 101.83 (FTE)
- Grades: 9–12
- Enrollment: 1,490 (2023–2024)
- Student to teacher ratio: 14.63
- Colors: Green and navy
- Mascot: Bulldog
- Website: Southeast Raleigh Magnet High School

Southeast Raleigh Magnet High School is a magnet high school in Raleigh, North Carolina, United States. It opened in 1997 as a magnet school with a focus on math, science, and technology. The current magnet theme is University Connections, which focuses on providing students with interactions and experiences with colleges, universities, and workplace environments while still in high school. The school operates on a modified calendar, with the fall semester usually starting in late July and with longer, more frequent breaks during the school year, completing classes before the end of May.

== History ==
In February 1994 Wake County officials asked the Wake County School Board to provide a school for the southeastern area of Raleigh; its teaching should focus on math, science, and technology. On July 28, 1997, the school opened for grades 9 to 12, with an initial student population of 1100. Beginning with the 2004–2005 school year, the school changed its name to Southeast Raleigh Magnet High School: Center for Leadership and Technology. The name change came with a new initiative on the part of former principal John Modest to encourage students through school activities to develop strong leadership skills. In 2018, the school changed its magnet focus again to University Connections.

Since its opening many concepts pioneered at Southeast Raleigh Magnet High School have been implemented throughout Wake County, including block scheduling and senior graduation projects.

== Students ==
In the school year 2006/2007, the school had a total population of 1,866 students. Southeast Raleigh Magnet High School originally was built to serve 1,699 students, but has added 16 mobile units (trailers) to increase that number to 2,083. With the trailers, the school is at 89.6% of its full capacity. Students attend school from 7:25 AM to 2:30 PM, with four classes each semester. Some classes, such as Advanced Placement courses, marching band and upper-level chorus, also operate on "A" or "B" days, allowing semester-long classes to be stretched out over a year.

The school was featured on MTV's High School Stories for a student off-campus lunch pass forgery ring.

== Administration ==
The school has been led by George "Eddie" Harden, a former assistant principal from North Mecklenburg High School, and former teacher at Southeast Raleigh, since 2020. He is the school's seventh principal.

#	Principal	Term start	Term end
1	John Modest	1997	2005
2	Beulah Wright	2005	2011
3	John Wall	2011	2012
4	David Schwenker	2012	2014
5	Candis Jones	2014	2017
6	Stephanie Smith	2017	2019
7	Eddie Harden	2020	present

== Athletics ==
The school's athletic teams are known as the Bulldogs and the school colors are navy blue and dark green. They are members of the North Carolina High School Athletic Association and compete at the 7A level for all sports, classified as 7A for the purposes of football playoffs. They are members of the Greater Neuse River conference. The school's football stadium is named for John H. Baker Jr., a former NFL player and Wake County Sheriff, and the school's basketball court is named after John Modest, the school's first principal.

=== Sports sponsored ===
Fall season

- Cheerleading
- Football
- Women's volleyball
- Cross country
- Men's soccer
- Women's golf
- Women's gymnastics
- Women's tennis

Winter season

- Cheerleading
- Indoor track
- Swimming
- Basketball
- Wrestling

Spring season

- Baseball
- Softball
- Men's golf
- Men's lacrosse
- Men's tennis
- Women's soccer
- Women's stunt

== Notable alumni ==
- Darrius Barnes, professional soccer player in the MLS
- William Cashion, bassist of Future Islands
- Wayne Davis II, Olympic Hurdler who competed at the 2012 Summer Olympics
- Nikki Glaspie, funk drummer
- Leroy Harris, NFL offensive guard
- Gabby Mayo, American sprinter
- Daniel McCullers, NFL defensive lineman
- Brian Simmons, Canadian Football League offensive tackle
- Melvin Sutton, NFL cheerleader
