= Carolina Topcats =

Cheerleading squad of the Carolina Panthers

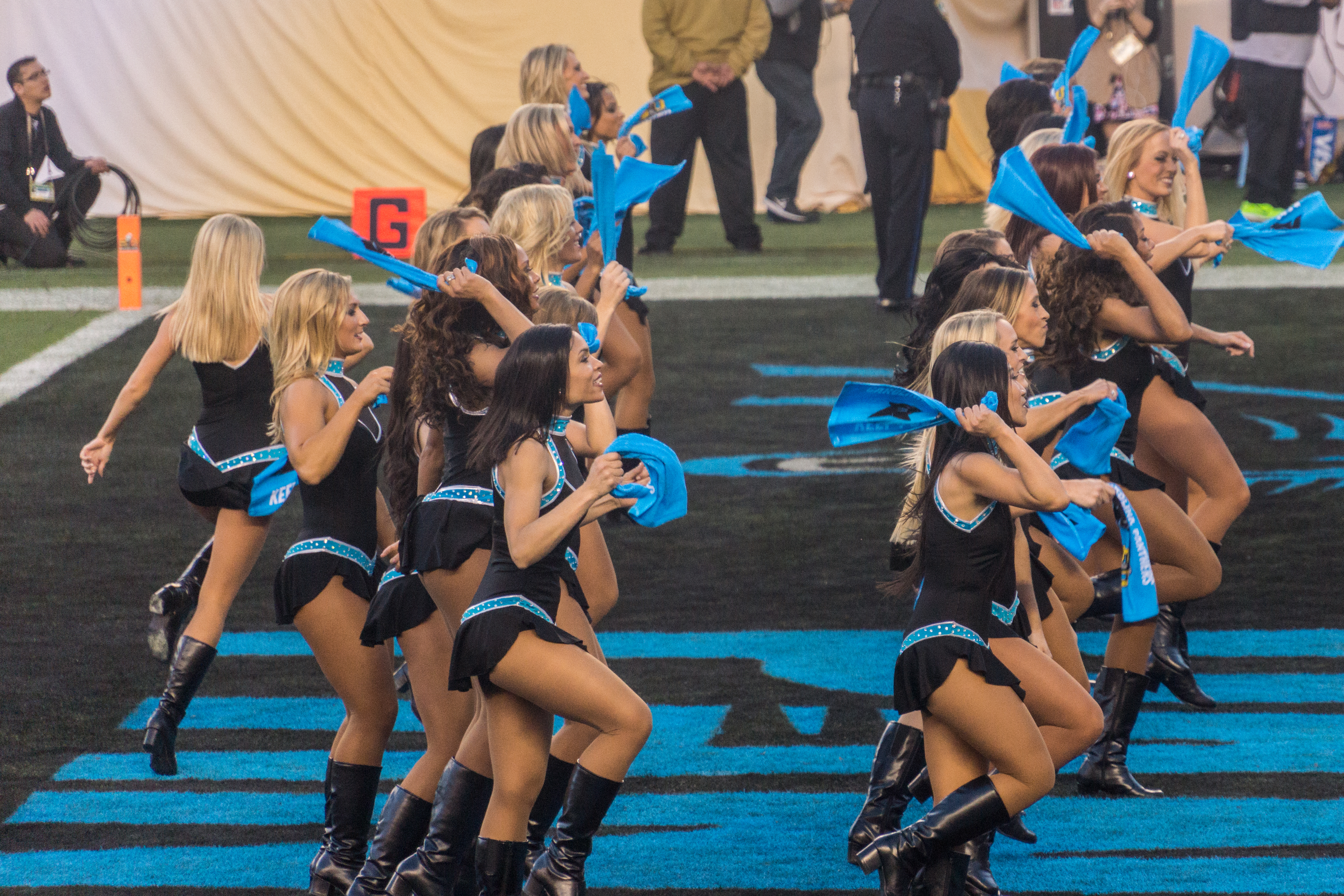
- TopCats at Super Bowl 50
- Established: 1995
- Members: 30
- Director: Brandii McCoy
- Affiliations: Carolina Panthers
- Website: Carolina TopCats

Carolina TopCats Cheerleaders are the official cheerleading squad of the NFL's Carolina Panthers. The TopCats perform during home games at Bank of America Stadium, the home stadium of the Panthers. In 2022, the TopCats became the first cheerleading team of the National Football League to hire an openly transgender cheerleader.

== Function ==
Auditions for the TopCats are typically held annually in April, which also take place at Bank of America Stadium. The group makes appearances at various events, as well as corporate appearances. The squad's staff includes Nicole Smith, Cheerleader Manager and Choreographer. As of 2016, the squad currently features 31 members. The squad also has a "Junior TopCats" program, where girls from across the Carolinas participate in three clinics and learn a halftime routine to perform with the TopCats during a Panthers home game.

Carolina Topcat Shannon Phillips at Fort Bragg in 2012

== History ==
The squad was founded in 1995. In 2021, the TopCats, which had historically been all-women, added three male cheerleaders, Tre' Booker, Melvin Sutton, and Chris Crawford, to their roster. In 2022, the TopCats became the first cheerleading team in the National Football League to add an openly transgender woman to their team, Justine Lindsay.

=== TopCats controversy ===
Controversy ensued in November 2005 when two Topcats allegedly had sex with each other in a bar in the Channel District of Downtown Tampa, Florida. Both of them were drunk and had been unable to leave the bar. One of the cheerleaders, who was underage for drinking, hit a patron in the face and was violent and rude towards police that attempted to apprehend them. She also allegedly gave officers a driver's license that belonged to a different member of the squad who wasn't in Tampa at the time. She was later charged with battery and giving a false name. The other was charged with disorderly conduct and resisting arrest, and was later released on a $750 bail. Both were eventually removed from the squad on November 7 for violating a code that they signed which bans conduct that can be considered embarrassing to the Panthers.

== Notable cheerleaders ==
- Tre' Booker, off-broadway actor and one of the first male cheerleaders on the Topcats
- Chris Crawford, one of the first openly gay cheerleaders on the Topcats
- Chandalae Lanouette, entertainment manager for the Carolina Panthers
- Justine Lindsay (2022–2023), first openly transgender cheerleader in the NFL
- Melvin Sutton, one of the first male cheerleaders on the Topcats
