= Reagan High School =

Reagan High School may refer to:

- John H. Reagan High School (Austin, Texas)
- Heights High School (formerly John H. Reagan High School) (Houston, Texas)

== See also ==
For schools named after Ronald Reagan:

- Ronald Reagan High School (disambiguation)
