= North Carolina's 14th Senate district =

American legislative district

North Carolina's 14th State Senate district
Senator
Dan Blue; D–Raleigh
- Demographics: 32% White; 41% Black; 20% Hispanic; 2% Asian; 1% Other; 3% Multiracial
- Population (2023): 208,449

North Carolina's 14th Senate district is one of 50 districts in the North Carolina Senate. It has been represented by Democrat Dan Blue since 2009.

== Geography ==
Since 2003, the district has included part of Wake County. The district overlaps with the 33rd, 38th, 39th, and 66th state house districts.

== District officeholders since 1973 ==
=== Multi-member district ===
Senator	Party	Dates	Notes	Senator	Party	Dates	Notes	Senator	Party	Dates	Notes	Counties
Bobby Barker (Raleigh)	Democratic	January 1, 1973 – January 1, 1977		Robert Barker (Apex)	Republican	January 1, 1973 – January 1, 1975		William Staton (Sanford)	Democratic	January 1, 1973 – January 1, 1977	Redistricted from the 13th district.	1973–1983; All of Wake, Harnett, and Lee counties.
Bobby Barker (Raleigh)	Democratic	January 1, 1973 – January 1, 1977		John Winters (Raleigh)	Democratic	January 1, 1975 – January 1, 1979		William Staton (Sanford)	Democratic	January 1, 1973 – January 1, 1977	Redistricted from the 13th district.	1973–1983; All of Wake, Harnett, and Lee counties.
I. Beverly Lake Jr. (Raleigh)	Democratic	January 1, 1977 – October 1979	Switched parties and retired to run for Governor.	John Winters (Raleigh)	Democratic	January 1, 1975 – January 1, 1979		Robert Wynne (Raleigh)	Democratic	January 1, 1977 – January 1, 1983		1973–1983; All of Wake, Harnett, and Lee counties.
I. Beverly Lake Jr. (Raleigh)	Democratic	January 1, 1977 – October 1979	Switched parties and retired to run for Governor.	William Creech (Raleigh)	Democratic	January 1, 1979 – January 1, 1983		Robert Wynne (Raleigh)	Democratic	January 1, 1977 – January 1, 1983		1973–1983; All of Wake, Harnett, and Lee counties.
I. Beverly Lake Jr. (Raleigh)	Republican	October 1979 – January 1, 1981	Switched parties and retired to run for Governor.	William Creech (Raleigh)	Democratic	January 1, 1979 – January 1, 1983		Robert Wynne (Raleigh)	Democratic	January 1, 1977 – January 1, 1983		1973–1983; All of Wake, Harnett, and Lee counties.
Joseph Johnson (Raleigh)	Democratic	January 1, 1981 – January 1, 1995	Retired.	William Creech (Raleigh)	Democratic	January 1, 1979 – January 1, 1983		Robert Wynne (Raleigh)	Democratic	January 1, 1977 – January 1, 1983		1973–1983; All of Wake, Harnett, and Lee counties.
Joseph Johnson (Raleigh)	Democratic	January 1, 1981 – January 1, 1995	Retired.	Wilma Woodard (Garner)	Democratic	January 1, 1983 – January 1, 1987		William Staton (Sanford)	Democratic	January 1, 1983 – January 1, 1993	Redistricted to the 15th district and retired.	1983–1993; All of Lee and Harnett counties. Part of Wake County.
Joseph Johnson (Raleigh)	Democratic	January 1, 1981 – January 1, 1995	Retired.	J. K. Sherron (Raleigh)	Democratic	January 1, 1987 – January 1, 1997	Retired.	William Staton (Sanford)	Democratic	January 1, 1983 – January 1, 1993	Redistricted to the 15th district and retired.	1983–1993; All of Lee and Harnett counties. Part of Wake County.
Joseph Johnson (Raleigh)	Democratic	January 1, 1981 – January 1, 1995	Retired.	J. K. Sherron (Raleigh)	Democratic	January 1, 1987 – January 1, 1997	Retired.					1993–2003; Parts of Wake and Johnston counties.
Henry McKoy (Raleigh)	Republican	January 1, 1995 – January 1, 1997	Lost re-election.	J. K. Sherron (Raleigh)	Democratic	January 1, 1987 – January 1, 1997	Retired.					1993–2003; Parts of Wake and Johnston counties.
Brad Miller (Raleigh)	Democratic	January 1, 1997 – January 1, 2003	Redistricted to the 16th district and retired to run for Congress.	Eric Miller Reeves (Raleigh)	Democratic	January 1, 1997 – January 1, 2003	Redistricted to the 16th district.					1993–2003; Parts of Wake and Johnston counties.

=== Single-member district ===
Senator	Party	Dates	Notes	Counties
Vernon Malone (Raleigh)	Democratic	January 1, 2003 – April 18, 2009	Died.	2003–Present; Part of Wake County.
Vacant		April 18, 2009 – May 19, 2009		2003–Present; Part of Wake County.
Dan Blue (Raleigh)	Democratic	May 19, 2009 – Present	Appointed to finish Malone's term.	2003–Present; Part of Wake County.

== Election results ==
=== 2024 ===
North Carolina Senate 14th district Democratic primary election, 2024
Party	Candidate	Votes	%
Democratic	Dan Blue (incumbent)	16,816	85.51%
Democratic	Terry Passione	2,850	14.49%
Total votes		19,666	100%

North Carolina Senate 14th district general election, 2024
Party	Candidate	Votes	%
Democratic	Dan Blue (incumbent)	74,519	73.46%
Republican	Angela McCarty	23,978	23.64%
Libertarian	Sammie Brooks	2,945	2.90%
Total votes		101,442	100%
Democratic hold			

=== 2022 ===
North Carolina Senate 14th district general election, 2022
Party	Candidate	Votes	%
Democratic	Dan Blue (incumbent)	45,020	68.97%
Republican	Chris Baker	18,378	28.16%
Libertarian	Matthew Laszacs	1,875	2.87%
Total votes		65,273	100%
Democratic hold			

=== 2020 ===
North Carolina Senate 14th district general election, 2020
Party	Candidate	Votes	%
Democratic	Dan Blue (incumbent)	78,811	72.68%
Republican	Alan David Michael	24,678	22.76%
Libertarian	Justin Walczak	4,949	4.56%
Total votes		108,438	100%
Democratic hold			

=== 2018 ===
North Carolina Senate 14th district general election, 2018
Party	Candidate	Votes	%
Democratic	Dan Blue (incumbent)	55,035	71.36%
Republican	Sandy Andrews	19,951	25.87%
Libertarian	Richard Haygood	2,138	2.77%
Total votes		77,124	100%
Democratic hold			

=== 2016 ===
North Carolina Senate 14th district general election, 2016
Party	Candidate	Votes	%
Democratic	Dan Blue (incumbent)	73,870	100%
Total votes		73,870	100%
Democratic hold			

=== 2014 ===
North Carolina Senate 14th district general election, 2014
Party	Candidate	Votes	%
Democratic	Dan Blue (incumbent)	44,879	100%
Total votes		44,879	100%
Democratic hold			

=== 2012 ===
North Carolina Senate 14th district general election, 2012
Party	Candidate	Votes	%
Democratic	Dan Blue (incumbent)	72,652	100%
Total votes		72,652	100%
Democratic hold			

=== 2010 ===
North Carolina Senate 14th district general election, 2010
Party	Candidate	Votes	%
Democratic	Dan Blue (incumbent)	40,746	65.92%
Republican	Geoffrey M. Hurlburt	21,067	34.08%
Total votes		61,813	100%
Democratic hold			

=== 2008 ===
North Carolina Senate 14th district Democratic primary election, 2008
Party	Candidate	Votes	%
Democratic	Vernon Malone (incumbent)	28,564	71.50%
Democratic	Ann House Akland	11,383	28.50%
Total votes		39,947	100%

North Carolina Senate 14th district general election, 2008
Party	Candidate	Votes	%
Democratic	Vernon Malone (incumbent)	67,823	69.45%
Republican	Carol Bennett	29,835	30.55%
Total votes		97,658	100%
Democratic hold			

=== 2006 ===
North Carolina Senate 14th district general election, 2006
Party	Candidate	Votes	%
Democratic	Vernon Malone (incumbent)	26,404	65.93%
Republican	Richard Doeffinger	13,644	34.07%
Total votes		40,048	100%
Democratic hold			

=== 2004 ===
North Carolina Senate 14th district Republican primary election, 2004
Party	Candidate	Votes	%
Republican	John Odoom	2,451	54.91%
Republican	Carol Bennett	1,413	31.65%
Republican	Johnnie C. Mayfield	600	13.44%
Total votes		4,464	100%

North Carolina Senate 14th district general election, 2004
Party	Candidate	Votes	%
Democratic	Vernon Malone (incumbent)	45,727	64.11%
Republican	John Odoom	25,595	35.89%
Total votes		71,322	100%
Democratic hold			

=== 2002 ===
North Carolina Senate 14th district Republican primary election, 2002
Party	Candidate	Votes	%
Republican	Carol Bennett	1,999	55.65%
Republican	Loretta Thompson	1,593	44.35%
Total votes		3,592	100%

North Carolina Senate 14th district general election, 2002
Party	Candidate	Votes	%
Democratic	Vernon Malone	28,469	64.55%
Republican	Carol Bennett	14,518	32.92%
Libertarian	Richard Davison	1,117	2.53%
Total votes		44,104	100%
Democratic win (new seat)			

=== 2000 ===
North Carolina Senate 14th district general election, 2000
Party	Candidate	Votes	%
Democratic	Brad Miller (incumbent)	79,871	38.53%
Democratic	Eric Miller Reeves (incumbent)	65,816	31.75%
Republican	John W. Bryant	61,599	29.72%
Total votes		207,286	100%
Democratic hold			
Democratic hold			
