= Madison County High School =

Madison County High School is the name of several educational institutions in the United States:

- Madison County High School (Alabama) in Gurley, Alabama
- Madison County High School (Florida) in Madison, Florida
- Madison County High School (Georgia) in Danielsville, Georgia
- Madison County High School (Virginia) in Madison, Virginia
