= Chris Crawford (dancer) =

American dancer

- Born: Macon, Georgia, U.S.
- Education: University of North Carolina School of the Arts
- Occupations: Dancer; Cheerleader
- Career
- Former groups: Carolina Topcats

Chris Crawford is an American dancer and professional cheerleader. He was one of the first male cheerleaders and first openly gay cheerleaders on the Carolina Topcats.

== Early life ==
Crawford grew up in Macon, Georgia. He started dance training in middle school and went on to study ballet and contemporary dance at the University of North Carolina School of the Arts.

== Career ==
Crawford auditioned for the Carolina Topcats, the official NFL cheerleading squad for the Carolina Panthers, in 2021. He became one of the first men, alongside Tre' Booker and Melvin Sutton, to make the squad. He and Booker became the first two openly gay cheerleaders on the Topcats.

== Personal life ==
Crawford is gay.

== See also ==
- Justine Lindsay
