= Brad Miller (politician) =

American politician (born 1953)

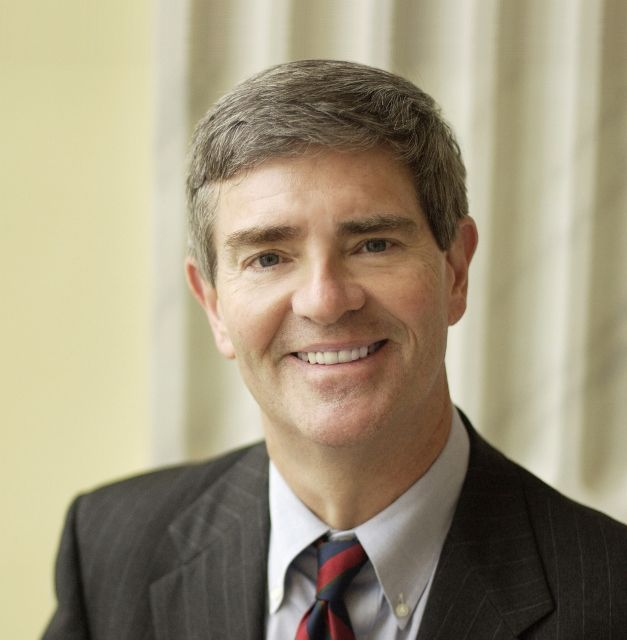

Member of the U.S. House of Representatives from North Carolina's 13th district
- In office January 3, 2003 – January 3, 2013
- Preceded by: Constituency reestablished
- Succeeded by: George Holding

Member of the North Carolina Senate from the 14th district
- In office January 1, 1997 – January 1, 2003 Serving with Eric Reeves
- Preceded by: Henry McKoy; J. K. Sherron
- Succeeded by: Eric Reeves (redistricted)

Member of the North Carolina House of Representatives from the 61st district
- In office January 1, 1993 – January 1, 1995
- Preceded by: Art Pope
- Succeeded by: Chuck Neely

Personal details
- Born: Ralph Bradley Miller; May 19, 1953 (age 73) Fayetteville, North Carolina, U.S.
- Party: Democratic
- Education: University of North Carolina, Chapel Hill (BA); London School of Economics (MS); Columbia University (JD)

Ralph Bradley Miller (born May 19, 1953) is an American attorney, congressman and former U.S. representative for North Carolina's 13th congressional district, serving five terms from 2003 to 2013. District 13 included all of Caswell and Person counties, and parts of Alamance, Granville, Guilford, Rockingham and Wake counties. He is a member of the Democratic Party. Before his election to Congress, he served in the North Carolina House of Representatives and the North Carolina Senate.

== Early life, education, and law career ==
Miller was born in Fayetteville, North Carolina to Margaret Hale Miller and Nathan David Miller.

Miller earned a BA degree from the University of North Carolina at Chapel Hill in 1975, a Master's degree from the London School of Economics in 1978, and a Juris Doctor from Columbia Law School in 1979. After graduation he served as clerk to Judge J. Dickson Phillips Jr. of the United States Court of Appeals for the Fourth Circuit.

Miller practiced Law in Raleigh before entering politics.

== North Carolina legislature ==
He was a member of the North Carolina House of Representatives from 1992 until 1994 and a member of the North Carolina Senate from 1996 to 2002.

== U.S. House of Representatives ==
=== Elections ===
In 2002, Miller was elected to represent North Carolina's 13th congressional district in the United States House of Representatives. Following the 2000 Census, Miller had a hand in redrawing the district map which established NC 13. During the 2002 election, Miller advanced from a crowded Democratic primary, which included former Congressman Robin Britt, to defeat Republican Carolyn Grant and a Libertarian candidate with roughly 55% of the vote. Grant later sued Miller alleging, among other things, that he and his campaign defamed her in an October 2002 television advertisement. She later dropped the suit after she failed to comply with several court orders.

Miller was elected to his second term in the 2004 Congressional elections, earning 59% of the vote and defeating Republican Virginia Johnson.

Miller's opponent in the 2006 race was Vernon Robinson, a conservative African American politician who is a former city council member and current resident of Winston-Salem, North Carolina (outside the thirteenth congressional district). Robinson was able to garner national attention due to his bombastic and exaggerative rhetoric. Robinson made several accusations against Miller, including that he was cutting money from US troops to study the sex lives of prostitutes. He also claimed that Miller was gay, despite having a wife, and that he was allowing illegal immigrants to sneak into America. Miller defeated Robinson 63.71% to 36.29%.

In 2007 Miller considered a run for the U.S. Senate against incumbent Elizabeth Dole but decided against it. Later, he ruled out running against Sen. Richard Burr in 2010.

After the 2010 United States census, Republicans who controlled the state's General Assembly redrew the districts. In the process, they placed Miller into a new, heavily Republican 13th District stretching from northern Raleigh all the way to Surry County on the other side of the state. While Barack Obama carried the old 13th fairly handily with 59 percent of the vote, John McCain would have won the reconfigured 13th with 56 percent of the vote.

However, after 1st District Congressman G. K. Butterfield raised objections that the new map violated the rights of African-American voters in the eastern part of the state, the state legislature was forced to redraw the map again. The new plan made the 13th more compact, taking in territory from areas just west and east of Raleigh to just east of Rocky Mount. However, it was still significantly more Republican than its predecessor; McCain would have won it with 54 percent. The new map also placed Miller's apartment complex 50 yards inside the 4th district, represented by fellow Democrat David Price, but left the rest of Miller's precinct in the 13th. On January 26, 2012, Miller announced that he would not seek re-election to Congress.

=== Tenure ===
Education

Miller co-founded and co-chairs the bipartisan congressional Community College caucus, which educates members of Congress on the importance of community colleges. For his efforts, he was recognized with the Congressional Award from the Council for Resource Development.

Healthcare reform

Miller voted for the Patient Protection and Affordable Care Act in March, 2010.

Financial reform

The Mortgage Reform and Anti-Predatory Lending Act of 2009 In Congress, Miller served on the House Financial Services Committee, where he has worked to protect consumers from abusive lending, especially predatory mortgage lending. In 2007 and 2009 the House passed comprehensive federal mortgage lending reform legislation authored by Miller, but neither bill was subsequently considered in the Senate.

Financial Product Safety Commission Act of 2009

In 2009 Miller introduced legislation with Rep. Bill Delahunt (D-MA) to establish a Financial Product Safety Commission. The bill, modeled on a concept proposed by Harvard Law School Professor Elizabeth Warren, was subsequently included in the financial regulatory reform package announced by Treasury Secretary Timothy Geithner on July 24, 2009.

Emergency Homeownership and Mortgage Equity Protection Act of 2007

On September 20, 2007 Miller introduced H.R. 3609, becoming the first member of Congress to propose that bankruptcy courts be allowed to modify the mortgage debt of persons in foreclosure or against whom foreclosure proceedings had been commenced.

AIG Hearing

On March 18, 2009 Miller, a member of the Financial Services Committee, excoriated American International Group (AIG) Chairman Edward Liddy during testimony pertaining to the insurance company's controversial financial policies following its receipt of federal assistance. Miller cited AIG's allocation of $49.5 billion of taxpayer resources toward bank credit insurance policies, criticizing the company for acting to compromise "market discipline."

Repeal of Defense of Marriage Act

In September 2011, Miller announced that he will co-sponsor a bill that would repeal the Defense of Marriage Act, the 1996 law that forbids federal agencies from recognizing the legal marriages of gay and lesbian couples. Describing the legislation, Miller said "North Carolina would still not be required to perform civil marriage, but it would be required to recognize marriages performed in other states." The announcement comes on the heels of the North Carolina Legislature announcing that it would include a proposed constitutional amendment on the next ballot banning gay marriage.

Environment

Miller was originally in favor of having the National Bio and Agro-Defense Facility (NBAF) located close to his district in Butner, North Carolina, but changed his mind after his constituents objected to the project.

=== Committee assignments ===
- Committee on Financial Services
  - Subcommittee on Capital Markets, Insurance, and Government-Sponsored Enterprises
  - Subcommittee on Financial Institutions and Consumer Credit
  - Subcommittee on Oversight and Investigations
- Committee on Science, Space and Technology
  - Subcommittee on Energy and Environment (Ranking Member)
  - Subcommittee on Investigations and Oversight

In January 2007 Miller was named to the House Foreign Affairs Committee. Soon thereafter he was appointed chairman of the new Science and Technology Subcommittee on Investigations and Oversight.

=== Caucus memberships ===
- Historic Preservation Caucus (Chair)
- African Great Lakes Caucus (Co-Chair)
- Congressional Bike Caucus
- Congressional Caucus on Youth Sports
- Congressional Community College Caucus (Co-Chair)
- International Conservation Caucus
- Congressional Arts Caucus

== Personal life ==
Miller is an occasional blogger at the Daily Kos. He is an Episcopalian.

== See also ==
- North Carolina Democratic Party

U.S. House of Representatives
Constituency reestablished	Member of the U.S. House of Representatives from North Carolina's 13th congressional district 2003–2013	Succeeded by George Holding
U.S. order of precedence (ceremonial)
Preceded by Robin Hayes as Former U.S. Representative	Order of precedence of the United States as Former U.S. Representative	Succeeded by Claudine Schneider as Former U.S. Representative
