= Thomas Jefferson Junior High School =

Thomas Jefferson Junior High School may refer to:

- Thomas Jefferson Junior High School, Woodridge, Illinois
- Thomas Jefferson Junior High School, Kearns, Utah
- Thomas Jefferson Junior High School, Arlington, Virginia, now Thomas Jefferson Middle School
