= Madison High School =

Madison High School may refer to:

- Madison County High School (Alabama), Gurley, Alabama
- Madison High School (Idaho), Rexburg, Idaho
- Madison Consolidated High School, Madison, Indiana
- Madison High School (Kansas), Madison, Kansas
- Kentucky:
  - Madison High School (Richmond, Kentucky), closed in 1989
  - Madison Southern High School, Berea, Kentucky
  - Madison Central High School (Kentucky), Richmond, Kentucky
- Madison High School (Michigan), Madison Heights, Michigan
- Madison Central High School (Mississippi), Madison, Mississippi
- Madison High School (Nebraska), Madison, Nebraska
- Madison High School (New Jersey), Madison, New Jersey
- James Madison High School (Brooklyn), Brooklyn, New York
- Madison High School (North Carolina), Marshall, North Carolina
- Ohio:
  - Groveport Madison High School, Groveport, Ohio
  - Madison-Plains High School, London, Ohio
  - Madison High School (Madison, Ohio)
  - Madison Comprehensive High School, Mansfield, Ohio
  - Madison High School (Middletown, Ohio)
- Madison High School (Oregon), Portland, Oregon
- Madison Academic Magnet High School, Jackson, Tennessee
- Madison High School (Houston), Texas
- Madison County High School (Virginia)

== See also ==
- James Madison High School (disambiguation)
