= Coolidge Middle School =

Coolidge Middle School may refer to:

- Coolidge Middle School (Massachusetts), in Reading, Massachusetts
- Coolidge Middle School (Illinois), operated by Granite City Community Unit School District 9 in Granite City, Illinois
- Calvin Coolidge Middle School (Illinois) in Peoria, Illinois
