= Thomas Jefferson School (Sacramento, California) =

Historic school in California, US

- U.S. National Register of Historic Places
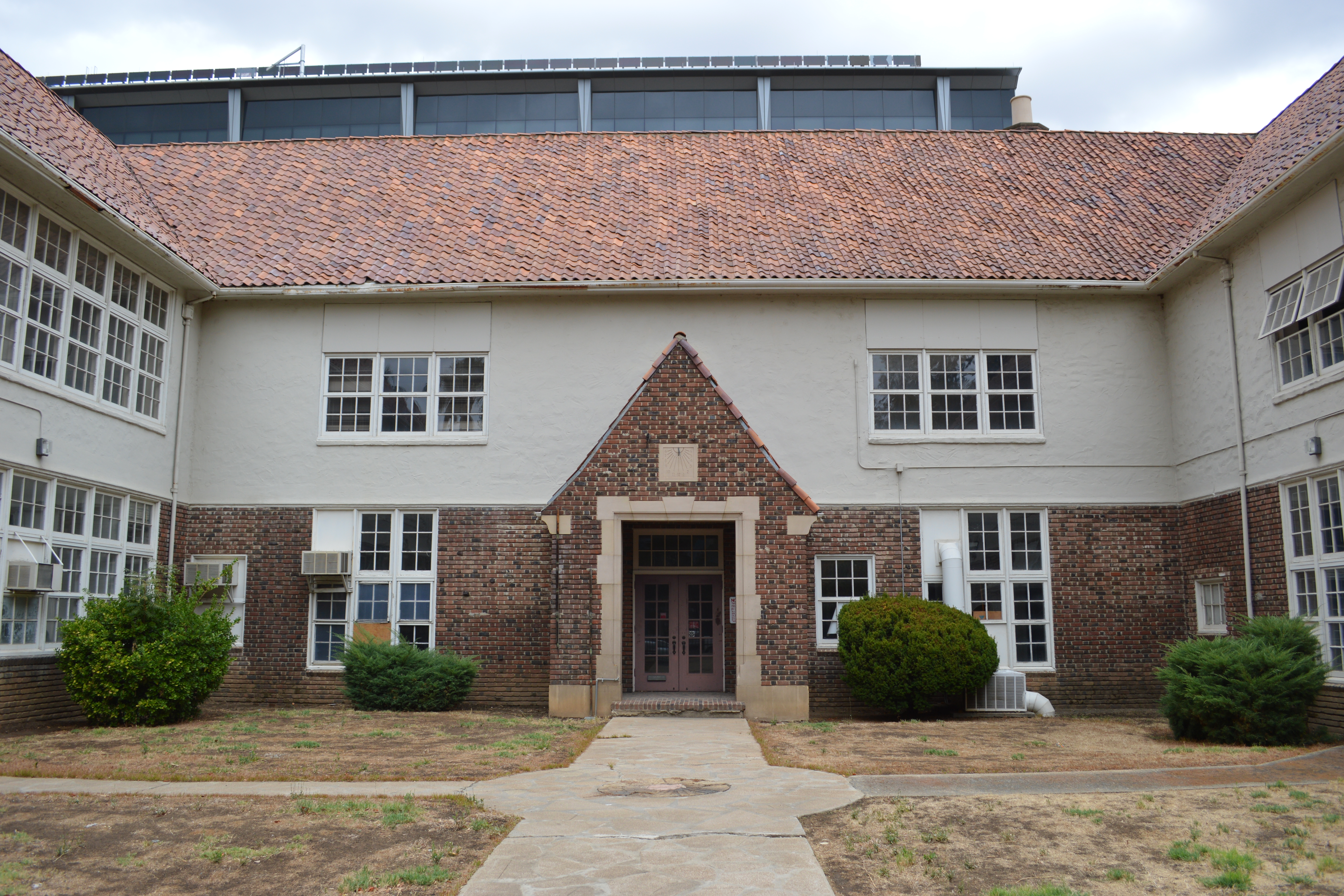

- Location within Sacramento, California Location within California Location within the United States
- Location: 1619 N St., Sacramento, California
- Coordinates: 38°34′25.8″N 121°29′10.6″W
- Area: 1.18 acres (0.48 ha)
- Built: 1922
- Architect: James S. Dean; E.C. Hemmings
- Architectural style: Tudor Revival
- NRHP reference No.: 100006319
- Added to NRHP: March 17, 2021

The Thomas Jefferson School is a historic elementary school building located in Sacramento, California designed in the Tudor Revival style. Designed by Sacramento School District's Architectural and Engineering Commission Chairman E.C. Hemmings and James S. Dean of local architecture firm Dean & Dean, and built by Robert Trost.

== History ==
The original Jefferson School building, constructed in 1870, was the oldest in Sacramento, before it was expanded as part of a school building program planned in the 1920s. The original building was considered too small and did not have enough windows to allow for sufficient sunlight.

In 1919, Superintendent of Schools Charles C. Hughes proposed a bond to fund a district-wide program of school construction, seeking to build three new schools including a high school. It also looked to add to two schools and abandon and rebuild seven existing schools, including Jefferson School, on new sites. Many of the old school buildings were too small for the growing population and wood-framed, which was vulnerable to fire. The $2,304,000 was passed by Sacramento voters in October 1919.

In November 1919, local architects appealed to the Board of Education to appoint an architectural commission that would design the school bond projects and be paid 6% of project costs. The directors were hesitant and wanted to reuse existing school plans, but architect E. C. Hemmings insisted the buildings be unique and that it would save on costs. In April 1920, the board appointed an Architectural and Engineering Commission consisting of architects Hemmings and Jens Peterson with structural engineer George Hudnutt, for a 4.5% commission. Hemmings was chairman of the commission and responsible for the plans and designs of the projects.

Although the original plans looked to abandon the original building, the District was able to acquire the remainder of the south half of the site's block for $33,000. That spring, the contract for Hemmings-Peterson-Hudnutt was transferred to newly formed Dean and Dean. The school architecture program carried on smoothly, as James S. Dean had been working on the Jefferson School design since the commission's inception.

Jefferson School became a distribution center for sugar rations during WWII. The building was converted to administrative offices in 1949, where it was used until 2009 when it was converted to storage. $270,000 was budgeted and plans included construction of a school supply warehouse. Charles Dean was architect, with Harry Devine as supervising architect. The original building had its interior almost completely gutted and renovated. Additionally, a two-story addition was built at the rear (north) of the building, along with a one-story east wing. The 1948–1949 school year was the last time students attended school at the site.

In 2022, plans were proposed to restore and turn the building into modern housing.

== See also ==
- Sacramento, California
