= Eisenhower Middle School =

Eisenhower Middle School may refer to:

- Eisenhower Middle School (San Antonio, Texas)
- Eisenhower Middle School (Topeka, Kansas)
- Eisenhower Middle School (Liberal, Kansas)
- Eisenhower Middle School (Wyckoff, New Jersey)
- Eisenhower Middle School (Succasunna, New Jersey)
- Eisenhower Middle School (Albuquerque, New Mexico)
- Eisenhower Middle School (Rockford, Illinois)
- Eisenhower Middle School (Freehold, New Jersey)
- Eisenhower Middle School (Everett, Washington)
- Eisenhower Middle School (Kansas City, Kansas)
- Eisenhower Middle School (Laurel, Maryland)
- Eisenhower Middle School (Gibsonton, Florida)
