= Melvin Sutton =

American cheerleader

- Born: circa 1994
- Education: Winston-Salem State University; University of the Arts
- Occupations: Cheerleader; Dancer
- Career
- Former groups: Carolina TopCats

Melvin Sutton is an American cheerleader. He was one of the first male members of the Carolina TopCats.

== Early life and education ==
Sutton grew up in Raleigh, North Carolina and attended Southeast Raleigh Magnet High School, where he was a member of the track & field team. He studied rehabilitation studies at Winston-Salem State University and was a member of the WSSU Rams Powerhouse of Red & White cheerleading squad. He earned a master of fine arts degree in dance from the University of the Arts in Philadelphia.

== Career ==
In 2021, Sutton became one of the first three male cheerleaders, alongside Chris Crawford and Tre' Booker, to make the Carolina TopCats, the NFL cheerleading squad for the Carolina Panthers.

== See also ==
- Justine Lindsay
