= Tre' Booker =

American dancer

- Education: University of North Carolina School of the Arts
- Occupations: Dancer; Cheerleader
- Career
- Former groups: Carolina Topcats

Javontre "Tre'" Booker is an American dancer. In 2021, he became one of the first three male members of the Carolina Topcats, the official NFL cheerleading squad for the Carolina Panthers.

== Early life ==
Booker's godmother is Emmy Award-winning director Joanne Hock. As a child, he was involved in acting and landed a role in the feature film Gospel Hill.

He trained at North Carolina Dance Theatre as a child and graduated from Northwest School of the Arts. He attended the University of North Carolina School of the Arts.

== Career ==
Booker worked as a main stage dancer for Disney Cruise Line.

In 2021, Booker became one of the first three male cheerleaders, alongside Chris Crawford and Melvin Sutton, to make the Carolina Topcats, the official NFL cheerleading squad for the Carolina Panthers.

In October 2025, Booker was cast in ensemble for the off-Broadway musical Bull Durham, a theatrical adaptation of the 1988 feature film.

== Personal life ==
Booker is gay. He is a Christian and describes himself as religious.
