= Jefferson School (Cape Girardeau, Missouri) =

- U.S. National Register of Historic Places
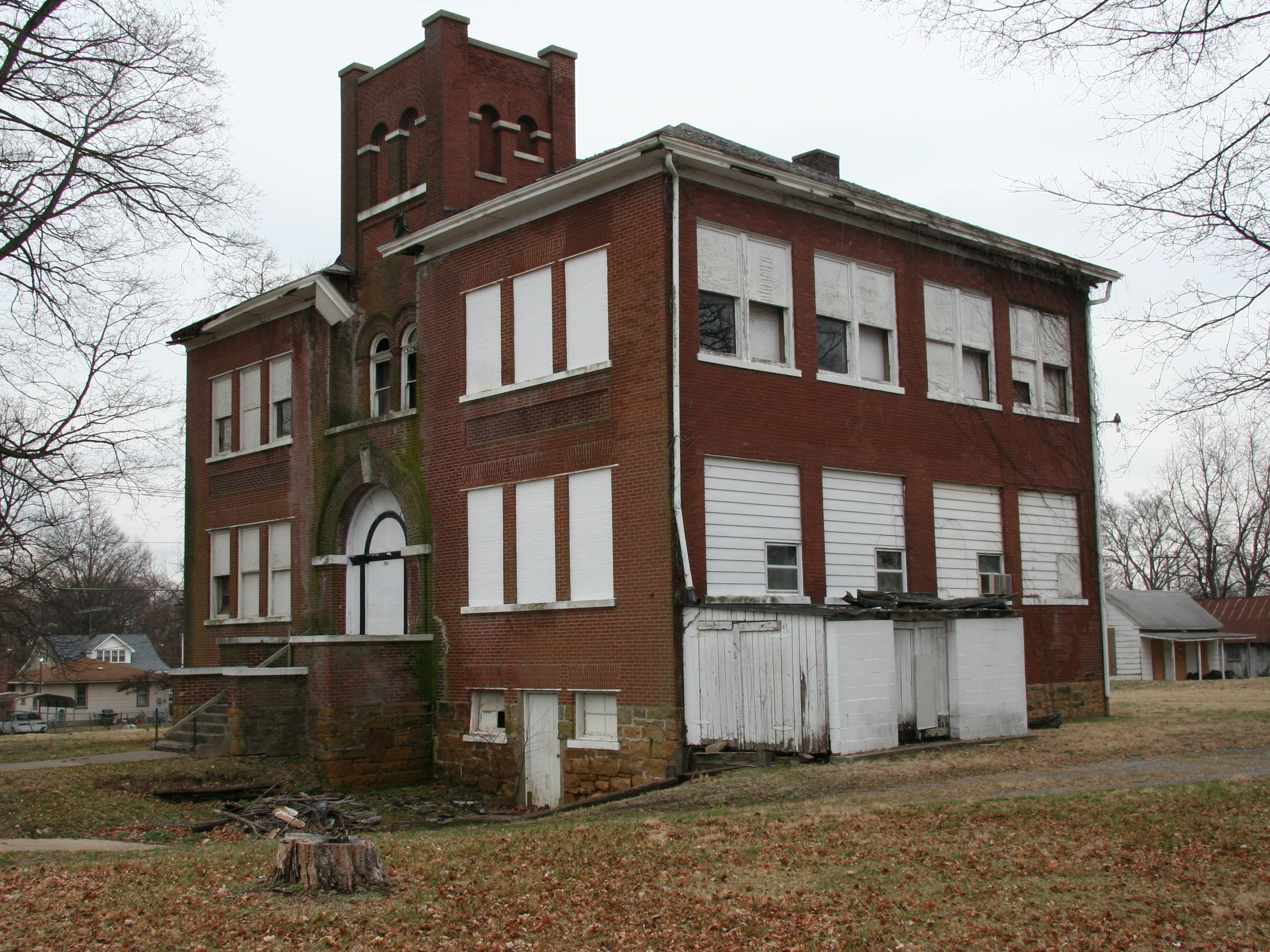
- Jefferson School, March 2011

- Location within Missouri Location within the United States
- Location: 731 Jefferson Ave., Cape Girardeau, Missouri
- Coordinates: 37.2968256°N 89.5292322°W
- Area: less than one acre
- Built: 1904
- Built by: Taylor, W.W. & Son
- Architect: Blackwood, Lewis B.
- Architectural style: Late 19th And 20th Century Revivals
- NRHP reference No.: 09000300
- Added to NRHP: May 12, 2009

Jefferson School was an elementary school building located at Cape Girardeau, Missouri. It was built in 1904, and is a two-story, red brick and stone elementary school building with a raised sandstone foundation and hipped roof. It featured a bell tower rising above the roofline. It operated as the city's elementary school for African-American students from 1953–1955, when it closed. It was demolished on December 28, 2012.

It was listed on the National Register of Historic Places in 2009.
