= James Monroe High School =

James Monroe High School may refer to:

- James Monroe High School (California), a high school located in Southern California acting as part of the Los Angeles Unified School District
- James Monroe High School (New York City), a defunct high school in The Bronx
- James Monroe High School (Rochester, New York) in Rochester, New York, part of the Rochester City School District
- James Monroe High School (Virginia) in Fredericksburg, Virginia
- James Monroe High School (West Virginia) in Lindside, West Virginia, the only public high school serving Monroe County, West Virginia
