= Art Institute of Charlotte =

Former for-profit art school as part of The Art Institutes

Coordinates: 35°11′1″N 80°55′35″W

The Art Institute of Charlotte
- Active: 1973–2018
- Location: Charlotte, North Carolina, United States
- Website: www.artinstitutes.edu/charlotte

The Art Institute of Charlotte was a for-profit art school in Charlotte, North Carolina. It was briefly operated as a non-profit institution before it closed in 2018. The school was one of a number of Art Institutes, a franchise of for-profit art colleges with many branches in North America, owned and operated by Education Management Corporation. EDMC owned the college from 1999 until 2017, when, facing significant financial problems and declining enrollment, the company sold the Art Institute of Charlotte, along with 30 other Art Institute schools, to Dream Center Education, a Los Angeles-based Pentecostal organization. Dream Center permanently closed 18 Art Institute schools, including the Art Institute of Charlotte, at the end of 2018.

== History ==
Founded in 1973 as the American Business & Fashion Institute, the college joined The Art Institutes system of schools in 1999 and changed its name to The Art Institute of Charlotte. The Art Institute of Charlotte was located at 2110 Water Ridge Parkway in Charlotte, North Carolina and is accredited by The Southern Association of Colleges and Schools Commission on Colleges (SACSCOC).

On December 28, 2018, the Art Institute of Charlotte closed.

== Media ==
Some of The Art Institute of Charlotte's students, alumni and professors have been interviewed or profiled in media outlets such as The Charlotte Observer, ⁣ The San Jose Mercury News, and NBC affiliate WCNC-TV.
