= Jefferson Elementary School (Pottstown, Pennsylvania) =

- U.S. National Register of Historic Places
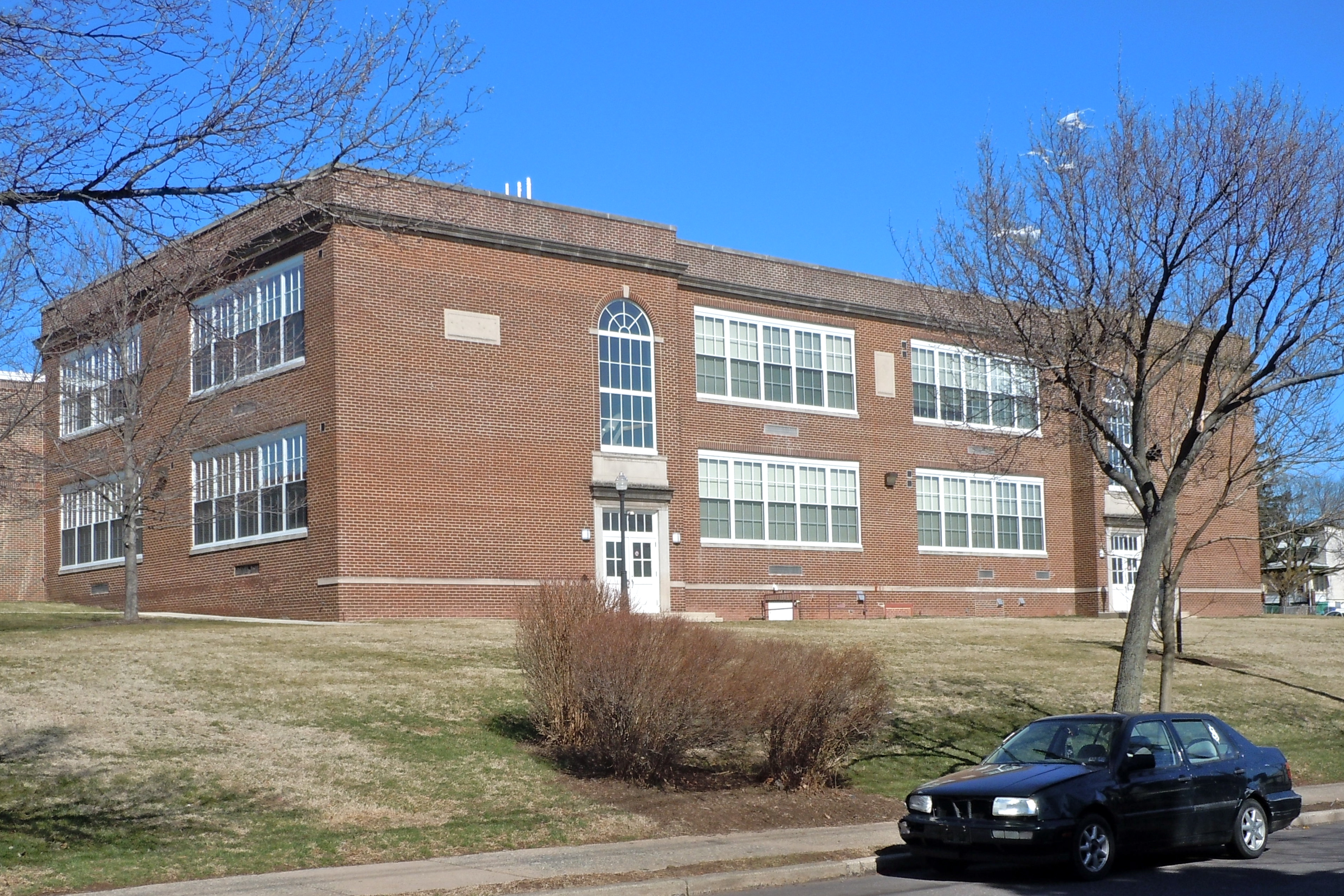
- Jefferson School, March 2011

- Location within Pennsylvania Location within the United States
- Location: Beech and Warren Sts., Pottstown, Pennsylvania
- Coordinates: 40°14′54″N 75°38′22″W
- Area: 3 acres (1.2 ha)
- Built: 1923, 1938-1939, 1957
- Architect: Ritter & Shay; Gondos and Gondos
- Architectural style: Classical Revival
- NRHP reference No.: 03000723
- Added to NRHP: September 30, 2003

The Jefferson Elementary School is an historic school building in Pottstown, Montgomery County, Pennsylvania, United States.

It was added to the National Register of Historic Places in 2003.

== History and architectural features ==
This historic structure is a large two-story, U-shaped, brick building that was designed in the Classical Revival style. The original section was built in 1923. The building was then expanded between 1938 and 1939 and again in 1957. It was decommissioned as a school in 1980.
