= Jefferson Elementary School (Creston, Iowa) =

Historic building in Iowa, United States

- U.S. National Register of Historic Places
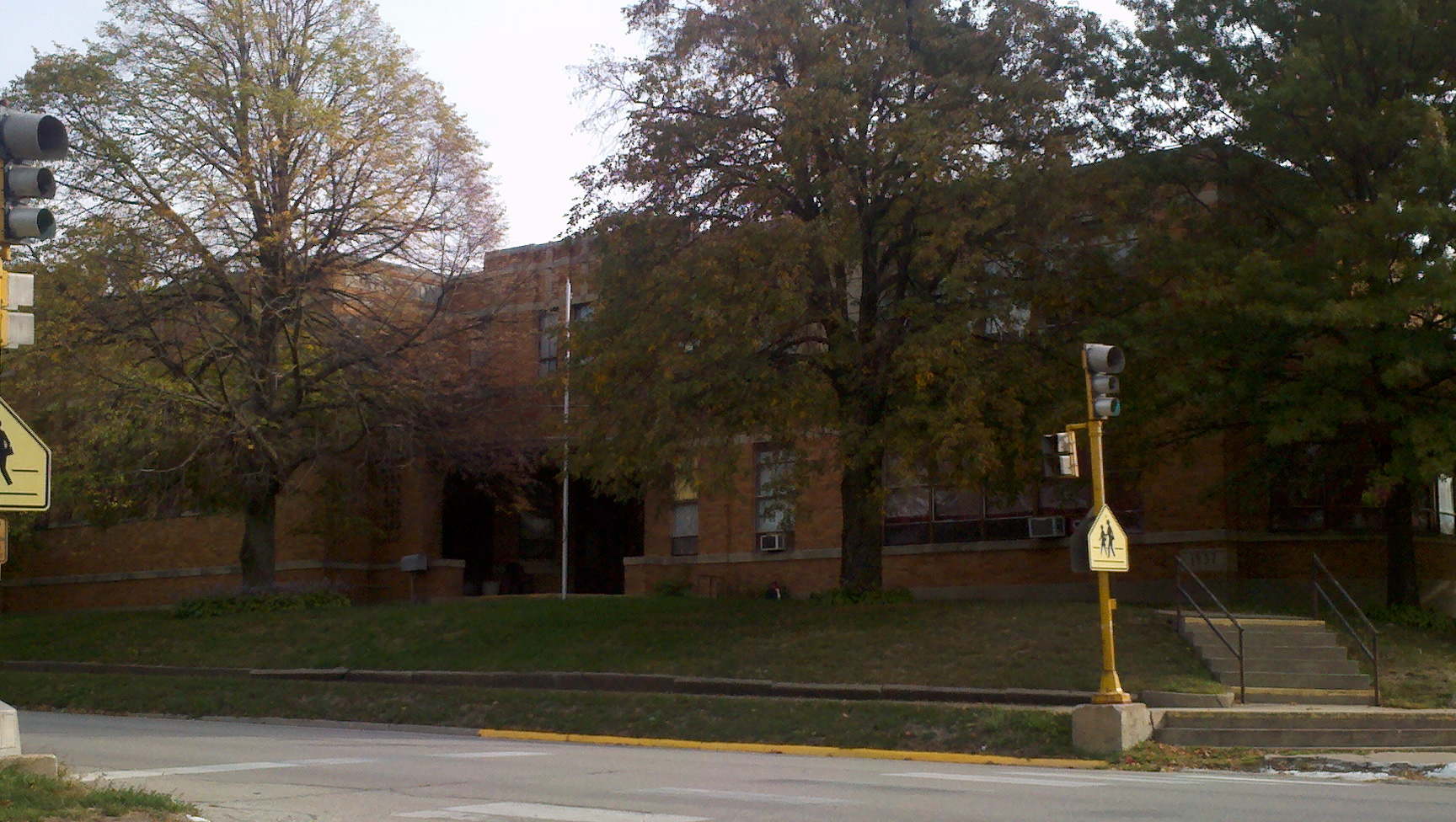

- Location within Iowa Location within the United States
- Location: 501 N. Cherry St. Creston, Iowa
- Coordinates: 41°03′45″N 94°21′23″W
- Area: less than one acre
- Built: 1937
- Built by: Hogeson Construction
- Architect: Dougher, Rich & Woodburn
- Architectural style: Moderne
- MPS: Public Schools for Iowa: Growth and Change MPS
- NRHP reference No.: 02001223
- Added to NRHP: October 24, 2002

The Jefferson Elementary School is a historic building located in Creston, Iowa, United States. There was an older Jefferson School building located on this property that was built in the 1880s. It had become overcrowded and lacked modern facilities by the 1920s. This building replaced it in 1937. It was built by Hogeson Construction for $74,629 using Public Works Administration funds. It was designed in the Moderne style by the Des Moines architectural firm of Dougher, Rich & Woodburn. The two-story brick structure was built on a concrete foundation, and it is capped with a flat roof. The multi-colored light brown brick is laid in a common bond, and it is accentuated with limestone beltcourses and copings. The building was listed on the National Register of Historic Places in 2002. The school closed in 2006.
