= Jefferson Elementary School (Winona, Minnesota) =

- Jefferson School
- U.S. National Register of Historic Places
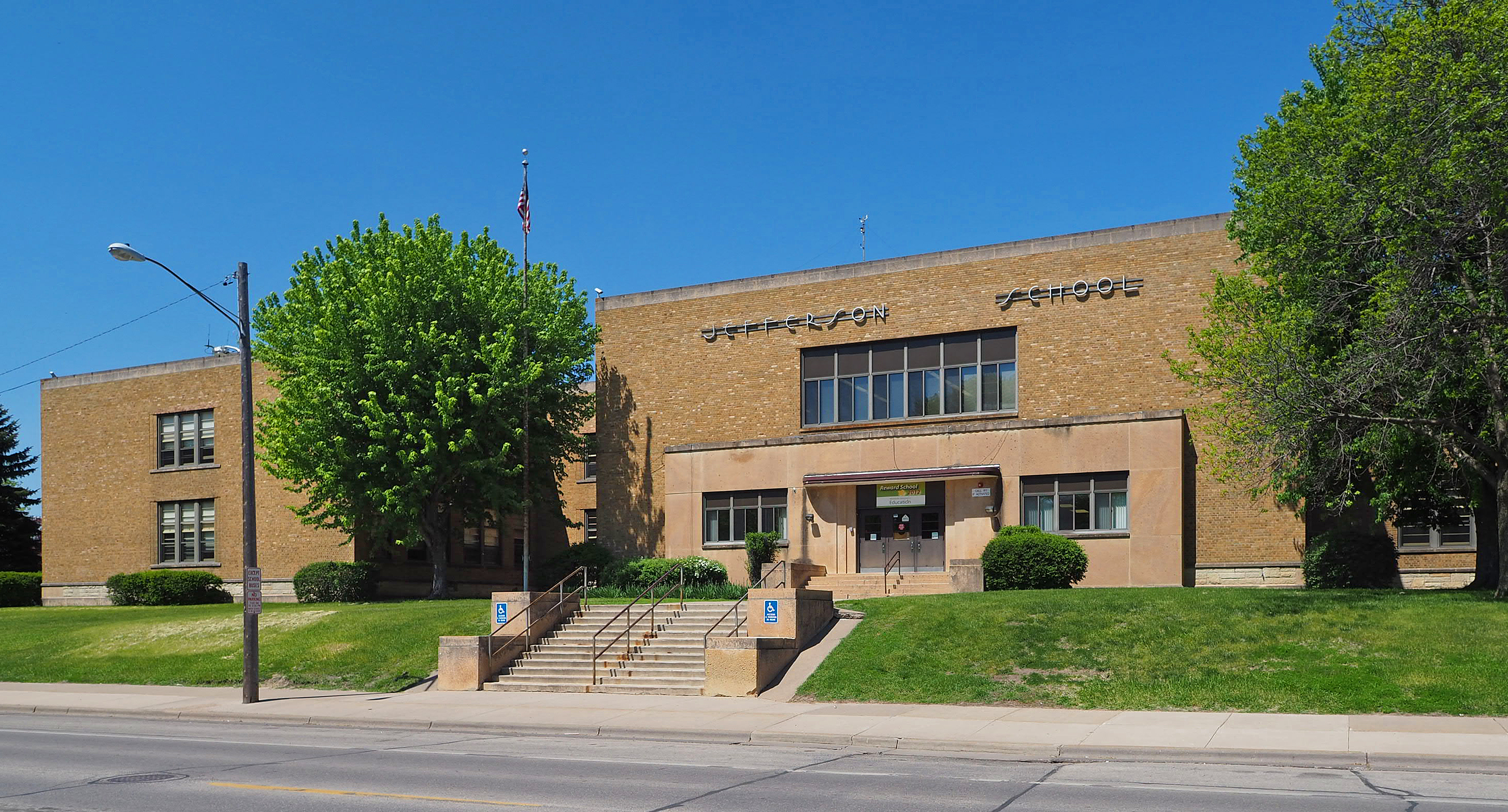
- Jefferson School viewed from the southeast

- Location within Minnesota Location within the United States
- Location: 1268 West 5th Street, Winona, Minnesota
- Coordinates: 44°3′16″N 91°40′16″W
- Area: 13.14 acres (5.32 ha)
- Built: 1937–1938
- Built by: H. B. Kilstofte
- Architect: Boyum, Schubert & Sorensen
- Architectural style: Art Moderne
- NRHP reference No.: 12000072
- Designated: March 6, 2012

Jefferson Elementary School is an elementary school in Winona, Minnesota, United States. Its building was completed in 1938, the last of five new facilities built by Winona Public Schools in the early 20th century. It was listed on the National Register of Historic Places in 2012 for its local significance in the themes of architecture and education. It was nominated for representing the efforts of Winona Public Schools to implement progressive educational reforms, as well as for its Public Works Administration funding and Art Moderne architecture.

== See also ==
- National Register of Historic Places listings in Winona County, Minnesota
