= James Madison High School =

James Madison High School is the name of the following high schools in the United States:

- James Madison High School (California), San Diego, California
- James Madison High School (Brooklyn), New York City
- James Madison High School (Dallas), Texas
- James Madison High School (San Antonio, Texas)
- James Madison High School (Fairfax County, Virginia)
- James Madison High School (Milwaukee), Wisconsin
- Vel Phillips Memorial High School, formerly known as James Madison Memorial High School, of Madison, Wisconsin
- James Madison High School online, operating from Georgia

== See also ==
- Madison High School (disambiguation)
