= Ronald W. Reagan High School =

American public school in North Carolina

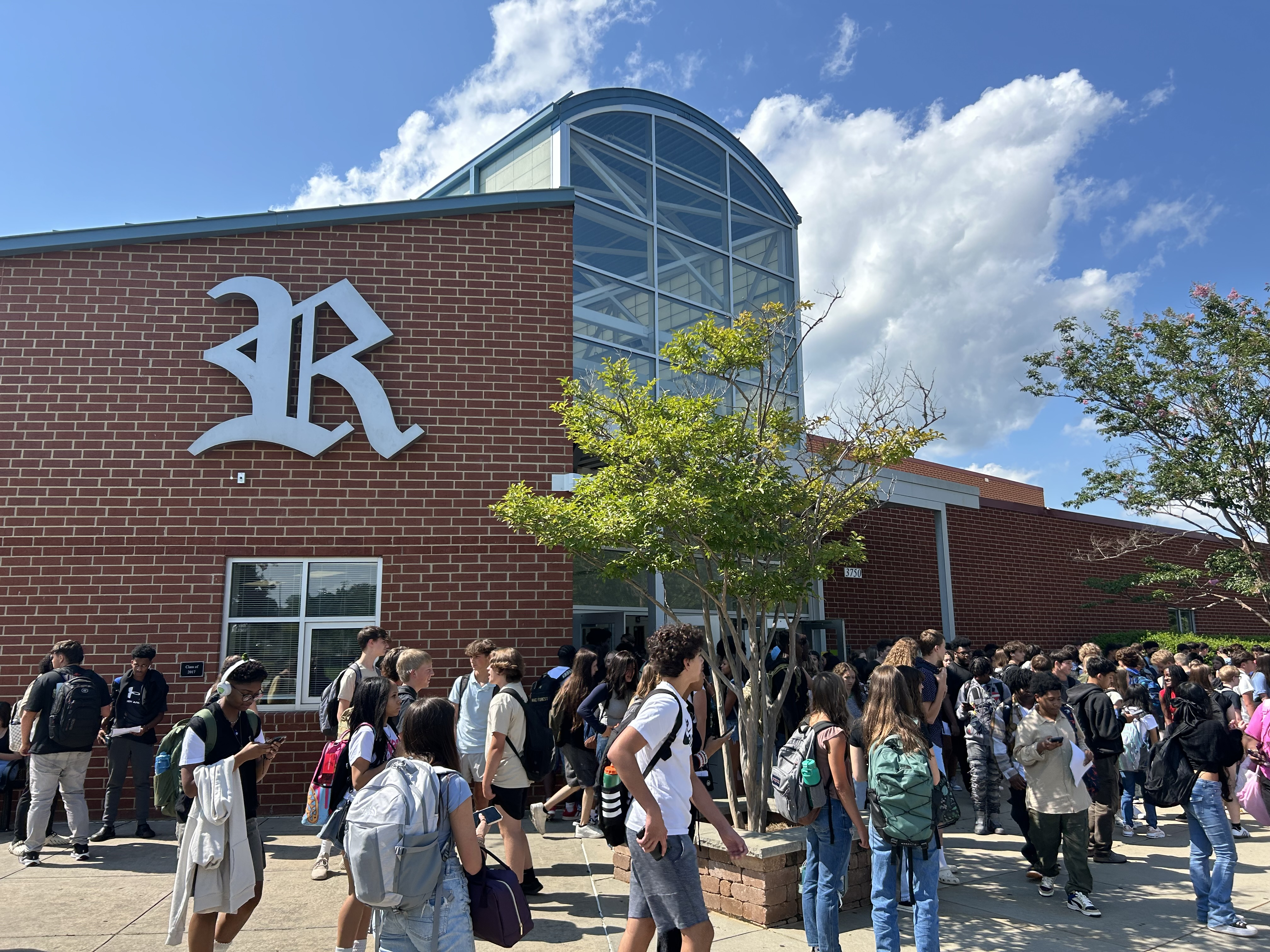
- Ronald W. Reagan High School, August 2024

Location
- 3750 Transou Road; Pfafftown, North Carolina 27040; United States; 36°10′13″N 80°21′54″W

Information
- School type: Public
- Motto: "No Raider Rides Alone!"
- Founded: 2005 (21 years ago)
- School district: Winston-Salem/Forsyth County Schools
- Superintendent: Don Phipps
- CEEB code: 343134
- Principal: Brent Atkinson
- Staff: 110.10 (FTE)
- Grades: 9–12
- Enrollment: 2,227 (2023-2024)
- Student to teacher ratio: 20.23
- Language: English
- Colors: Black, Silver, and Teal
- Athletics: NCHSAA 7A
- Athletics conference: Central Piedmont 7A/8A
- Mascot: Raiders
- Newspaper: The Rooster
- Yearbook: Nexus
- Website: wsfcs.k12.nc.us/rhs

Ronald W. Reagan High School (also known as Reagan High School) is a public high school in Pfafftown, North Carolina, United States, under the direction of the Winston-Salem/Forsyth County Schools system. Brent Atkinson is the current principal.

== Naming ==
The school is named after Ronald Wilson Reagan (1911–2004), the 40th president of the United States.

== History ==
Ronald W. Reagan High School was constructed to begin operation at the beginning of the 2005–2006 school year. The Class of 2007 was the first to graduate from Ronald W. Reagan High School.

== Athletics ==
Reagan is a North Carolina High School Athletic Association (NCHSAA) 7A school, that competes in the Central Piedmont 7A/8A Conference. The school fields the following athletic teams: baseball, basketball, cheerleading, cross country, field hockey, football, golf, indoor track, lacrosse, soccer, softball, swimming, tennis, track and field, volleyball, and wrestling.

In 2014, the boy's soccer team won the first NCHSAA state championship in Reagan's school history, with a 1–0 win over Broughton High School in the NCHSAA 4A state championship game.

=== State Championships ===
Ronald W. Reagan has won the following NCHSAA team state championships:

- Men's Soccer: 2014 (4A)
- Women's Golf: 2018 (4A), 2020 (4A), 2021 (4A)

== Notable alumni ==
- Craig Engels, American middle-distance runner
- Josh Hartle, professional baseball player for the Lake County Captains
- Chandalae Lanouette, NFL cheerleader, entertainment manager for the Carolina Panthers
- Shavon Revel, NFL cornerback for the Dallas Cowboys
